= André-Charles Boulle =

French cabinetmaker (1642–1732)

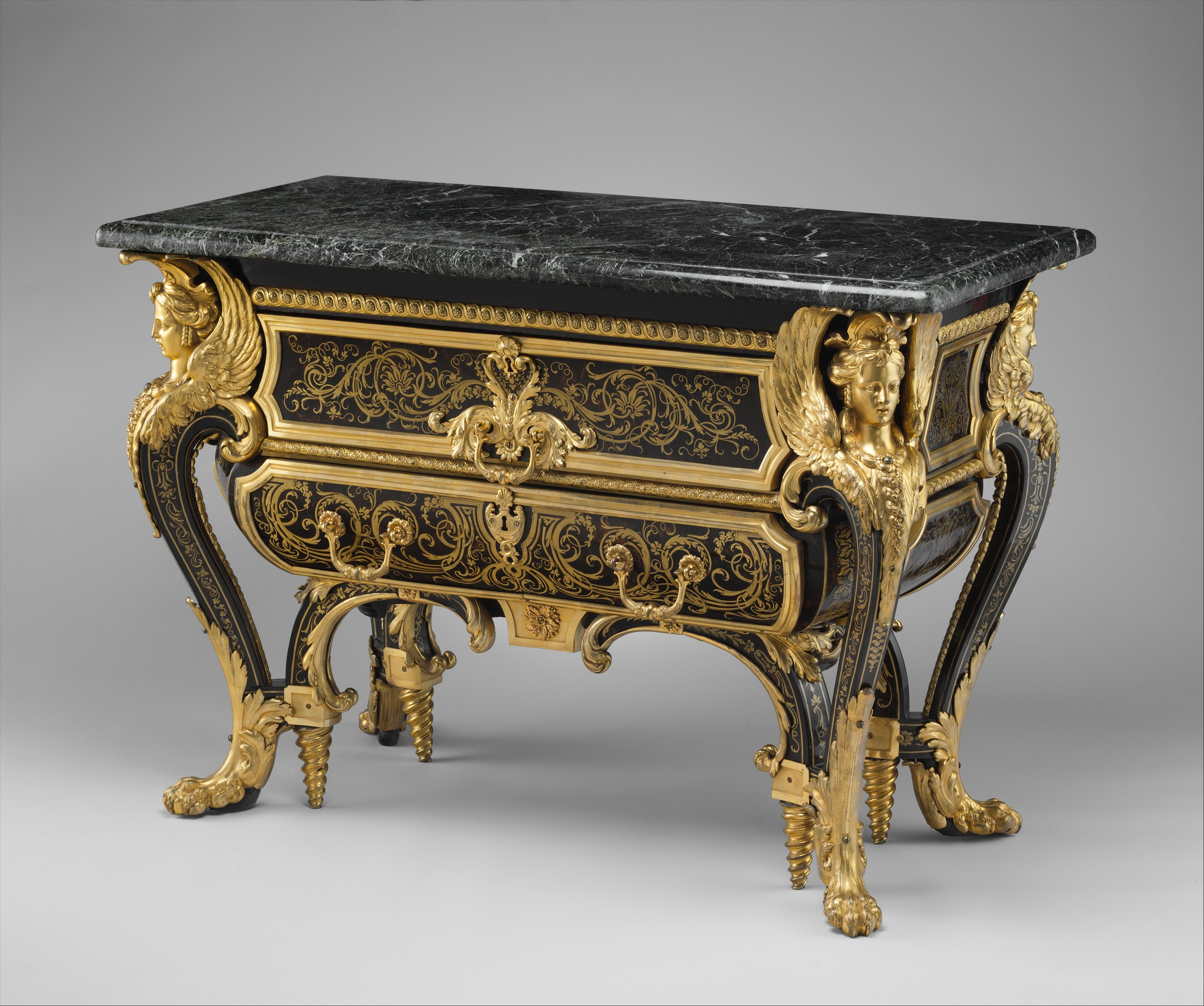
Commode by André-Charles Boulle, son of Jean Boulle: (c. 1710–20). Walnut veneered with ebony, marquetry of engraved brass and tortoiseshell, gilt-bronze mounts, verd antique marble

André-Charles Boulle (French pronunciation: [ɑ̃dʁe ʃaʁl bul]; 11 November 1642 – 29 February 1732), le joailler du meuble (the "furniture jeweller"), became the most famous French cabinetmaker and the preeminent artist in the field of marquetry, also known as "inlay". Boulle was "the most remarkable of all French cabinetmakers". Jean-Baptiste Colbert (29 August 1619 – 6 September 1683) recommended him to Louis XIV, the "Sun King" (r. 1643–1715), as "the most skilled craftsman in his profession". Over the centuries since his death, his name and that of his family has become associated with the art he perfected, the inlay of tortoiseshell, brass and pewter into ebony. It has become known as Boulle work, and the École Boulle (founded in 1886), a college of fine arts and crafts and applied arts in Paris, continues today to bear testimony to his enduring art, the art of inlay.

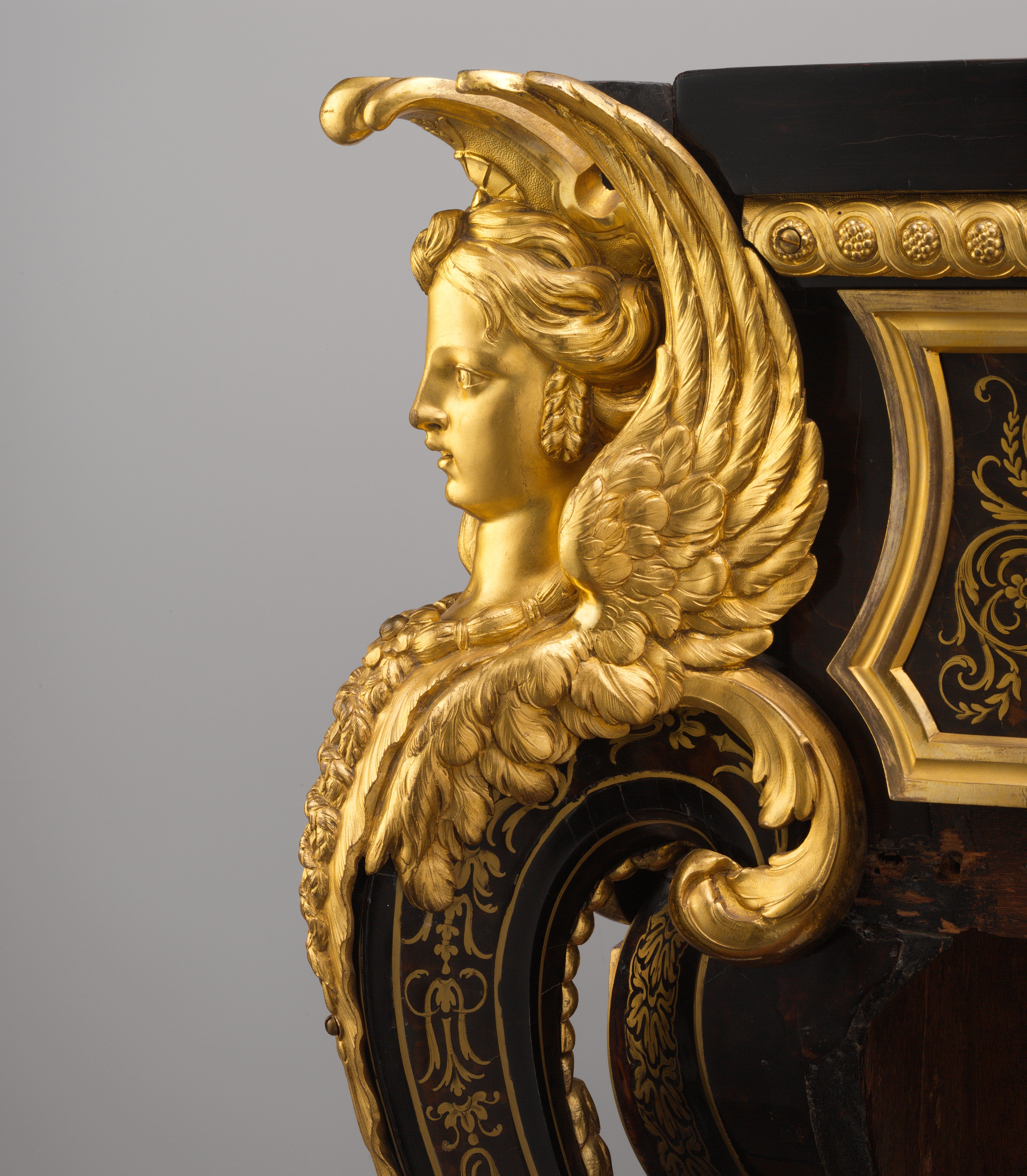
Commode by André-Charles Boulle - Detail

== Life ==
In the year of 1677, on his marriage certificate, André-Charles Boulle gave his birth date, for posterity, as being 11 November 1642. No other document corroborates this birth in Paris. The historians M. Charles Read, H.-L. Lacordaire and Paulin Richard have determined that his father was the Protestant Jan (or Jean/Johann) Bolt (or Bolte/Boul/ Bolle) but at his own (Catholic) marriage, André-Charles Boulle named his father as "Jean Boulle". André-Charles Boulle's marriage at Saint Sulpice and burial in 1732 at Saint-Germain-l'Auxerrois are but two of many lifetime inconsistencies with his Protestant 'provenance', most easily explained by the ongoing persecution of Protestants. His parentage with the Protestant Boulles from Marseille, Louis XIV's Historian needs clarification and Coliès, in his Bibliothèque Choisies confirms a Marseillais relative as being the author of a History of Protestantism, called Essay de l'histoire des Protestants Distingués Par Nation (1646).

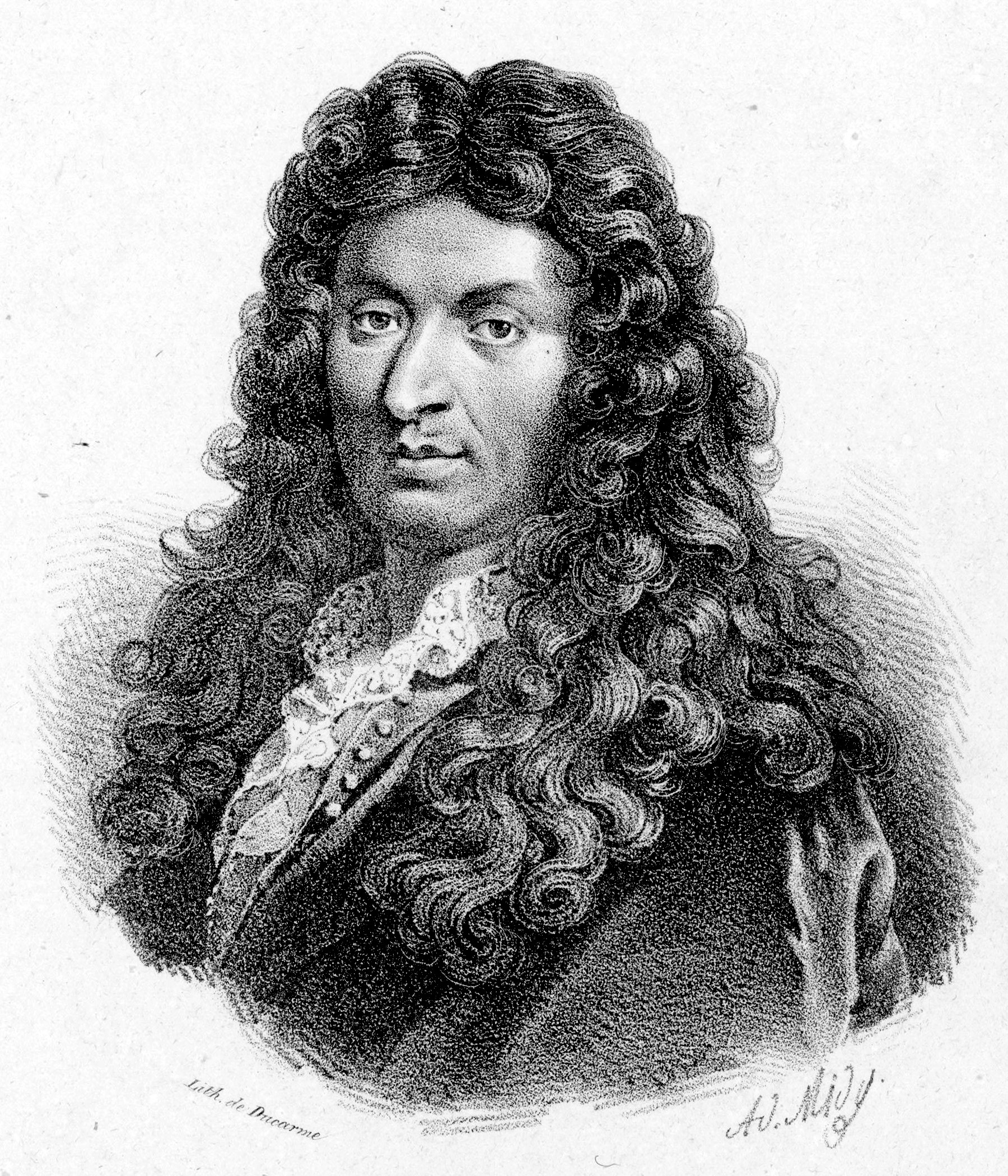
Jean-Baptiste Lully c. 1670

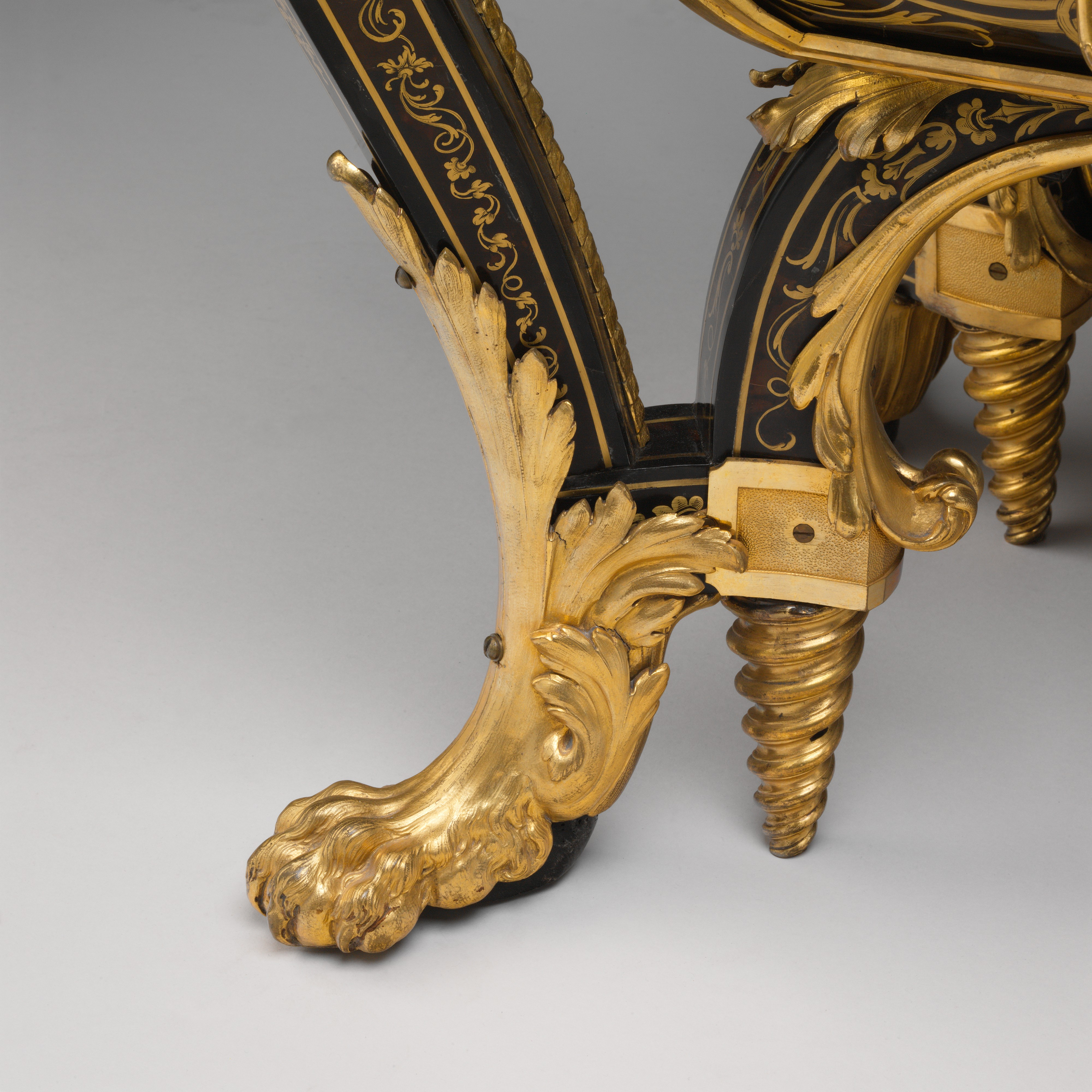
Commode by André-Charles Boulle, son of Jean Boulle - Detail

In the absence of a birth document, three factors play a critical part in the mystery surrounding Boulle's parentage.

The first is that foreign artists flocking to the Sun King's Court were keen to be naturalised French subjects to 'fit in' and would, like Jean-Baptiste Lully the Royal Musician (28 November 1632 – 22 March 1687), have changed their names. For Lully, it was from "Giovanni Battista Lulli" to "Jean-Baptiste Lully") but at his marriage, he falsely declared his father's name to be Laurent de Lully, gentilhomme Florentin [Florentine gentleman]". This historical background makes it difficult for the historian to identify which of the many Jean Boulles, Jean Bolles, Johann Bolts or even 'Jean Boulds' on record was André-Charles Boulle's true father. Some of these are of Catholic French origin, some are French Protestants and some are from Gelderland in Holland.

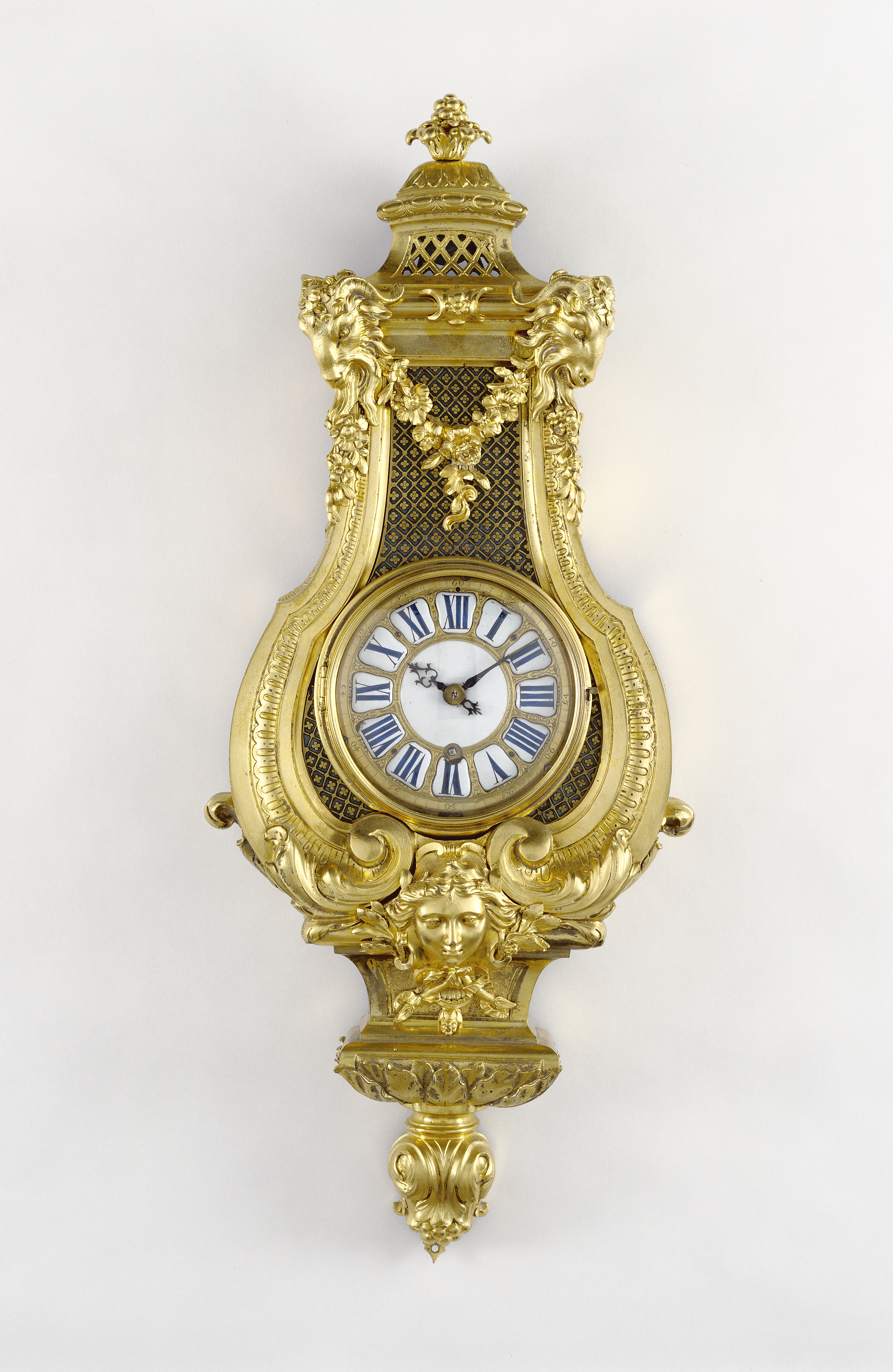
J. Paul Getty Museum: Wall Clock; Attributed to André-Charles Boulle (French, 1642–1732, master before 1666); Paris, France; about 1710; Gilt bronze; blue-painted horn; enameled metal.

The second factor is that André-Charles Boulle's birth date is almost certainly inaccurate. Despite his genius (or perhaps because of it) André-Charles Boulle was a demonstrably poor administrator and poor with dates and specifically in respect of his age. His children were no different, declaring him to be 90 years old when he died. This is highly unlikely.

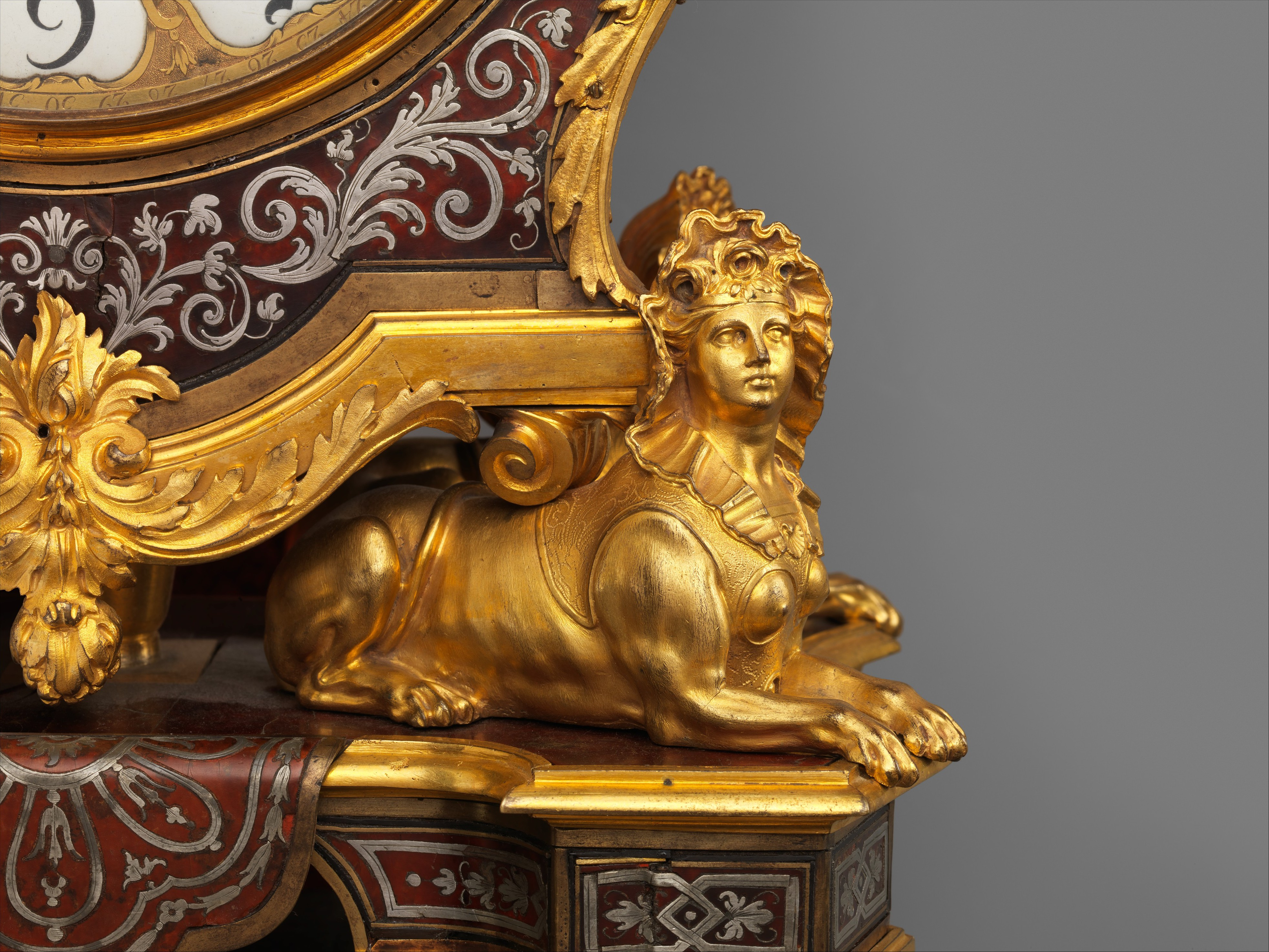
Clock with pedestal by André-Charles Boulle - Detail

The third and perhaps most telling factor adding to the overall confusion about Boulle's parentage was that in October 1685 (a mere 8 years after his marriage), Louis XIV renounced the Edict of Nantes and declared Protestantism illegal with the Edict of Fontainebleau. All Protestant ministers were given two weeks to leave the country unless they converted to Catholicism. Louis XIV ordered the destruction of Huguenot churches, as well as the closure of Protestant schools. This made official the persecution of Protestants already enforced since 1681 and it led to around 400,000 fleeing the country.

Jean-Baptiste Lully demonstrates, by his documented actions, that marriage was a propitious time to tidy up provenance. Within the context of the times, it is natural to expect that as well as ensuring his father's Catholic name was recorded for posterity, André-Charles Boulle 'tidied' up his own place and date of birth. This made him older, for motives we do not yet comprehend. There is also the definite possibility, as yet unexplored by historians, that André-Charles Boulle was born in Holland. It would explain a lot of the confusion around his parentage. The salient fact is that we only have André-Charles Boulle's word that he was born in Paris in 1642.

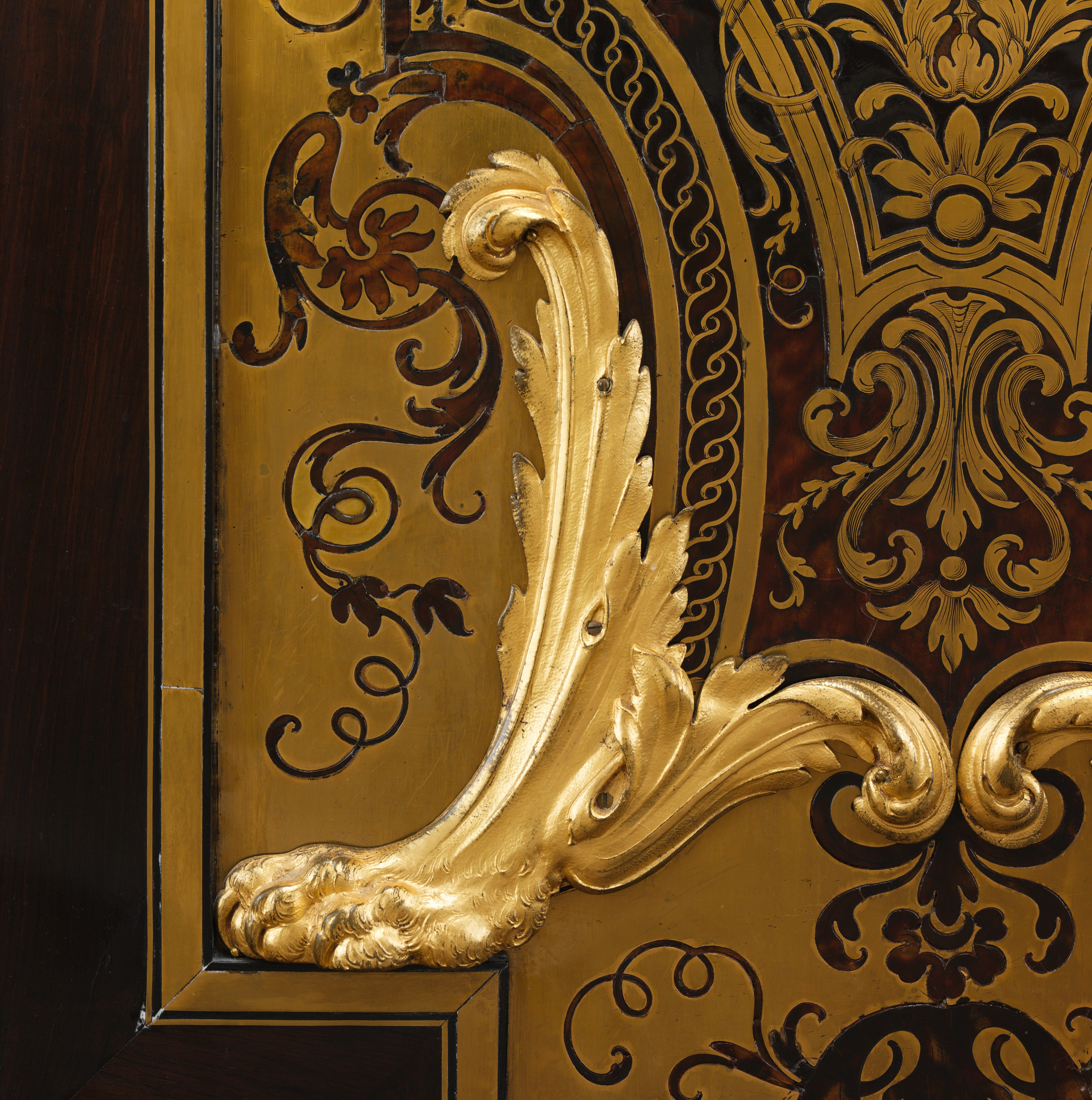
Cabinet - Oak veneered with Macassar and Gabon ebony, ebonized fruitwood, burl wood, and marquetry of tortoiseshell and brass; gilt bronze

André-Charles Boulle's Protestant family environment was a rich and artistic milieu totally consistent with the genius of the Art he was to produce in later years. His father, Jean Boulle (ca 1616-?), was cabinetmaker to the King, had been naturalised French in 1676 and lived in the Louvre Palace, by royal decree. His grandfather, Pierre Boulle (ca 1595–1649), was naturalised French in 1675, had been cabinetmaker to Louis XIII and had also lived in the Louvre. André-Charles was thus exposed to two generations of illustrious artists, master craftsmen, engravers, cabinetmakers and, indeed, family all directly contracted by the King. As pointed out by the historians M. De Montaiglon and Charles Asselineau, this entourage included his aunt Marguerite Bahuche (on his mother's side) who was a famous painter in her own right, married to another very famous artist, Jacob Bunel, Henry IV's favourite painter. Others who were appointed by the King and worked with the two preceding generations of Boulles from their ateliers in the Louvre included the painter Louis Du Guernier (1614–1659), the embroiderers Nicolas Boulle and Caillard and the goldsmith Pierre de la Barre.

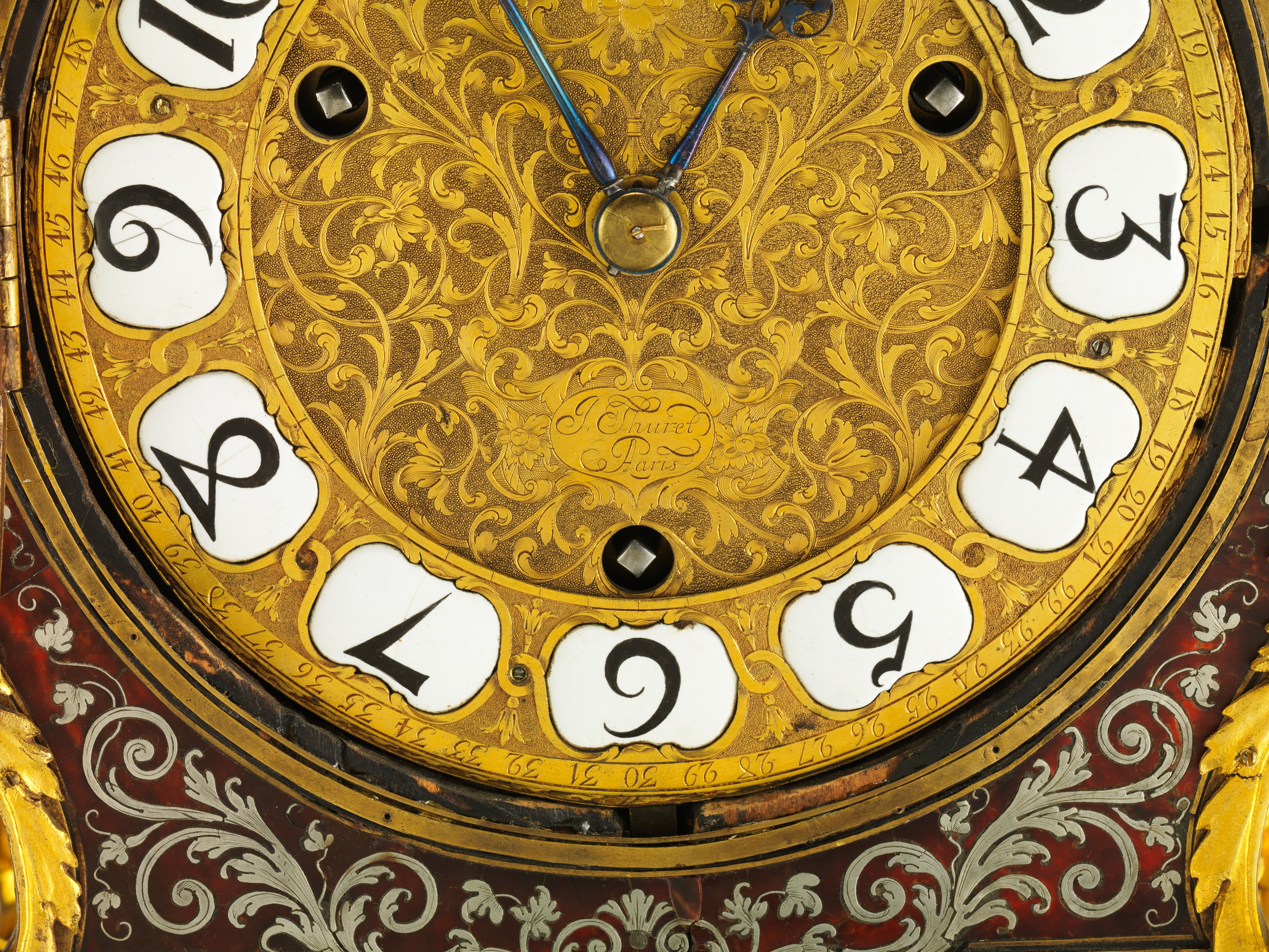
Boulle work on Boulle Clock - Detail

There is virtually nothing on André-Charles Boulle's youth, upbringing or training apart from a solitary Notarial Act dated 19 July 1666 (when he was supposedly 24 years old) agreeing a 5-year apprentice's contract for a 17-year-old nephew, François Delaleau, Master Carpenter from L'Abbaye des Celestins de Marcoussis in Paris. André-Charles Boulle's own apprenticeship was therefore most likely to have occurred within the focused confines of his father's atelier at the Louvre. Here, in any event, he was closest to the Sun King and to Jean-Baptiste Colbert who discovered him.

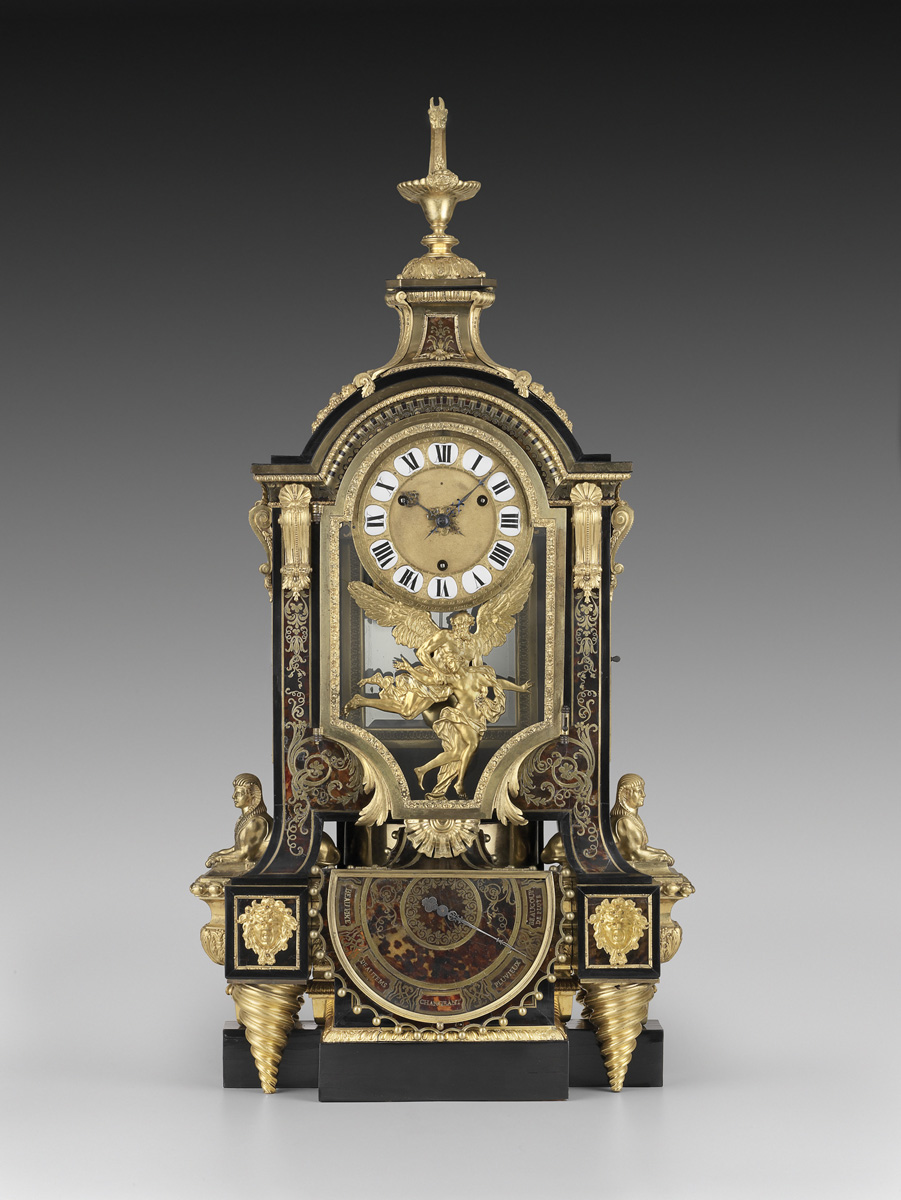
Barometer Clock, Andre-Charles Boulle, Casemaker (Attributed to) Ebony, Tortoiseshell, and Brass Barometer Mantel Clock, 1690 ebony, tortoiseshell, and brass on walnut and oak 42 1/4 in. × 23 1/8 in. x 10 1/4 in. (107.32 cm x 58.67 cm x 26.04 cm) Frick Collection

In 1672, by the age of 30, Boulle had already been granted lodgings in the galleries of the Louvre which Louis XIV had set apart for the use of the most favoured among the artists employed by the Crown. To be admitted to these galleries signified a mark of special royal favour and also freed him from the restrictions imposed by the trade guilds. Boulle received the deceased Jean Macé's lodgings on the recommendation of the Minister of Arts, Jean-Baptiste Colbert, who described Boulle as le plus habile ébéniste de Paris. The royal decree conferring this privilege describes Boulle variously as a chaser, gilder and maker of marquetry. Boulle received the post of Premier ébéniste du Roi.

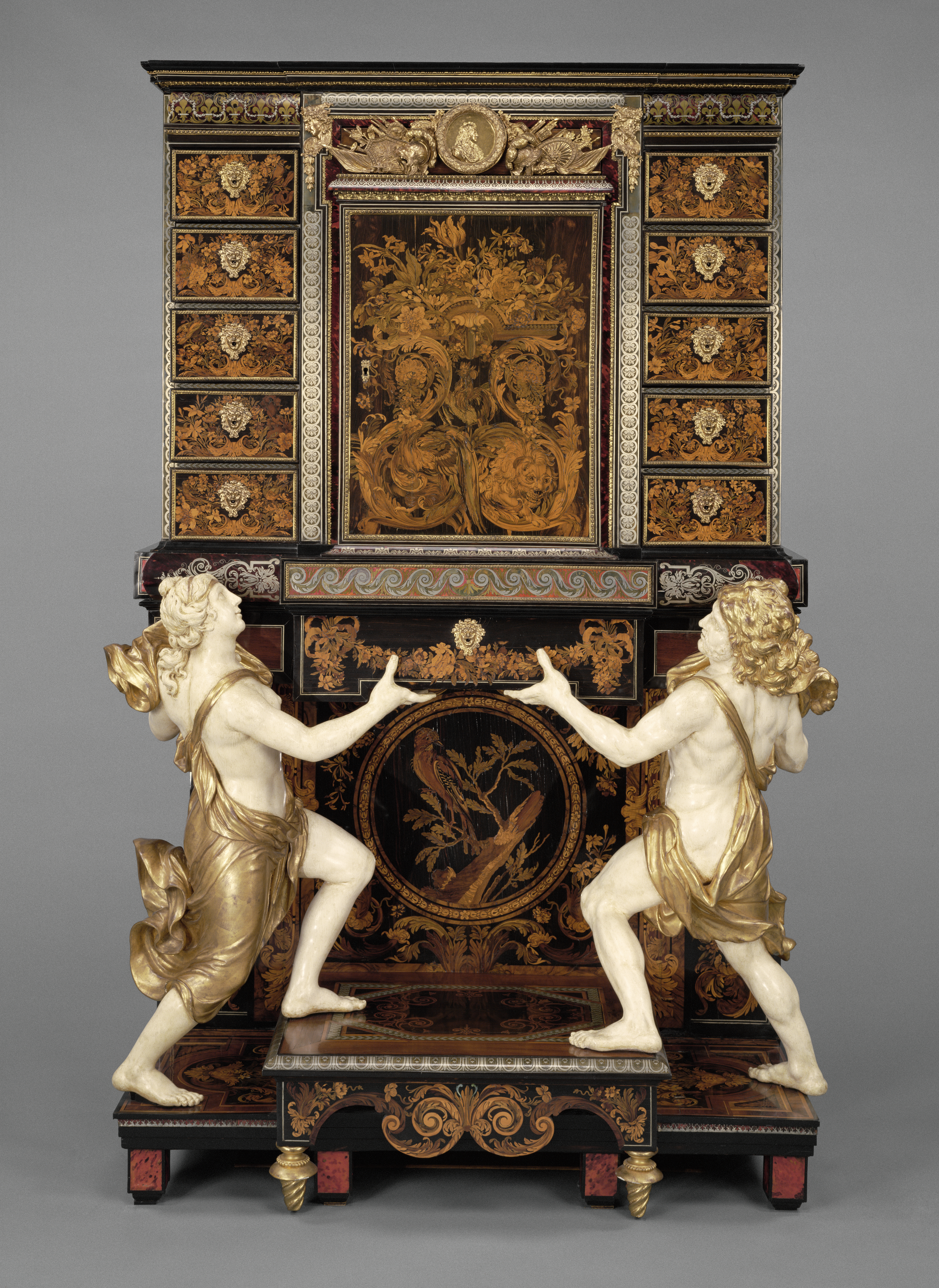
The J. Paul Getty Museum. Cabinet on Stand; Attributed to André-Charles Boulle (French, 1642–1732, master before 1666), and medallions after Jean Varin (French, 1596–1672); Paris, France; about 1675–1680; Oak veneered with pewter, brass, tortoise shell, horn, ebony, ivory, and wood marquetry; bronze mounts; figures of painted and gilded oak; with drawers of snakewood

Boulle initially had aspirations to be a painter but according to one of his close friends, Pierre-Jean Mariette (7 May 1694 – 10 September 1774), he was forced by his cabinetmaker father, Jean Boulle, to develop other skills. This may explain a sense of 'missed vocation' and resultant 'passion' and utter dedication to the collection of prints and paintings, which nearly ruined him…

The first payment on record to him by the crown (1669) specifies ouvrages de peinture and Boulle was employed for years on end at the Palace of Versailles, where the mirrored walls, floors of wood mosaic, inlaid paneling and marquetry in the Apartment of the Dauphin (1682–1686) came to be regarded by such as Jean-Aimar Piganiol de La Force ( 21 September 1669 – 10 January 1753 ) as his most remarkable work. The rooms were dismantled in the late 18th century and their unfashionable art broken up. More recently, a partial inventory of the Grand Dauphin's decorations at the Palace of Versailles has come to light at the National Archives in Paris.

Boulle carried out numerous royal commissions for the "Sun King", as can be seen from the records of the Bâtiments du Roi and correspondence of the marquis de Louvois. Foreign princes, French nobility, government ministers and French financiers flocked to him offering him work, and the famous words of the abbé de Marolles, Boulle y tourne en ovale became a well established saying in the literature associated with French cabinetmaking. Professor C.R. Williams writes, "There was no limit to the prices a reckless and profligate court was willing to pay for luxurious beauty during the sumptuous, extravagant reign of Louis the Magnificent of France. For much that was most splendid and beautiful in furniture making at this period stands the name of Charles André Boulle. His imagination and skill were given full play, and he proved equal to the demands made upon him.Boulle was a remarkable man. In a court whose only thought was of pleasure and display, he realized that his furniture must not only excel all others in richness, beauty, and cost; it must also be both comfortable and useful. He was appointed cabinet maker to the Dauphin, the heir to the throne of France. This distinction, together with his own tastes, led him to copy some of the manners and bearing of his rich customers. He was an aristocrat among furniture makers. He spent the greater part of his large fortune in filling his workshop with works of art. His warehouses were packed with precious woods and finished and unfinished pieces of magnificent furniture. In his own rooms were priceless works of art, the collection of a lifetime—gems, medals, drawings, and paintings, which included forty-eight drawings by Raphael."

Boulle's output from, at one time, three workshops included commodes, bureaux, armoires, pedestals, clockcases and lighting-fixtures, richly mounted with gilt-bronze that he modelled himself. Despite his skills, his exquisite craftsmen and the high prices he commanded, Boulle was always running out of money. This was mostly as a direct result of his lifelong obsession as a collector and hoarder of works of art. Although he undoubtedly drew inspiration for his own works from these purchases, it meant he did not always pay his workmen regularly. In addition, clients who had made considerable advances failed to obtain the pieces they had ordered and, on more than one occasion. These dissatisfied clients made formal attempts to get royal permission to arrest him for his debts, despite the royal protection afforded by his post at the Louvre. In 1704, the King granted him six months' protection from his creditors on condition that Boulle use the time to regulate his affairs or this would be the last grace that Louis would do him. Living beyond his means seems to have been a family trait as history repeated itself, twenty years later, when one of his sons was arrested at Fontainebleau and actually imprisoned until King Louis XV had him released.

In 1720, Boulle's shaky finances were dealt a further blow by a fire which began in an adjoining atelier and spread to his workshop in the Place du Louvre (one of three he maintained), completely destroying twenty workbenches and the various tools of eighteen ébénistes, two menuisiers as well as most of the precious seasoned wood, appliances, models, and finished works of art. What could be salvaged was sold and a petition for financial assistance made to the Regent, the success of this appeal is unknown. According to Boulle's friend, Pierre-Jean Mariette, many of his pecuniary problems were indeed as a direct result of his obsession for collecting and hoarding pictures, engravings, and other art objects. The inventory of his losses in this fire exceeded 40,000 livres, included many old Masters, not to mention 48 drawings by Raphael, wax models by Michelangelo and the manuscript journal kept by Rubens in Italy.

The compulsive Boulle attended literally every sale of drawings and engravings he could. He borrowed at high interest rates to pay for his purchases until the next auction when he devised other means to gain more cash. His friend Pierre-Jean Mariette informs that it was a compulsion that was impossible to cure. André-Charles Boulle died on 29 February 1732 in the Louvre, leaving many debts for his four sons to deal with and, to whom he had transferred ownership of his business and tenure in the Louvre some seventeen years earlier.

== Family ==
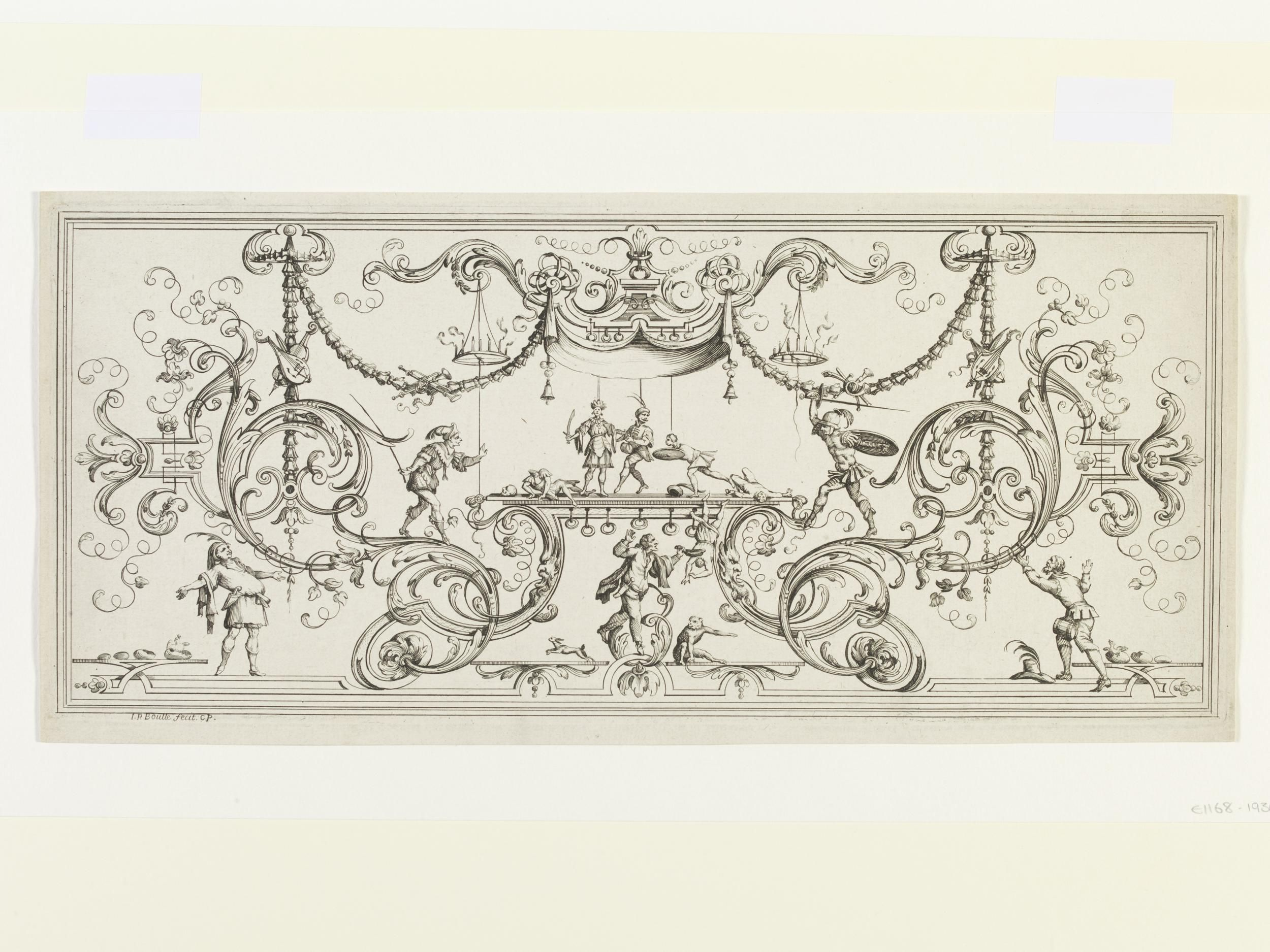
Design for a marquetry panel by Jean-Philippe Boulle, the Oldest Son of André-Charles Boulle.

Boulle left four sons: Jean-Philippe (1678–1744), Pierre-Benoît (c.1683-1741), André-Charles II (1685–1749) and Charles-Joseph (1688–1754). They were handed over the contents and technology of his workshops as early as 1715. Despite all four sons being granted the very prestigious royal title ébéniste du roi, their financial affairs were as badly managed as those of their father's. Three of the four brothers are known to have died in debt.

== Boulle work ==
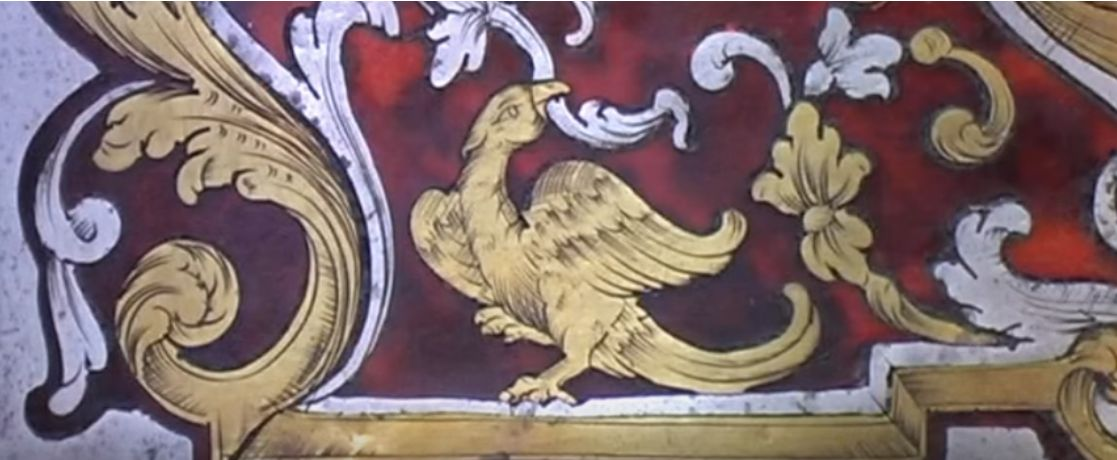
Example of Boulle work with tortoiseshell in mottled red, brass and pewter

Boulle's inlay materials included tortoiseshell, brass, pewter and even animal horn. For contrasting woods, he often used rosewood, ebony, kingwood, and other dense, dark-toned tropical species. Boulle's marquetry technique was to make two contrasting sheets of intricate inlay that were cut from a single sandwich of materials. If the sandwich, or packet, contained two layers that were light and dark, the two final products would be a sheet with a light pattern on a dark background, and a reversed sheet, with a dark pattern on a light background. One sheet would have been considered the primary pattern, in French the 'première partie'. The opposite pattern was called the counterpart, or 'contrapartie'. By sawing both patterns out of one packet and reassembling them on two trays, the background of the 'première partie' becomes the motif of the 'contrapartie'. Boulle made cabinets with both patterns in a single piece, or pairs of contrasting cabinets.

=== Tortoiseshell ===
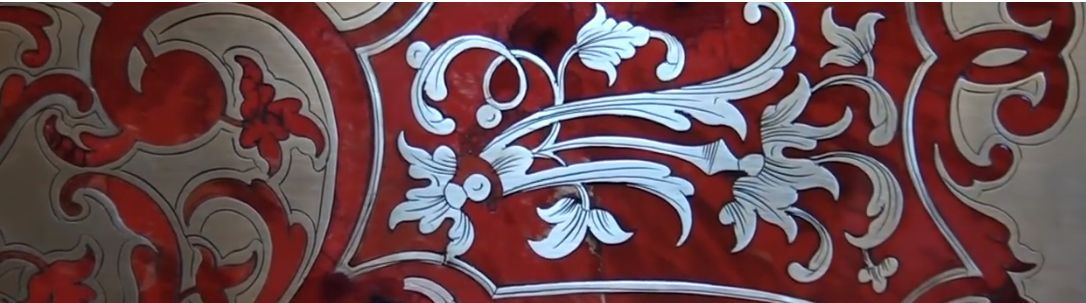
Boulle work showing the use of pewter (center) and the 'depth' given by tortoiseshell in the background. Brass Inlay is on the right and left.

Tortoiseshell was used in thin sliced inlays onto wood and is today an important reference with regard to Boulle work. Despite tortoiseshell's rarity and cost, its durability, organic warmth and mottled-red aesthetics made it particularly apt for exotic wood such as ebony. This is because it gives a sense of depth to Boulle work. The initial processing of tortoiseshell involves separating the layers of the scutes from the animal's carapace by heating, and softening the plates by boiling them, in salt water, and thereafter flattening them under a press. Although two pieces could be fused together by use of a hot iron, great care had to be taken not to lose the colour. Finishing and polishing was done by various techniques.

=== Brass (Gilt bronze) ===
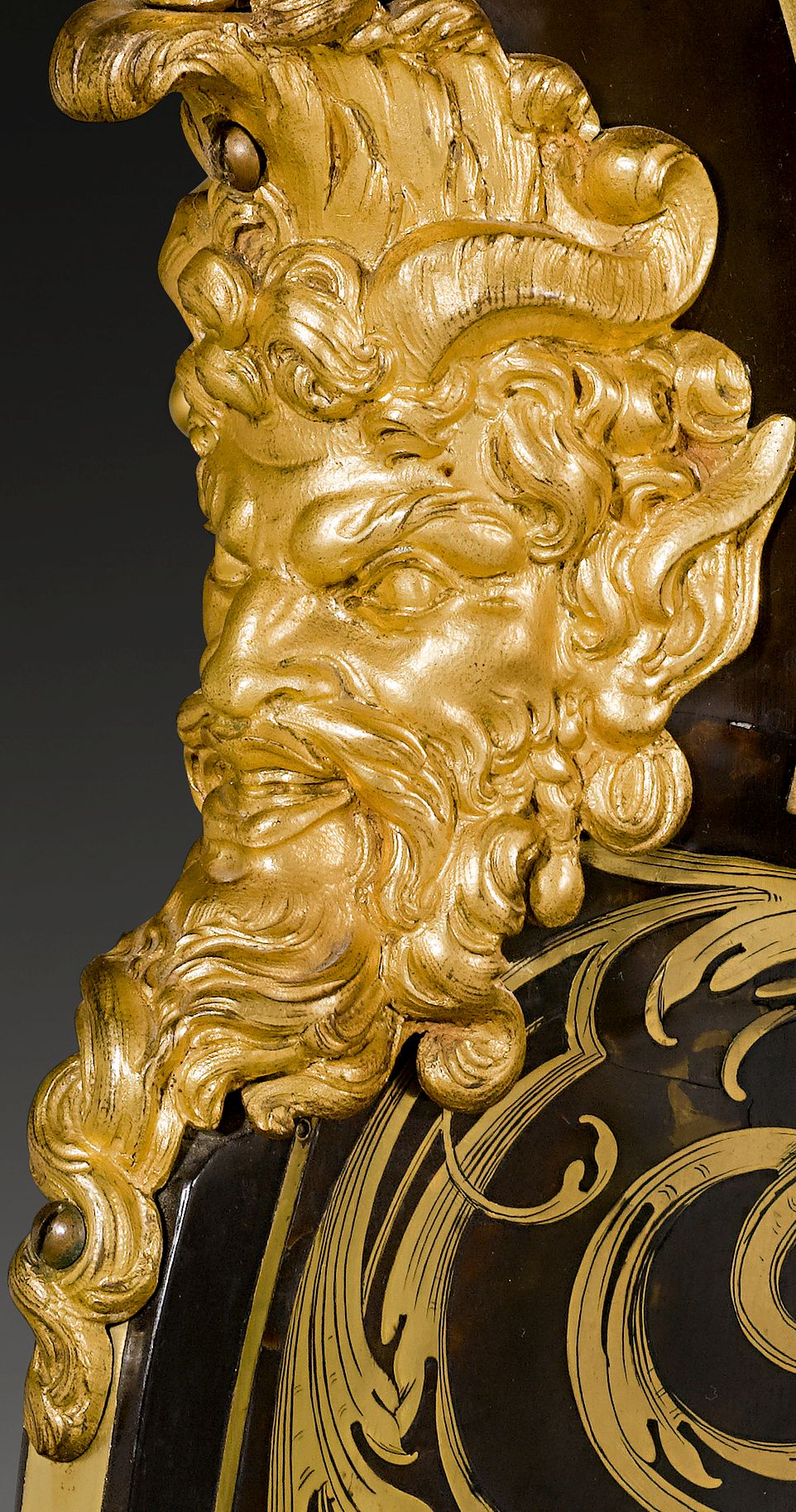
Brass work by Boulle

Henry IV established the privileged status for the artists in 1608 in a lettre patente (royal decree) in which he stated his express purpose of encouraging the flourishing of the arts in France through a sort of cross-pollenisation and co-operation. The inhabitants enjoyed the status for life which freed then from the strict laws of the guild system and granted other legal and fiscal benefits. The system was very important to André Charles Boulle who was granted the prestige of a workshop in 1672, the same year he was named ébéniste, ciseleur, doreur du roi (cabinet maker, chaser, gilder to the King) by Maria Theresa (1638–1683), Louis XIV's wife and queen. The space was too small for a furniture production workshop of any scale, so basically served as a calling card or prestigious address for Boulle who still possessed his family workshop on Rue de Reims on the left bank, and was eventually granted a large space of over 500 square meters in an abandoned theatre in the Louvre. (Jean Nérée Ronfort, exhibition catalogue) In addition, the lack of guild control allowed Boulle, who was also trained as a sculptor, to create and cast his own gilt bronze mounts for his furniture. From 1685, he possessed his own foundry, a critical aspect to the originality of his work. Boulle also created objects purely in gilt-bronze such as chandeliers, clocks, firedogs, wall lights among others, which contributed greatly to his fame.

=== Pewter ===
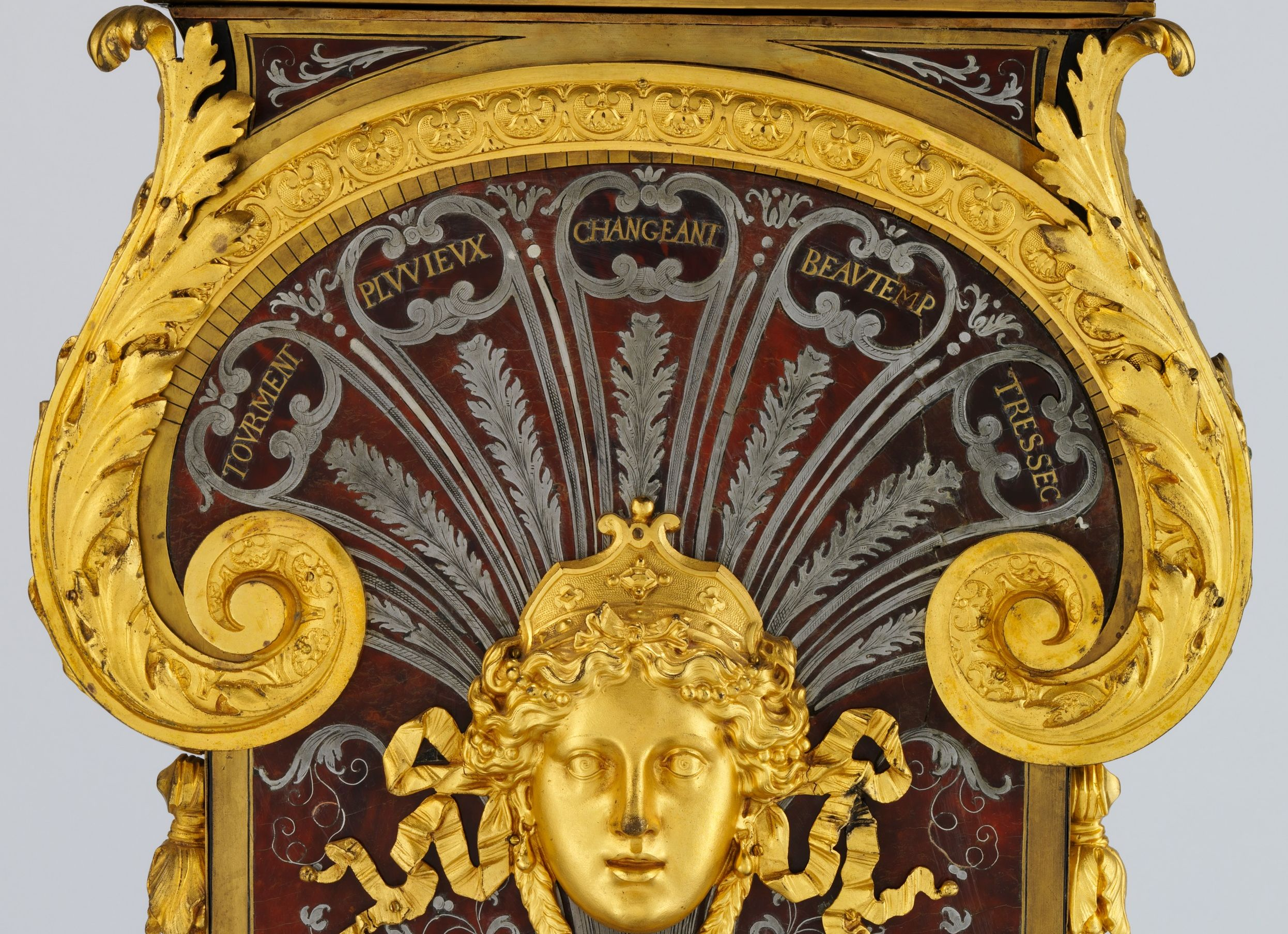
Fine Premier-Parti Pewter inlay onto tortoiseshell by André-Charles Boulle Clock held at the Metropolitan Museum of Arts, New York City

'Pewter or brass inlay on tortoiseshell was known as premier-partie, while tortoiseshell inlay on brass or pewter was contre-partie. For an even more sumptuous effect, mother-of-pearl, stained horn and dyed tortoiseshell would be included in the design.'

== Works ==
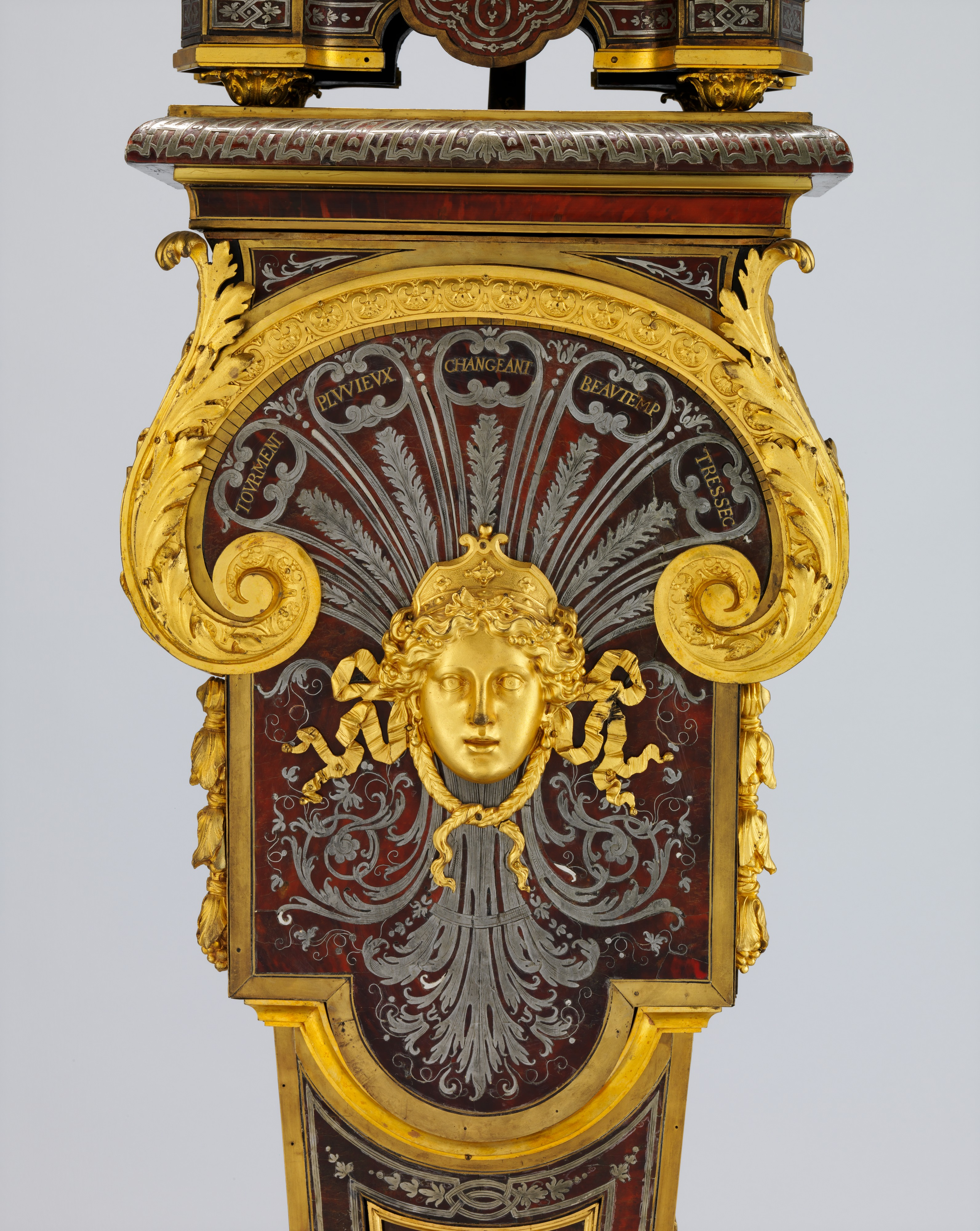
André-Charles Boulle, circa 1690. Clock with Case and pedestal of oak with marquetry of tortoiseshell, engraved brass, and pewter; gilt bronze; dial of gilt brass with white enameled Arabic numerals; movement of brass and steell

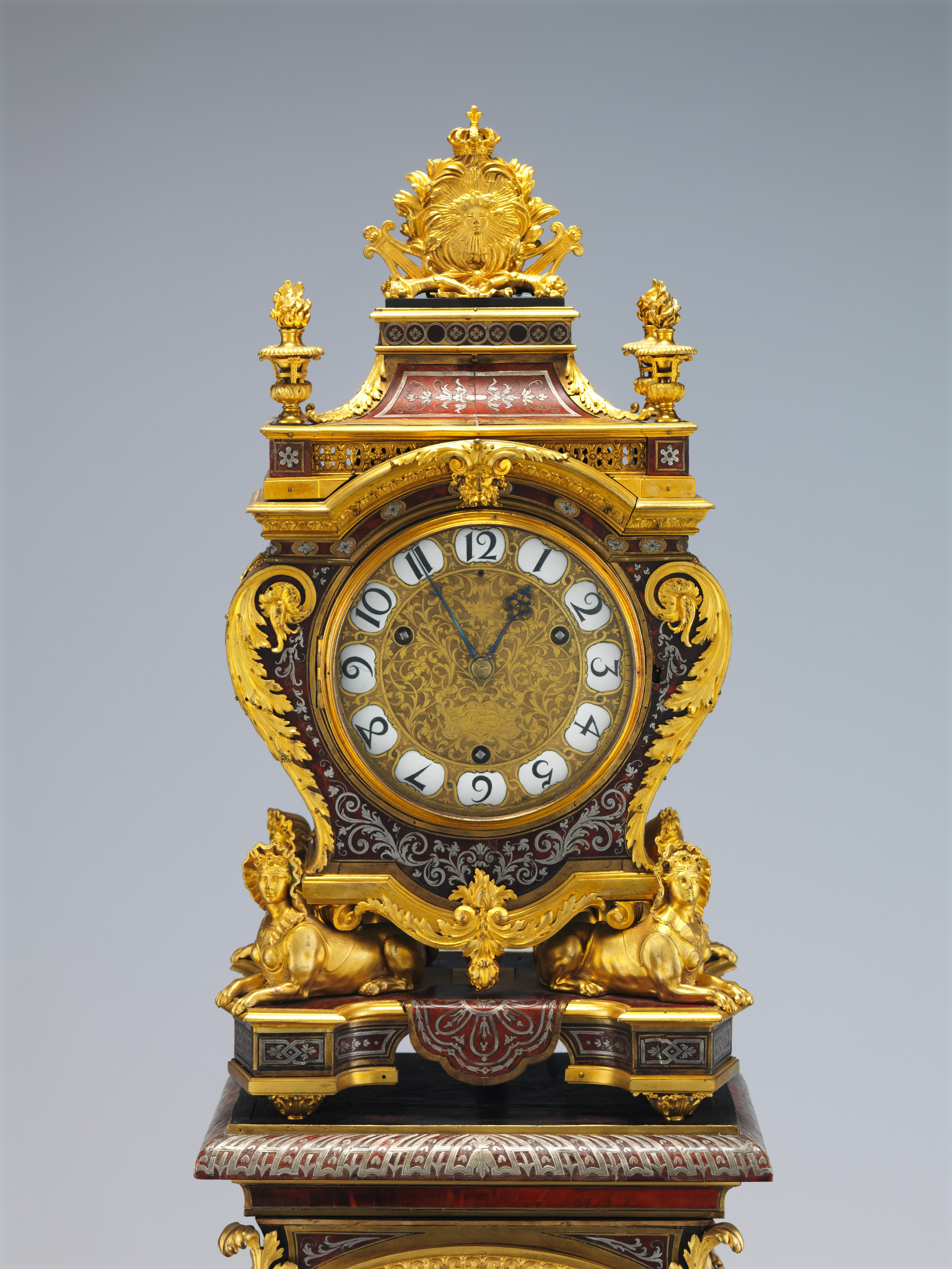
André-Charles Boulle circa 1690. Clock with pedestal. Case and pedestal of oak with marquetry of tortoiseshell, engraved brass, and pewter; gilt bronze; dial of gilt brass with white enameled Arabic numerals; movement of brass and steel

André-Charles Boulle kept no accurate records of his output. The identification of furniture produced by Boulle's workshop is hampered by a lack of documentation of the pieces he created. His sons carried on the traditions for some years after his death but his imitators were many and capable. A few of the pedigree-pieces are among the worlds mobiliary treasures. Rather than having his own internal system of identification or poinçon or mark on each piece, he depended on the records kept by the Bâtiments du Roi. These, did not identify new works with specific entry numbers as they were being produced nor did they keep a detailed daily journal of output. Had Boulle used the royal wardrobe, the Garde-Meuble de la Couronne to identify and record his output, things might have turned out differently.

Of his many royal commissions, only a pair of commodes delivered in 1708 and 1709 to the King at the Grand Trianon can be securely linked to any sort of documentation to confirm provenance. A series of grand armoires in the Louvre Museum and the Wallace Collection are also securely attributed to his workshop. Identification of some of Boulle's works based on the tell-tale refinements of the marquetry and the re-use of marquetry templates and characteristic boldly sculptured gilt-bronze mounts can at times be provenanced from three sets of images of furniture designs engraved by Boulle and published by his friend Pierre-Jean Mariette around 1720; pieces depicted in a series of workshop drawings traditionally ascribed to Boulle in the Musée des Arts Décoratifs, Paris and private collections; and the descriptions in the inventory of works in progress made when Boulle transferred legal ownership of the workshops to his sons in 1715.

A few of the pedigree-pieces are among the world's mobiliary treasures. There are, for instance, two famous armoires, which fetched 12,075 at the Hamilton Palace sale in 1882; the marquetry commodes, enriched with bronze mounts, formerly in the Bibliothèque Mazarine; various cabinets and commodes and tables in the Louvre, the Musée de Cluny and the Mobilier National; the marriage coffers of the Dauphin which were in the San Donato collection. There are several authenticated pieces in the Wallace Collection in London, together with others imitated, probably in the Louis XVI period. On the rare occasions when a pedigree example comes into the auction room, it commands a high price; but there can be little doubt that the specimens of Boulle are diminishing in number, while the second and third classes of his work are becoming more numerous. The truth is that this work, with its designs; its myriads of tiny pieces of ivory and copper, ebony and tortoiseshell, all kept together with glue and chased nails, and applied often to a soft, white wood, is not met to withstand the test of time and the variations of the atmosphere. Alternate heat and humidity are challenges of inlaid furniture than time and wear. Such objects were rarely used, and the most talented of the artists were employed by the crown.

== In museums ==
=== Louvre ===
Some of André-Charles Boulle’s art at the Louvre are shown below:

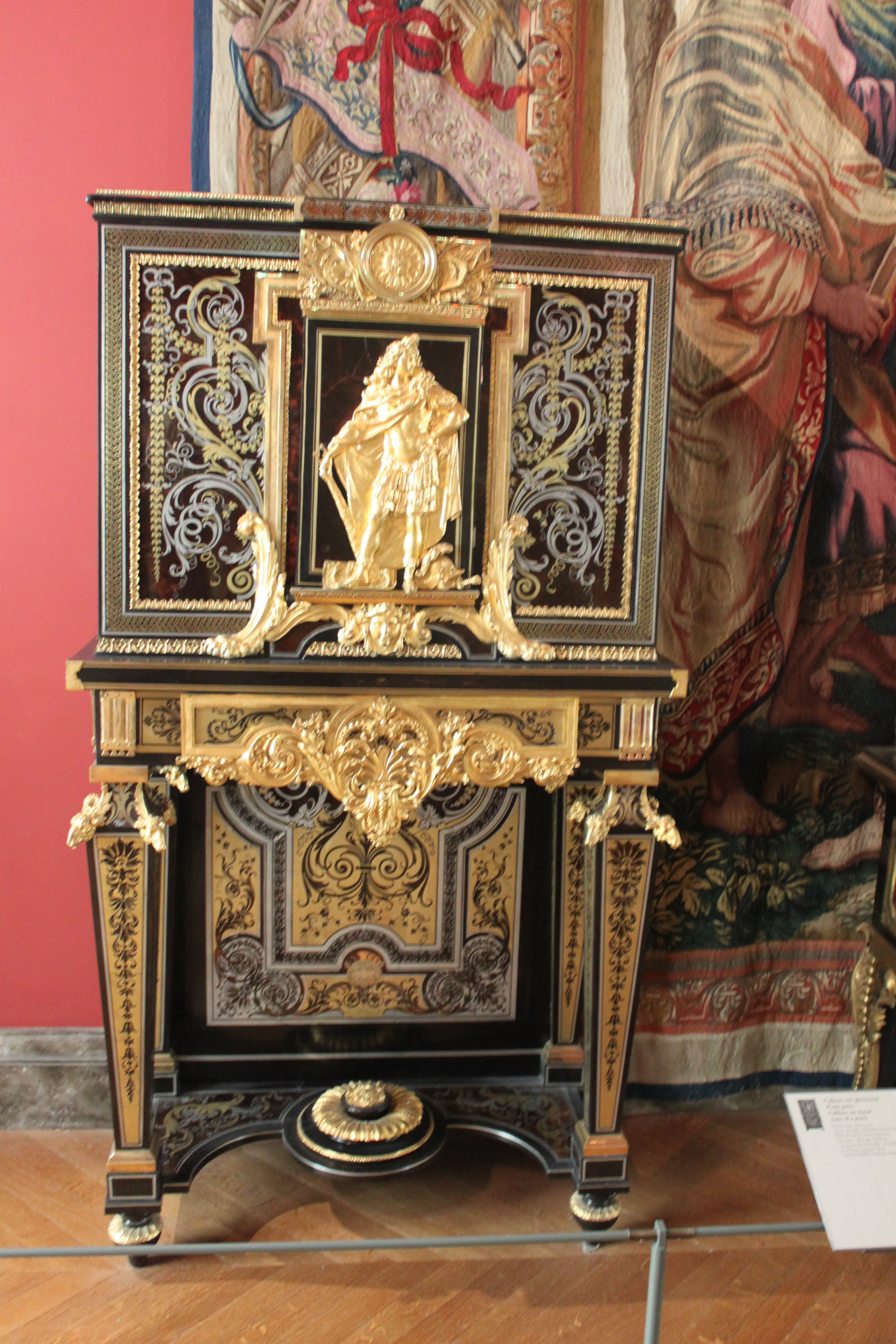

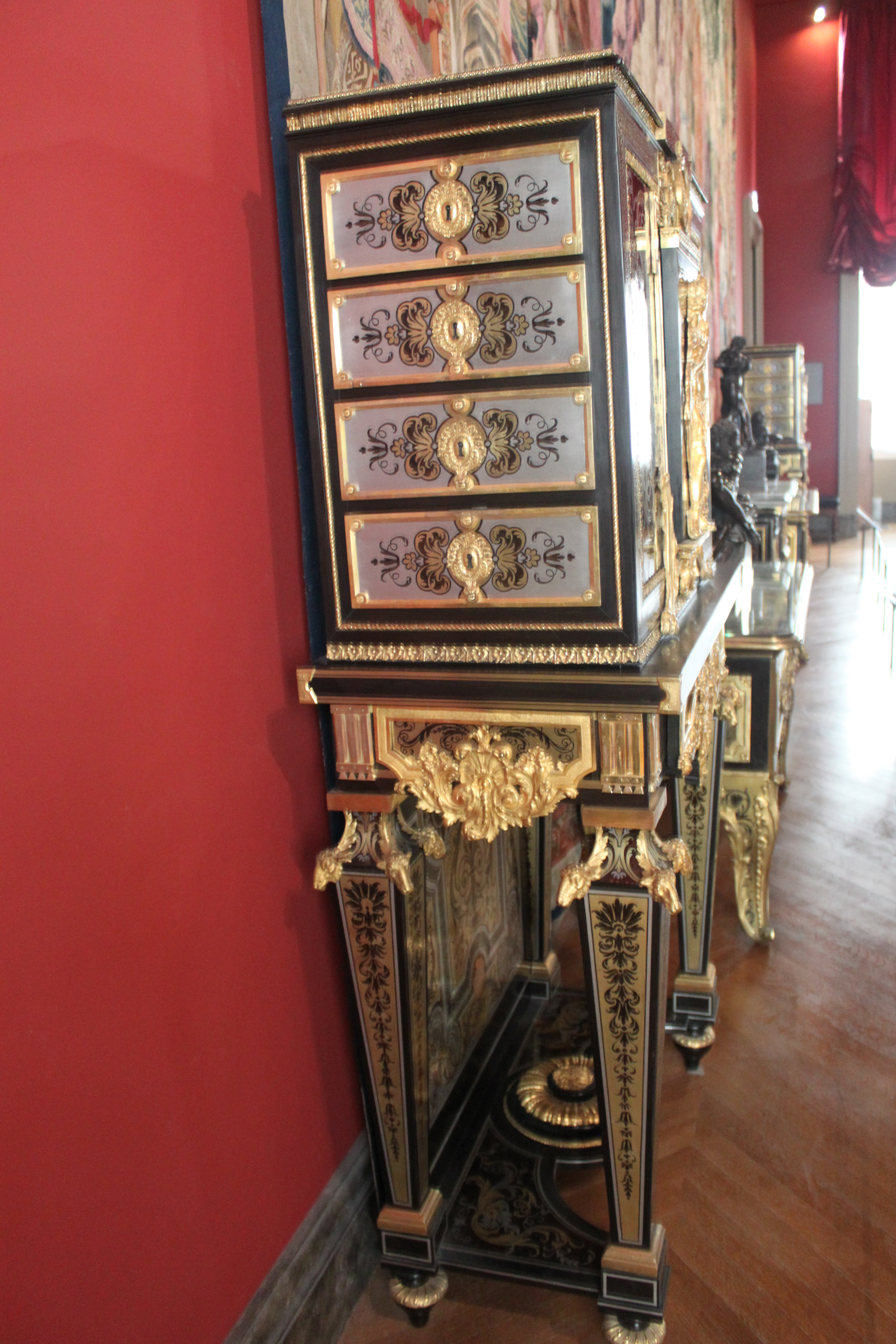

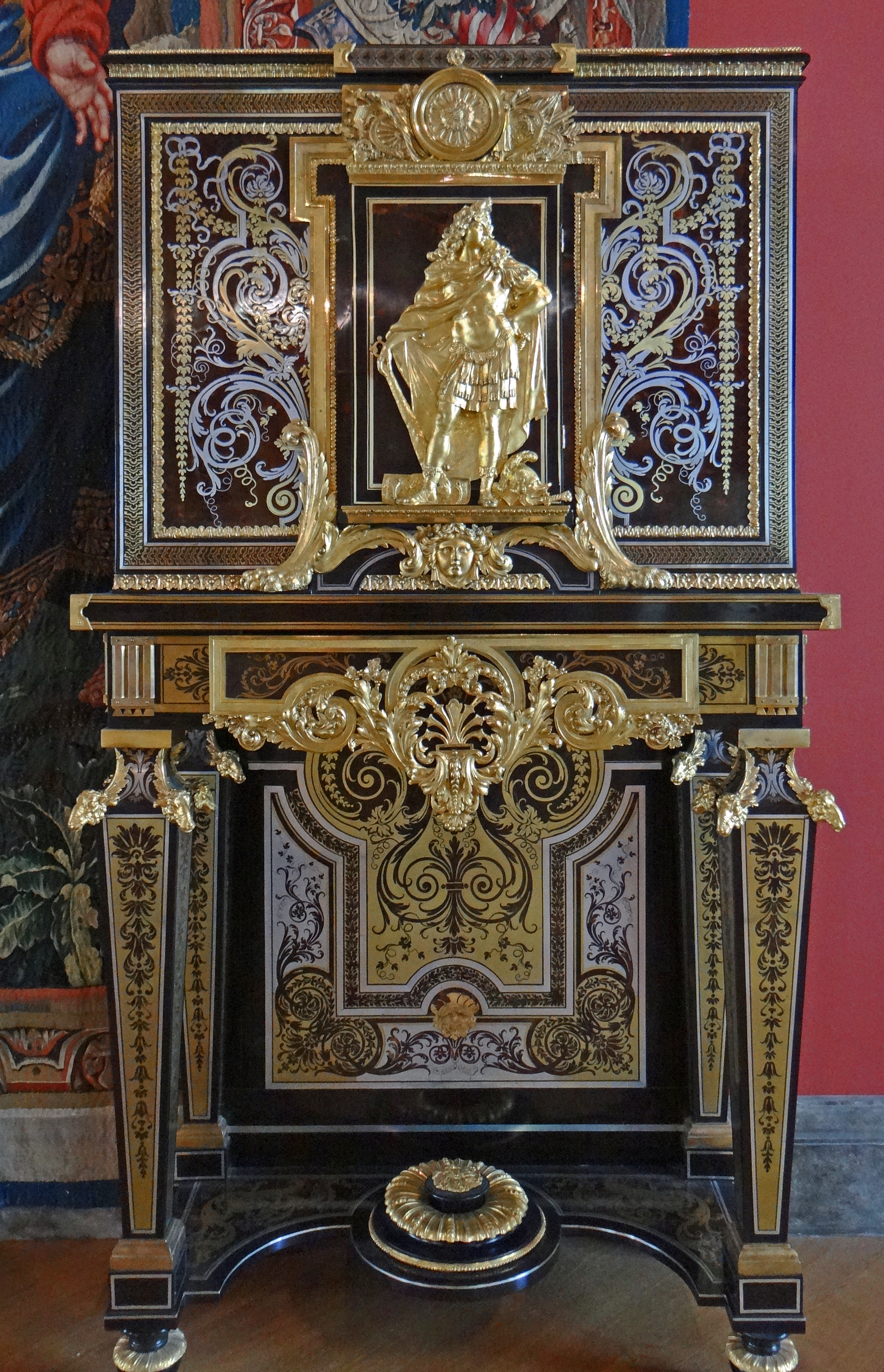

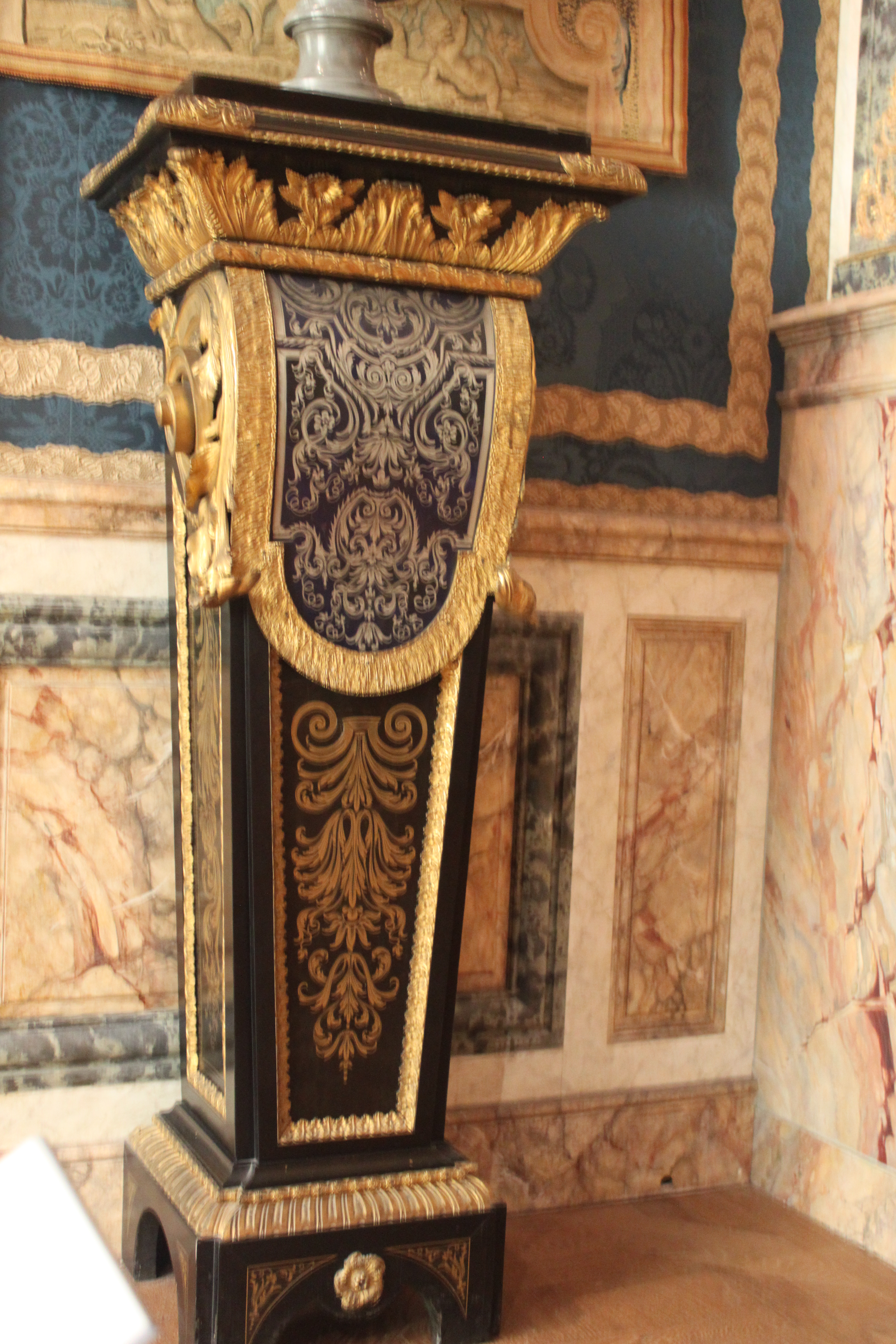

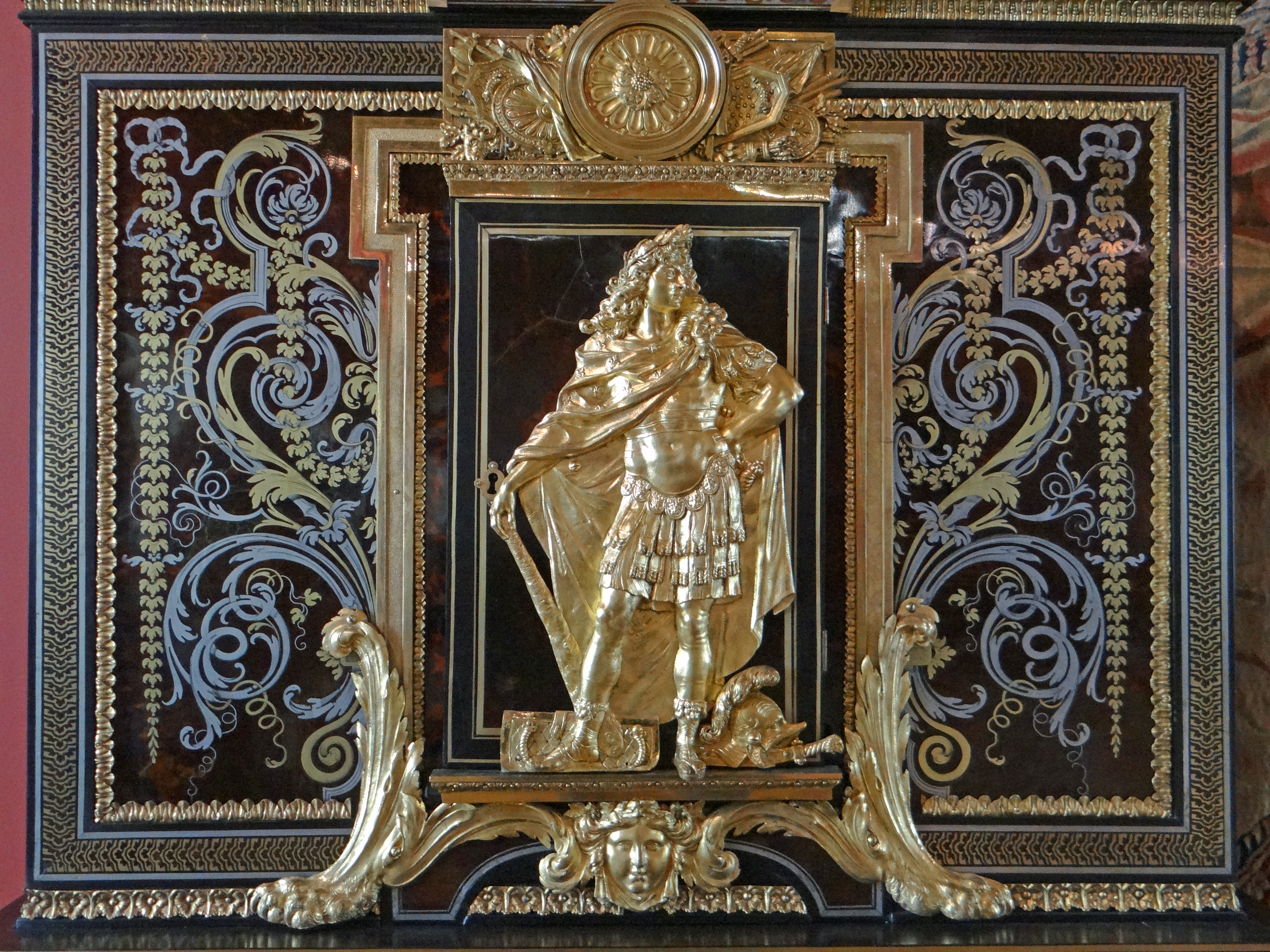

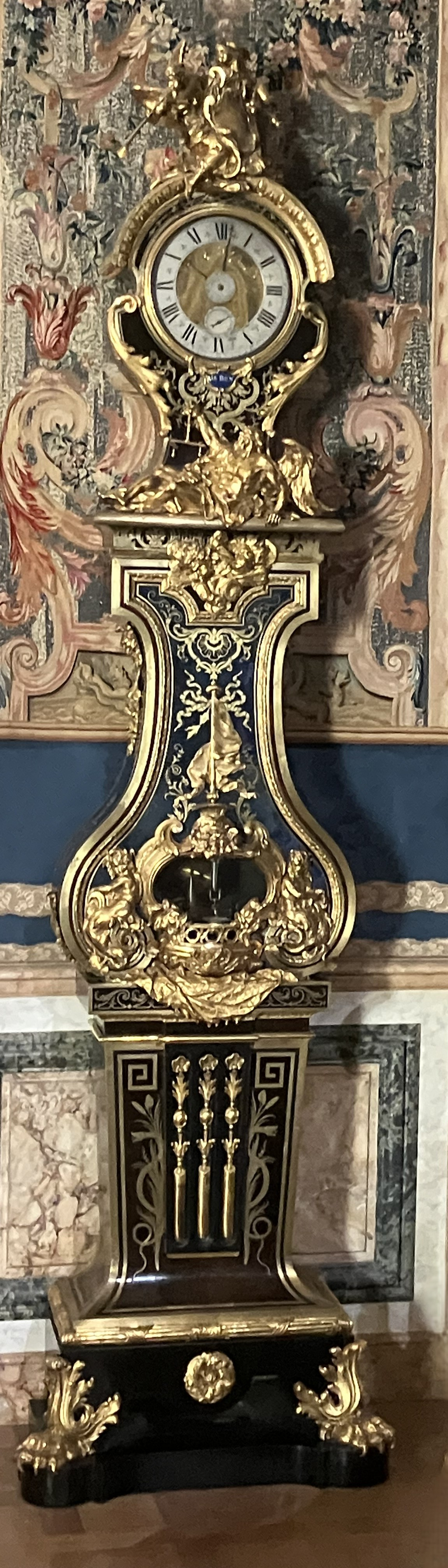

=== Metropolitan Museum of Art ===
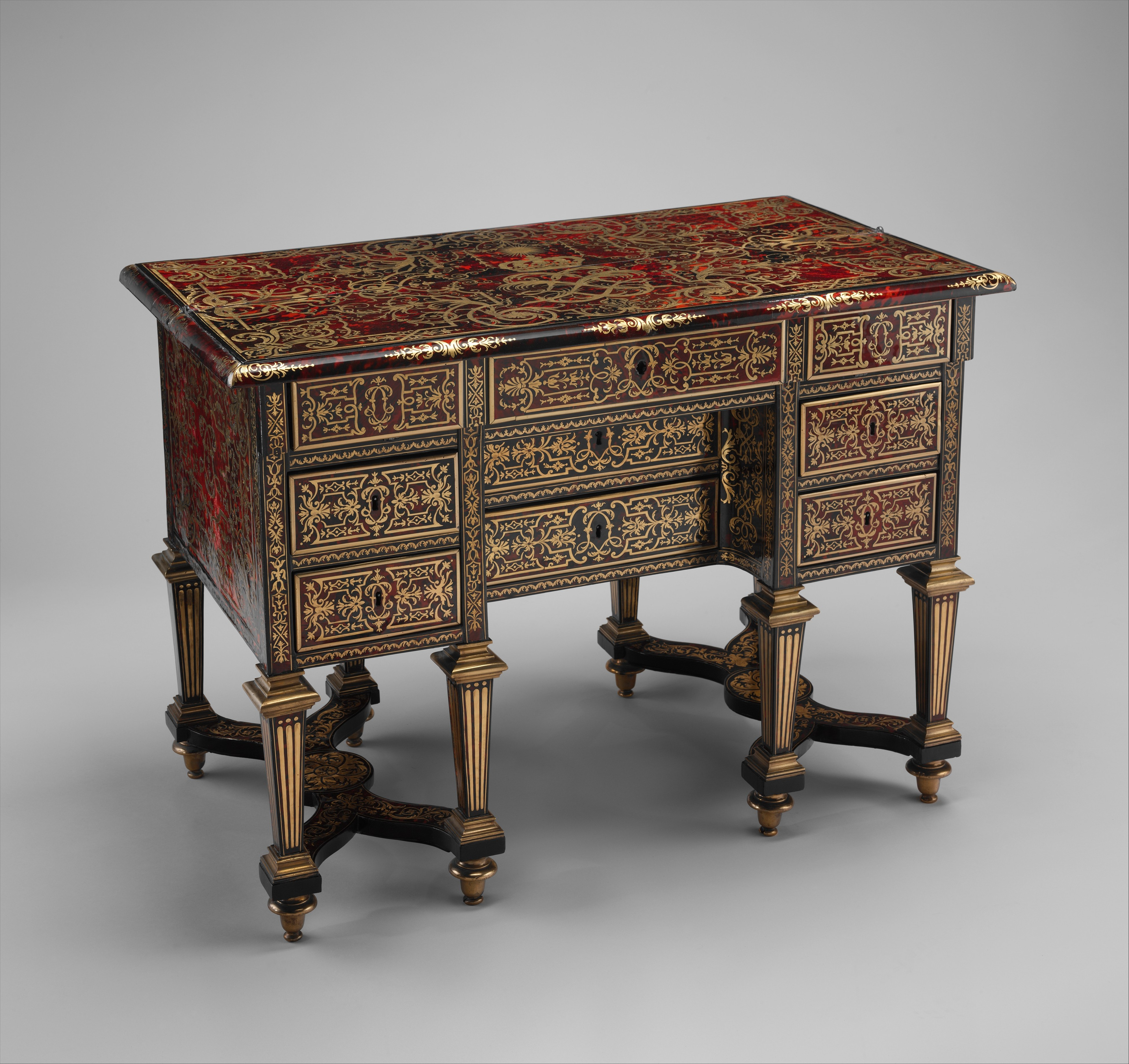

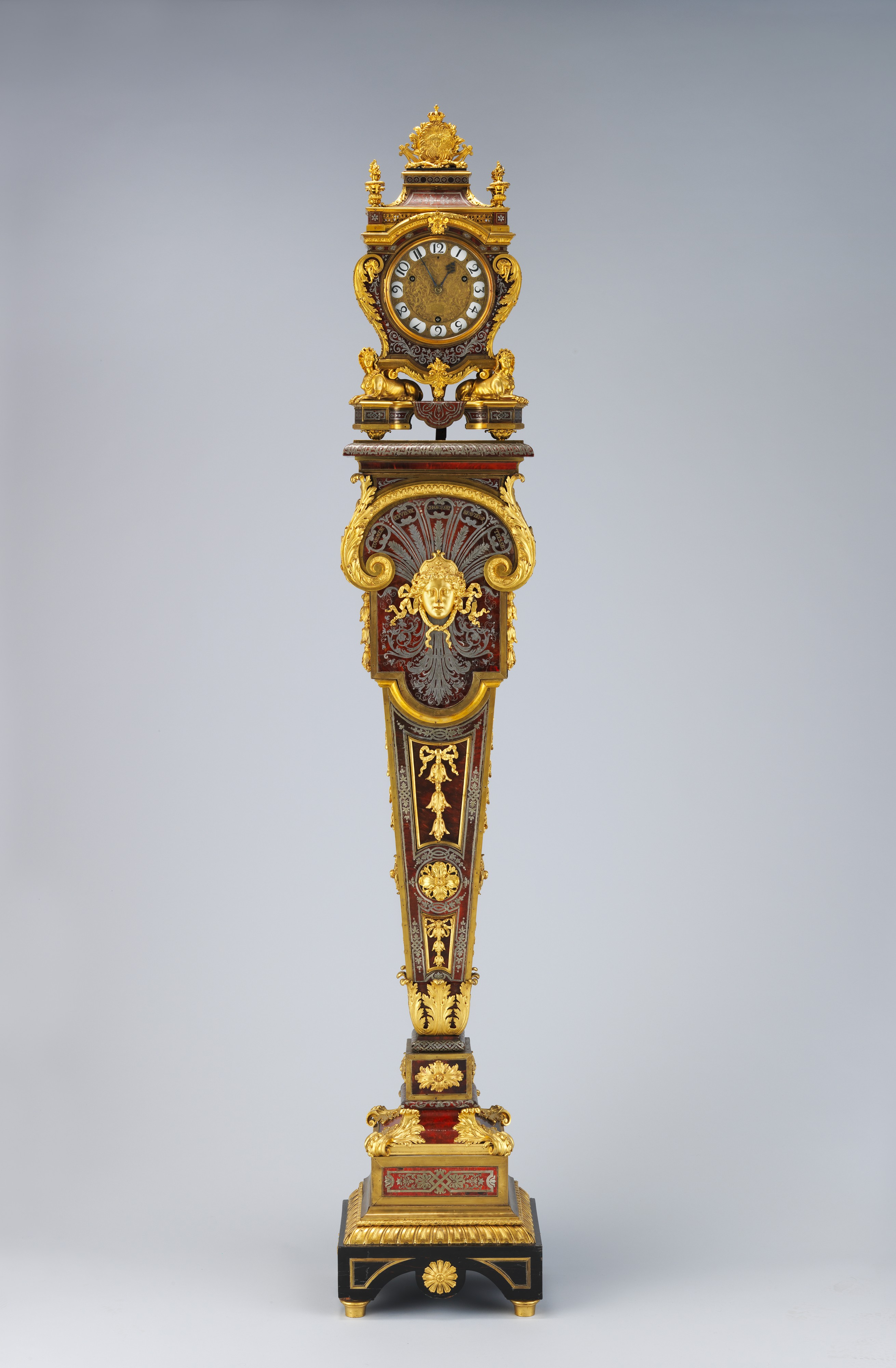

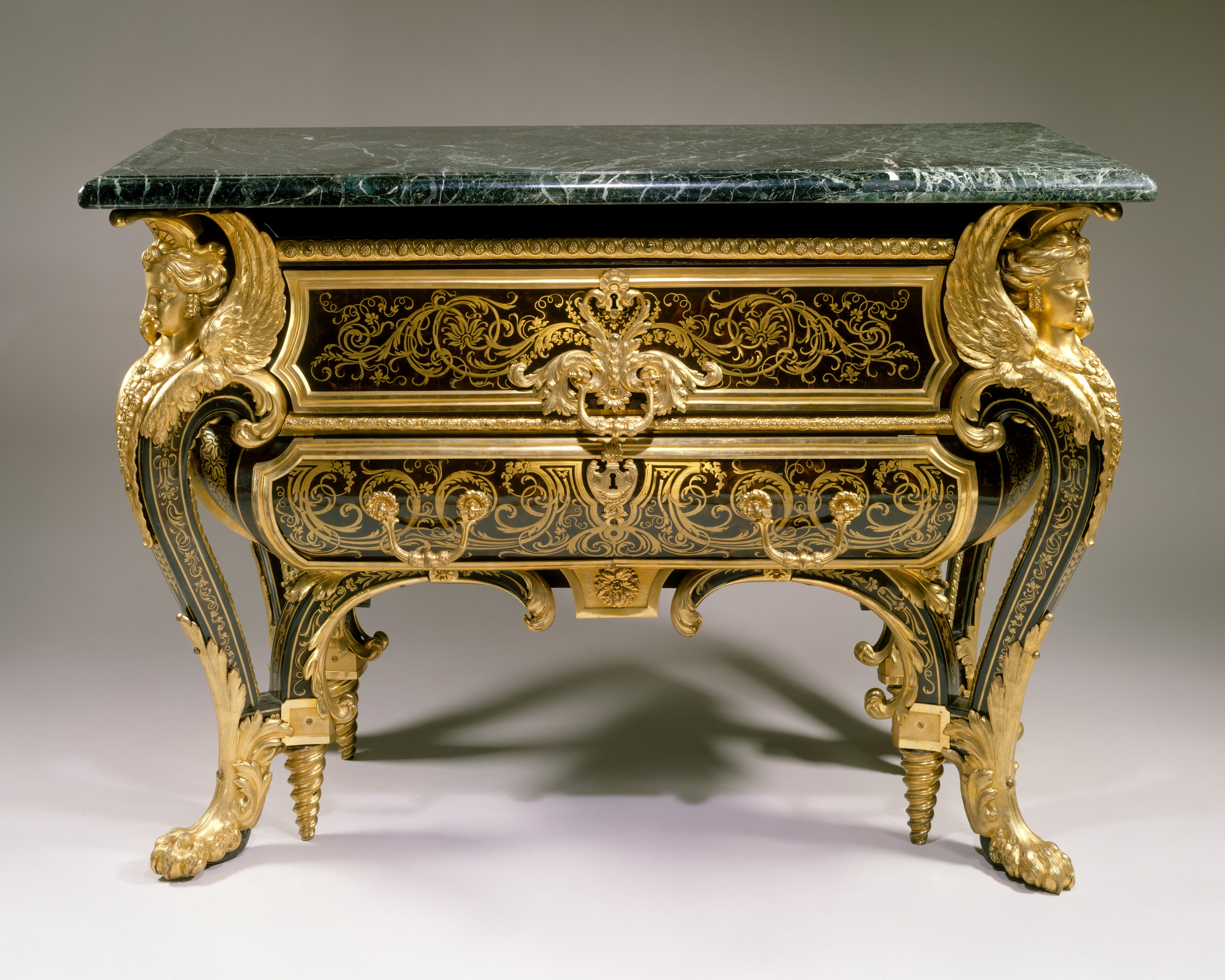

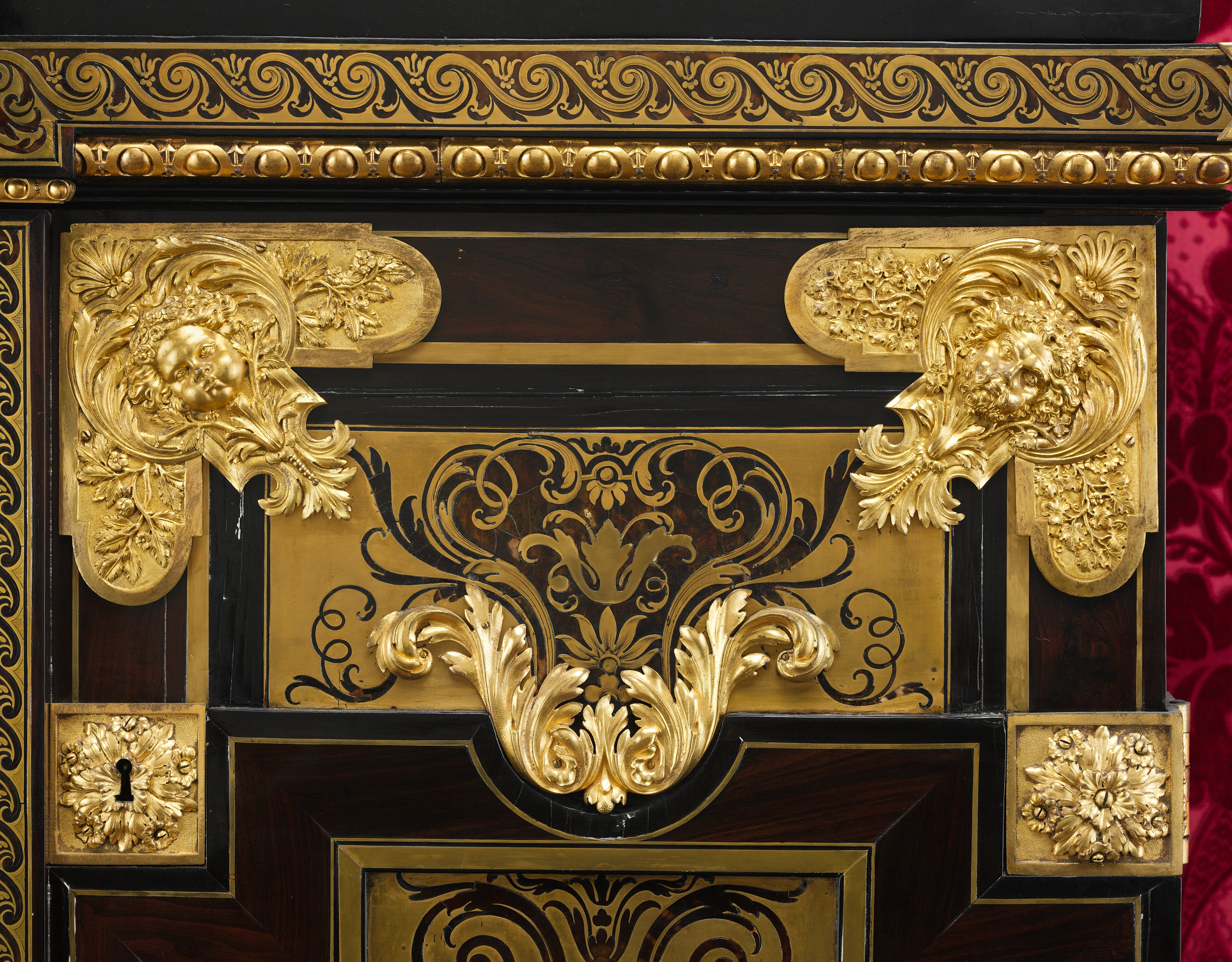

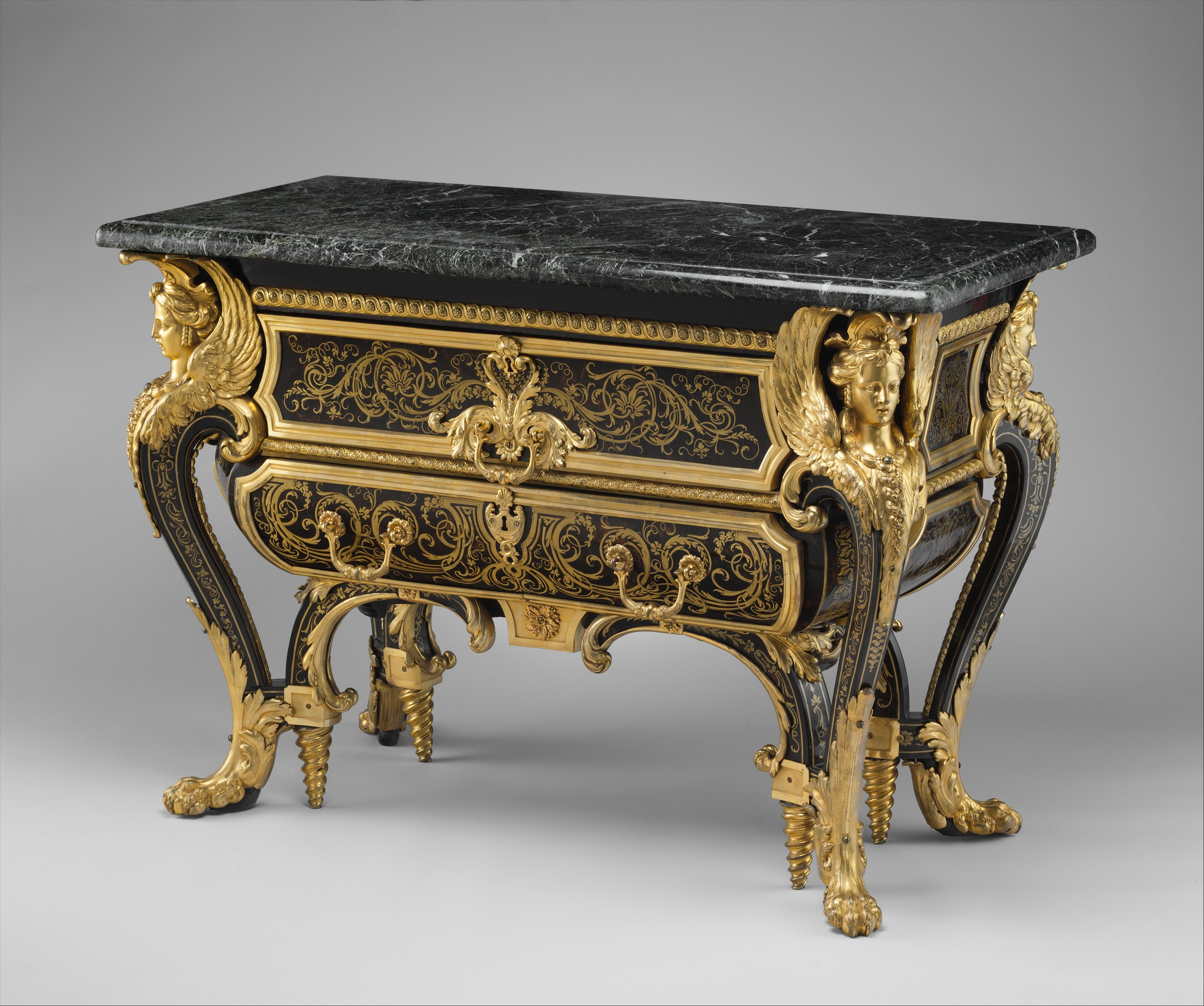

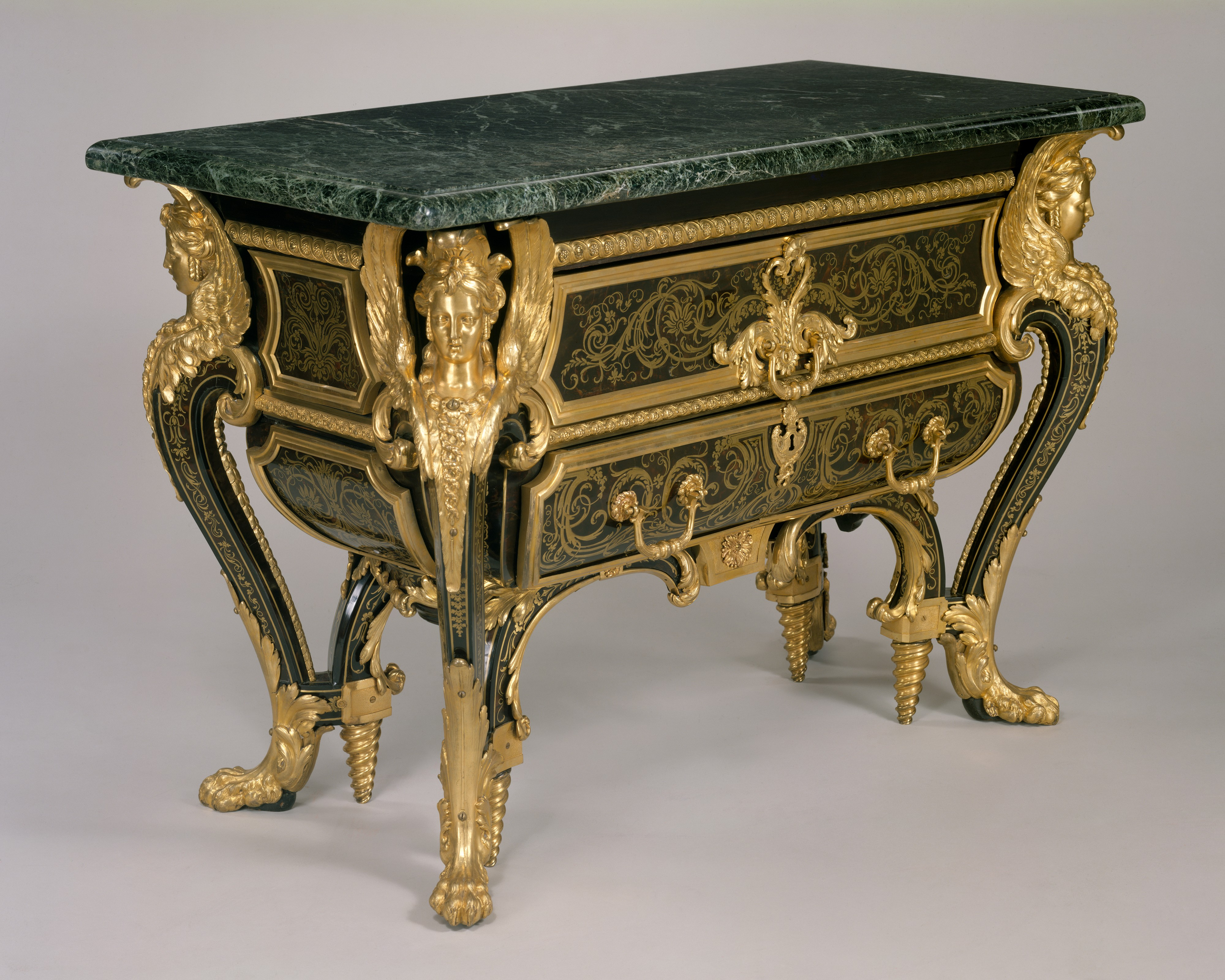

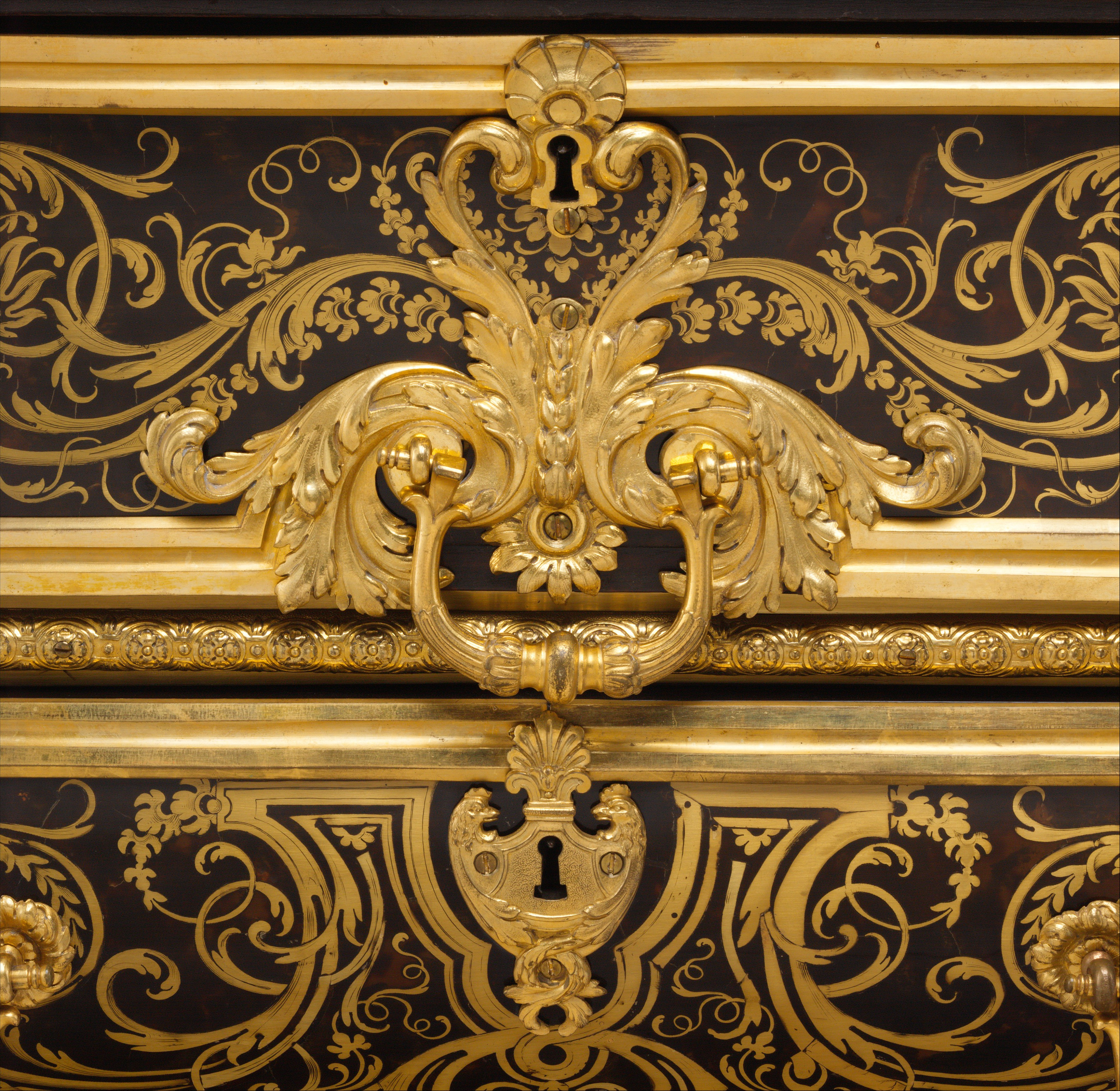

=== Indianapolis Museum of Art ===
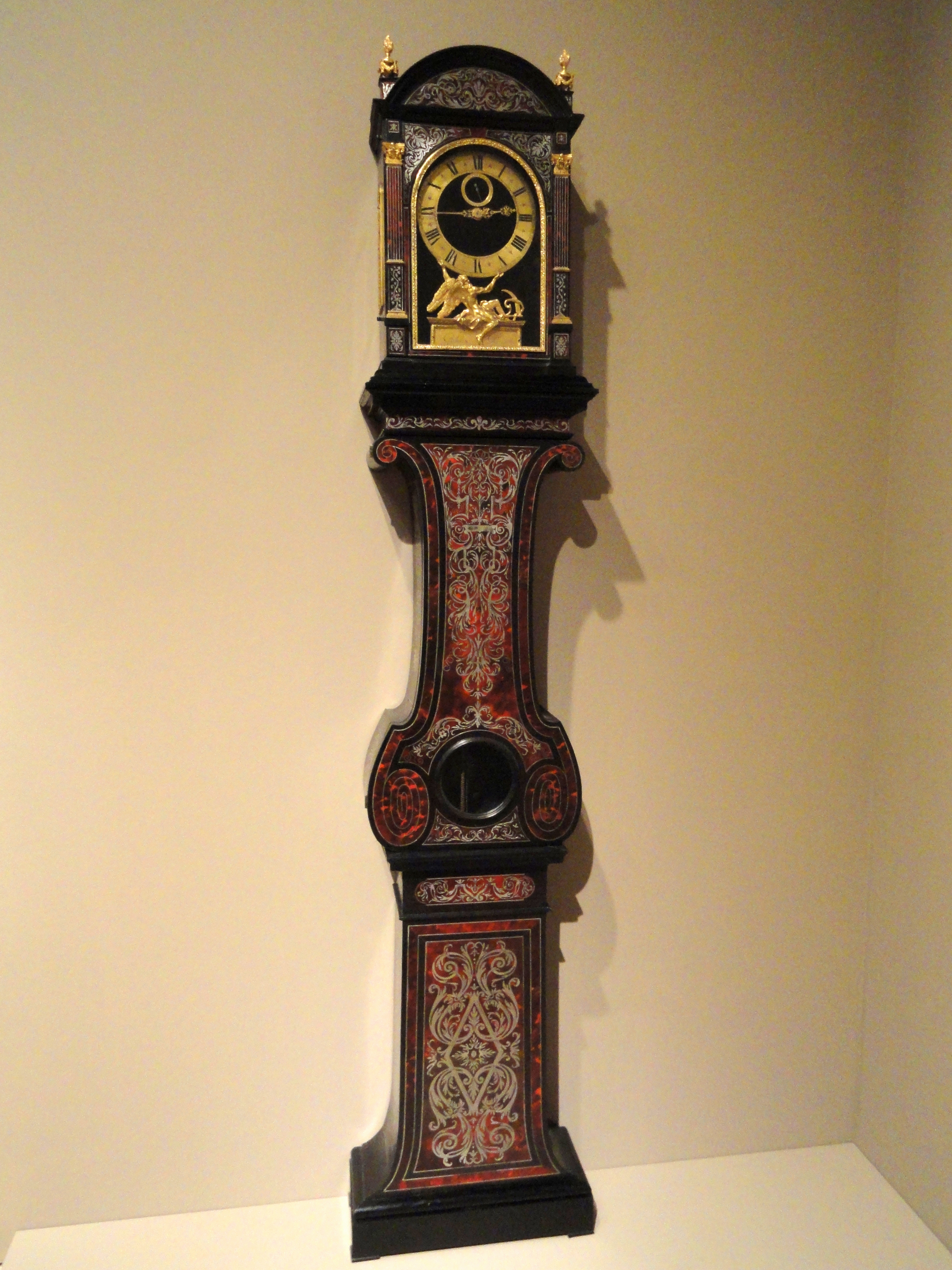
André-Charles Boulle - Longcase Regulator, Indianapolis Museum of Art

=== Wallace Collection ===
Some of the most spectacular works by Boulle are on display at the Large Drawing Room of the Wallace Collection in London:

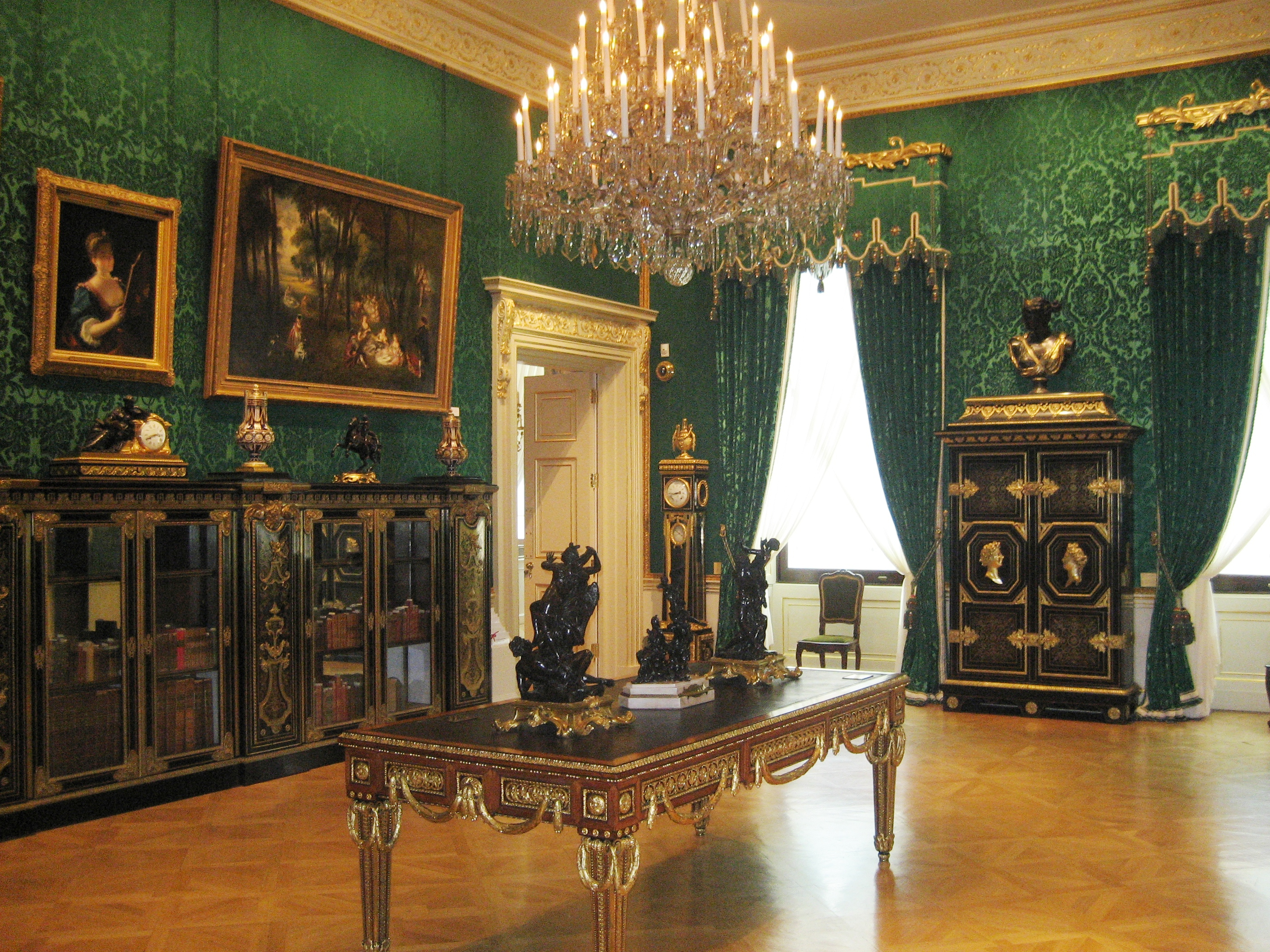
The Large Drawing Room with Boulle's works

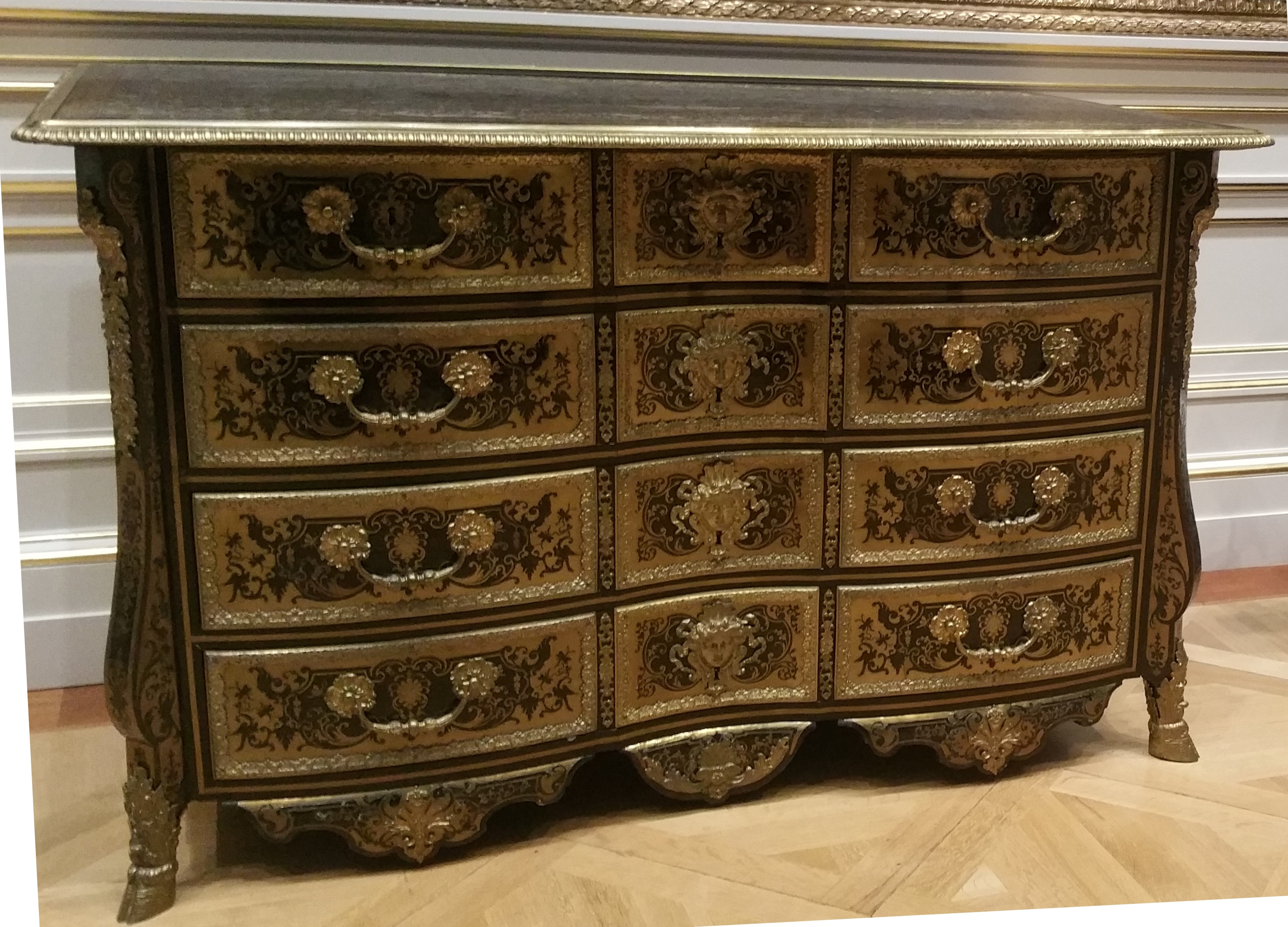

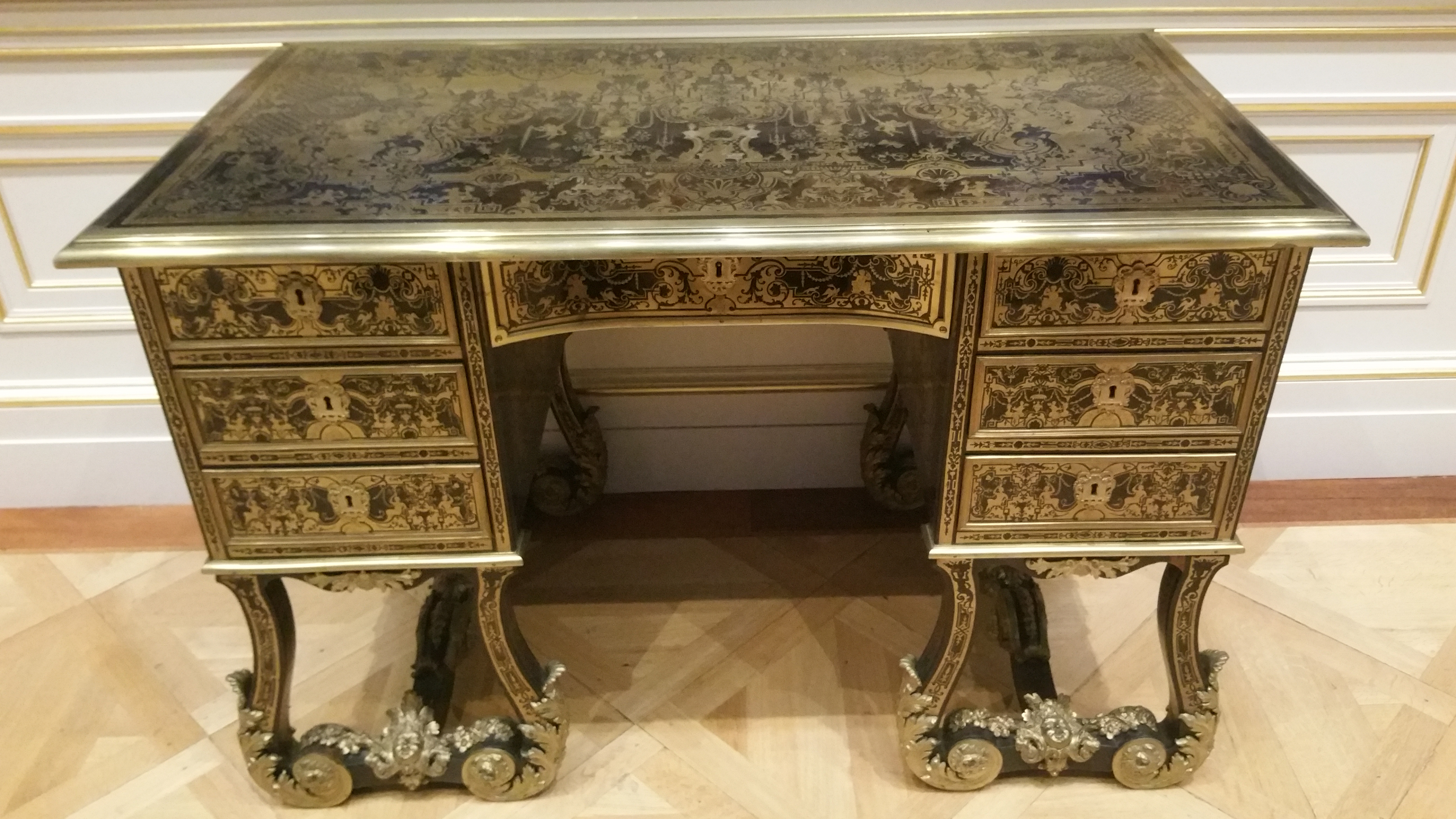

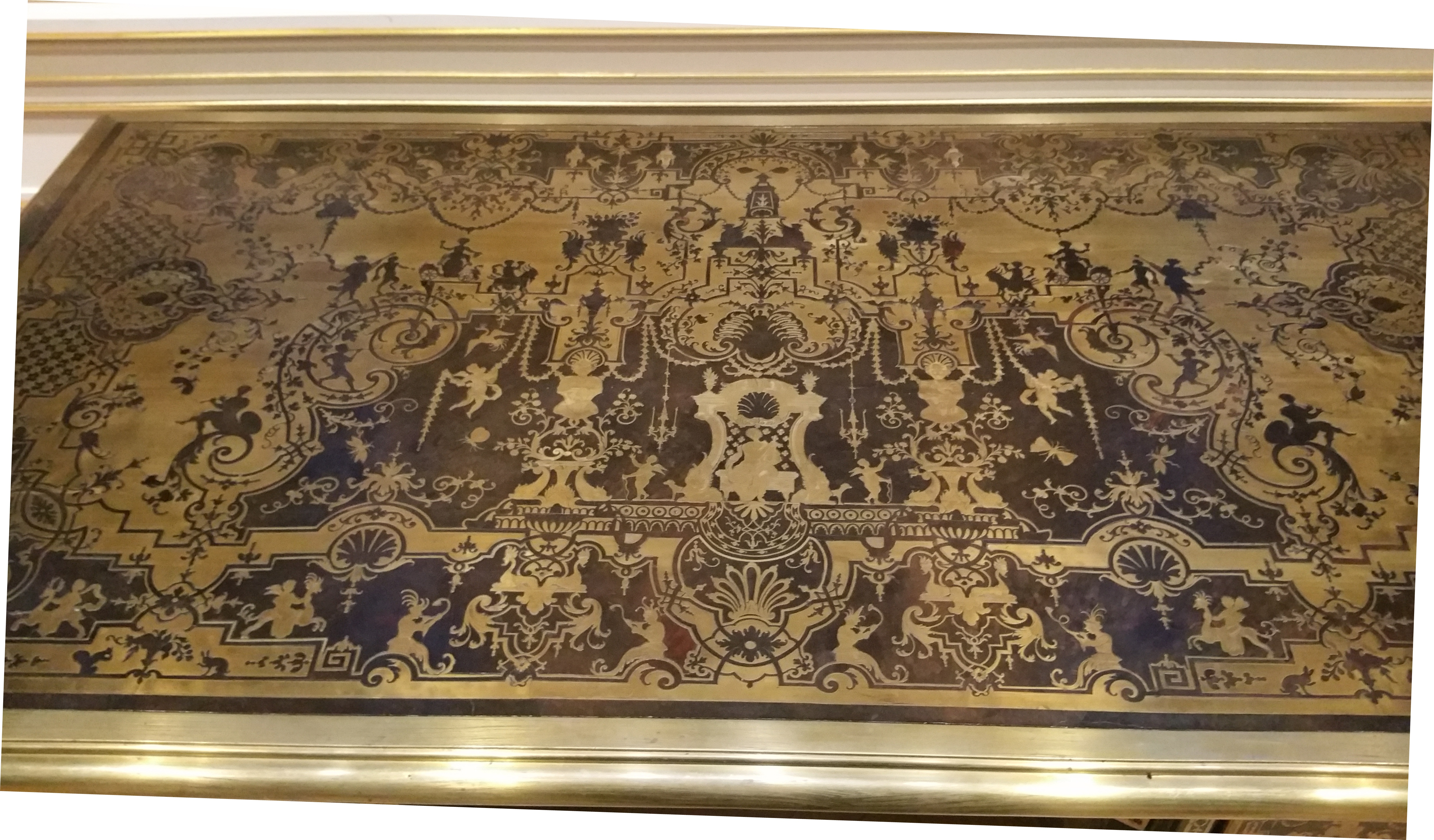

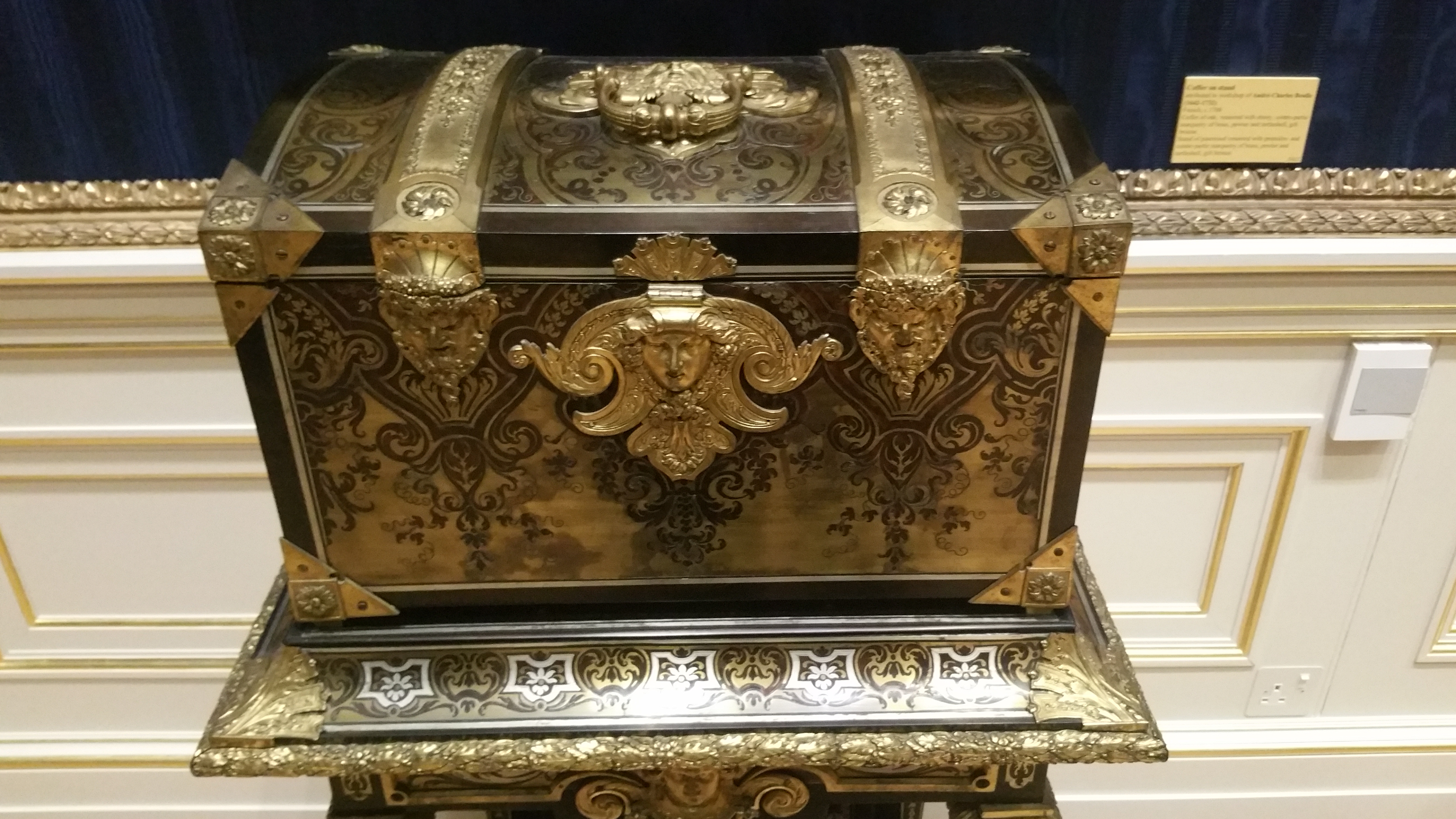

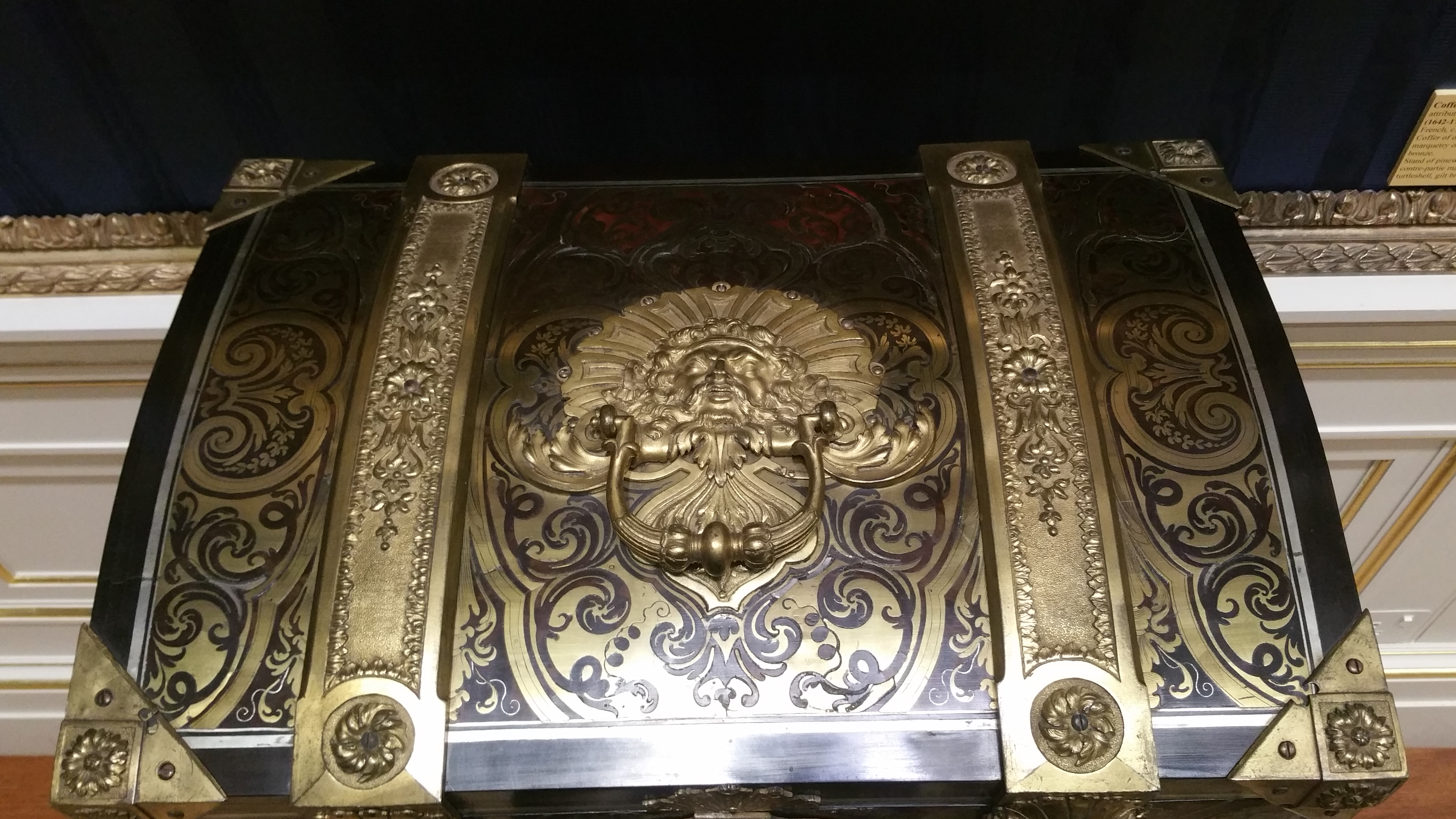

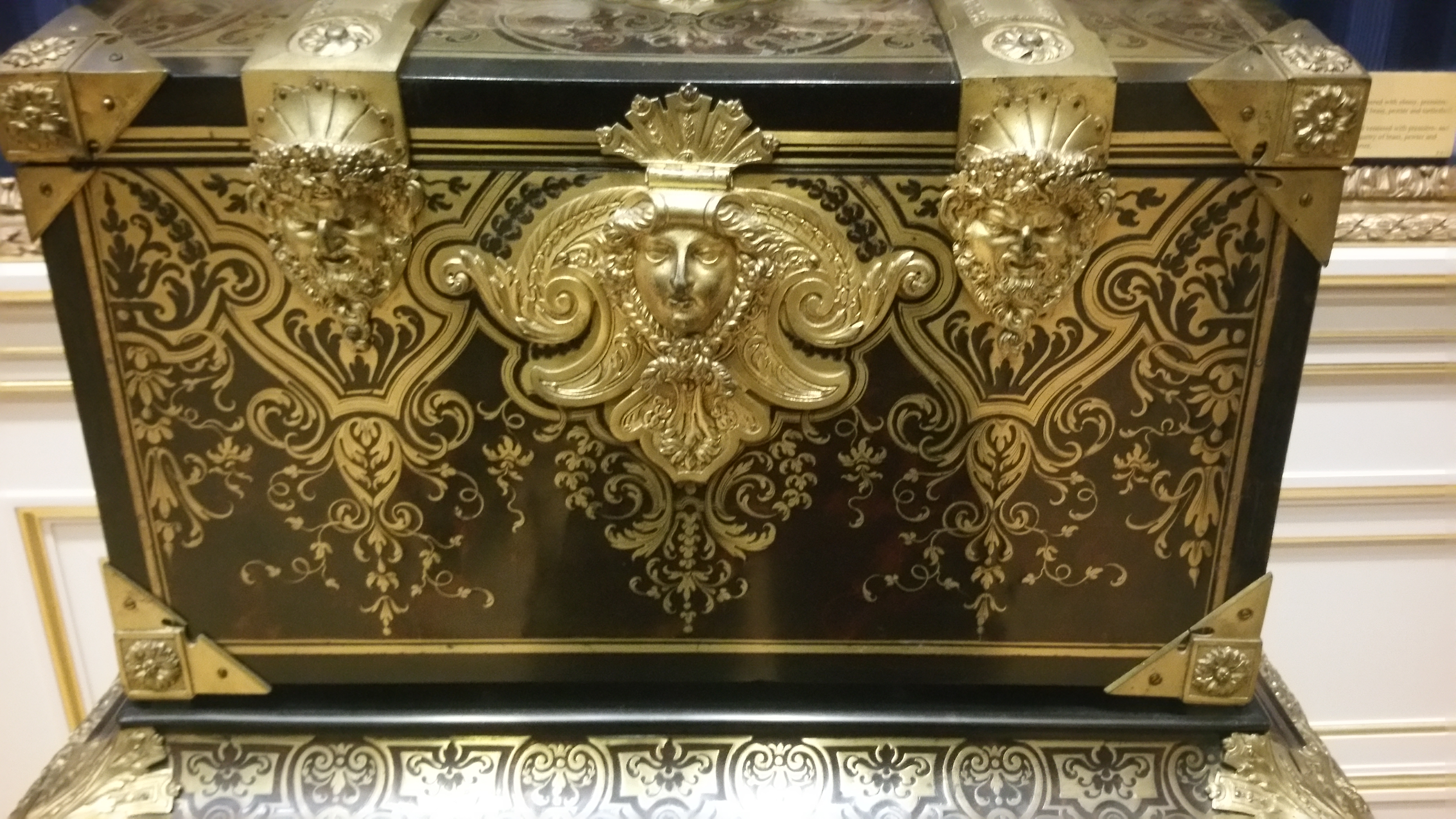

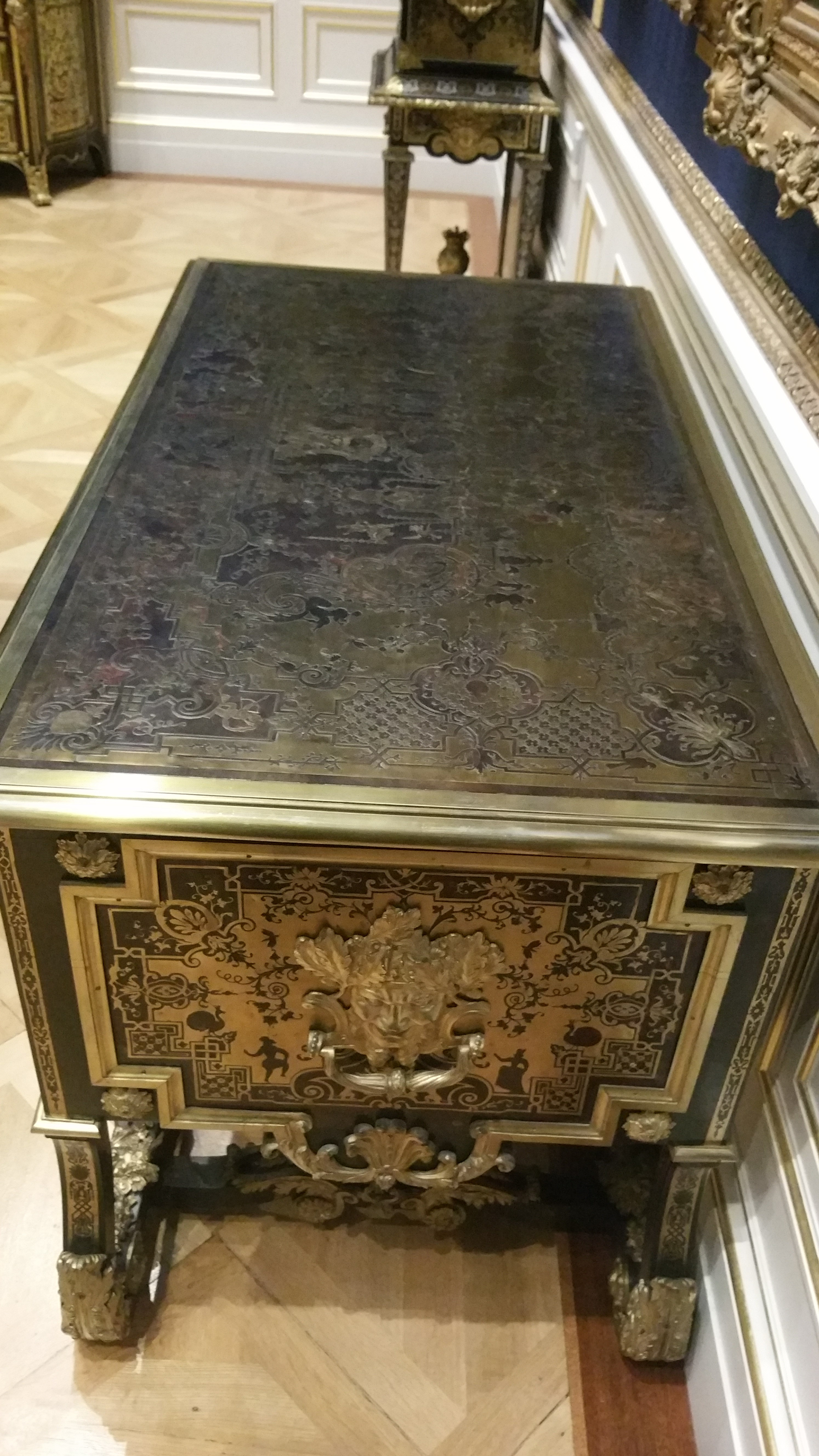

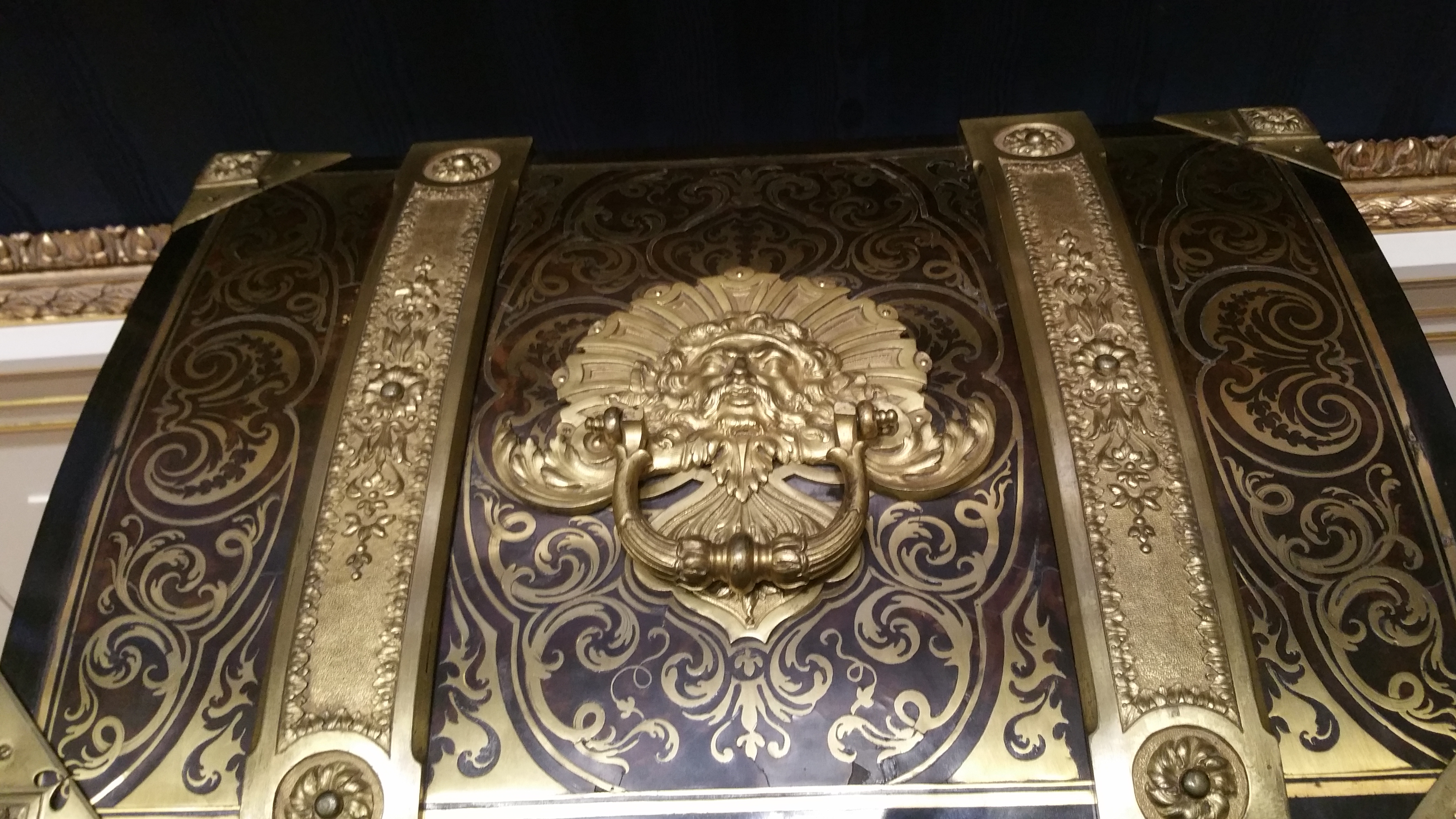

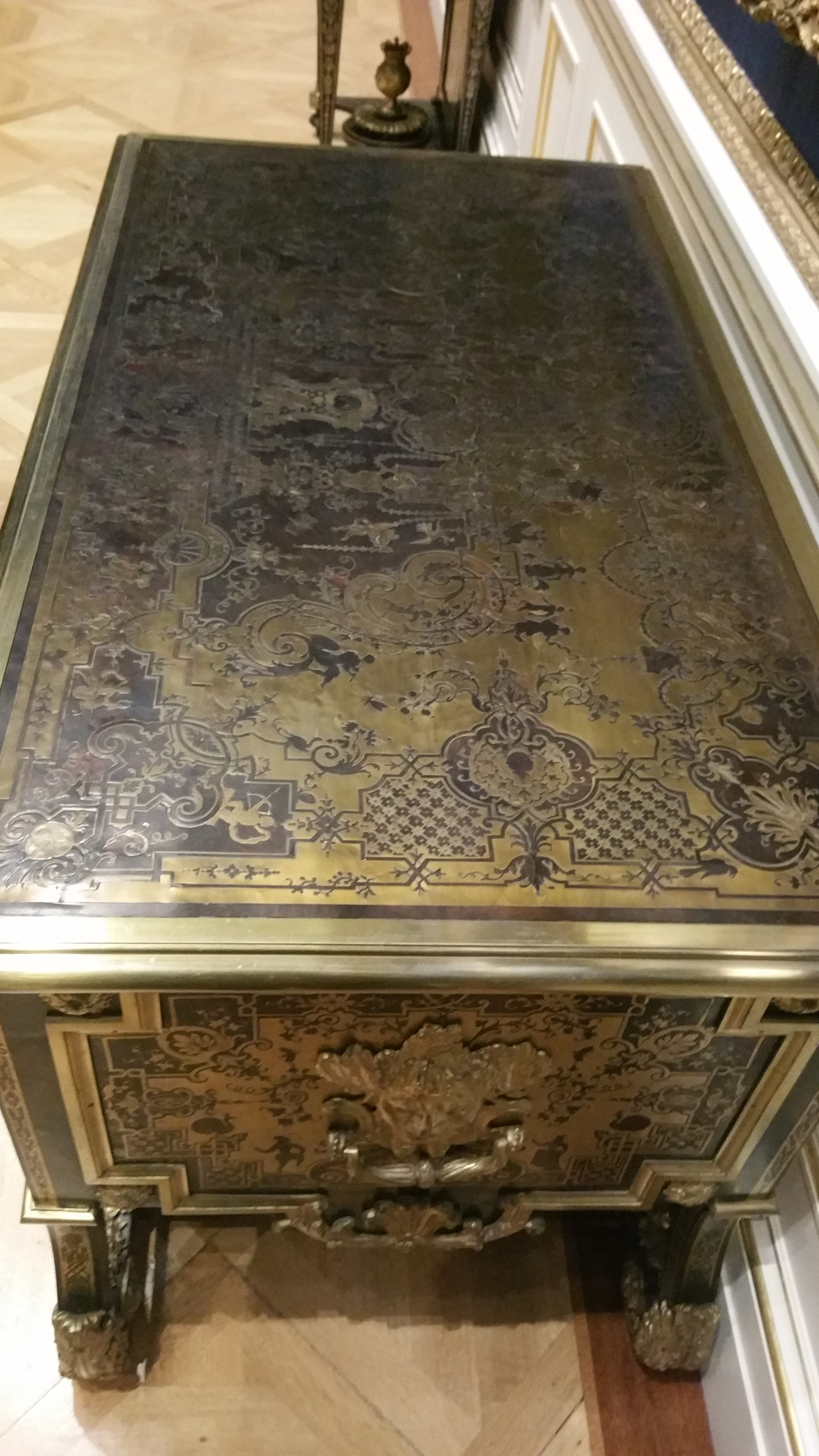

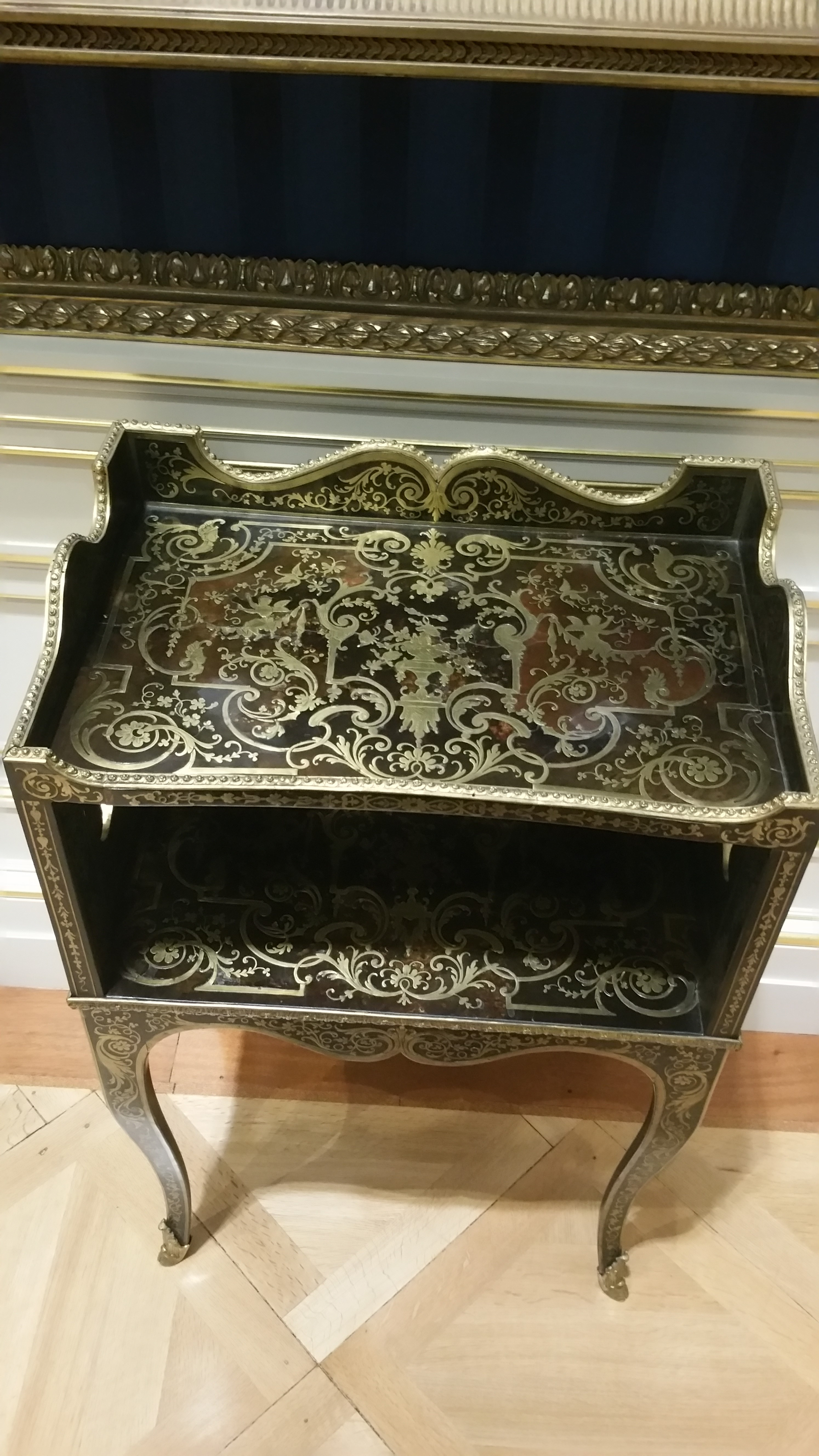

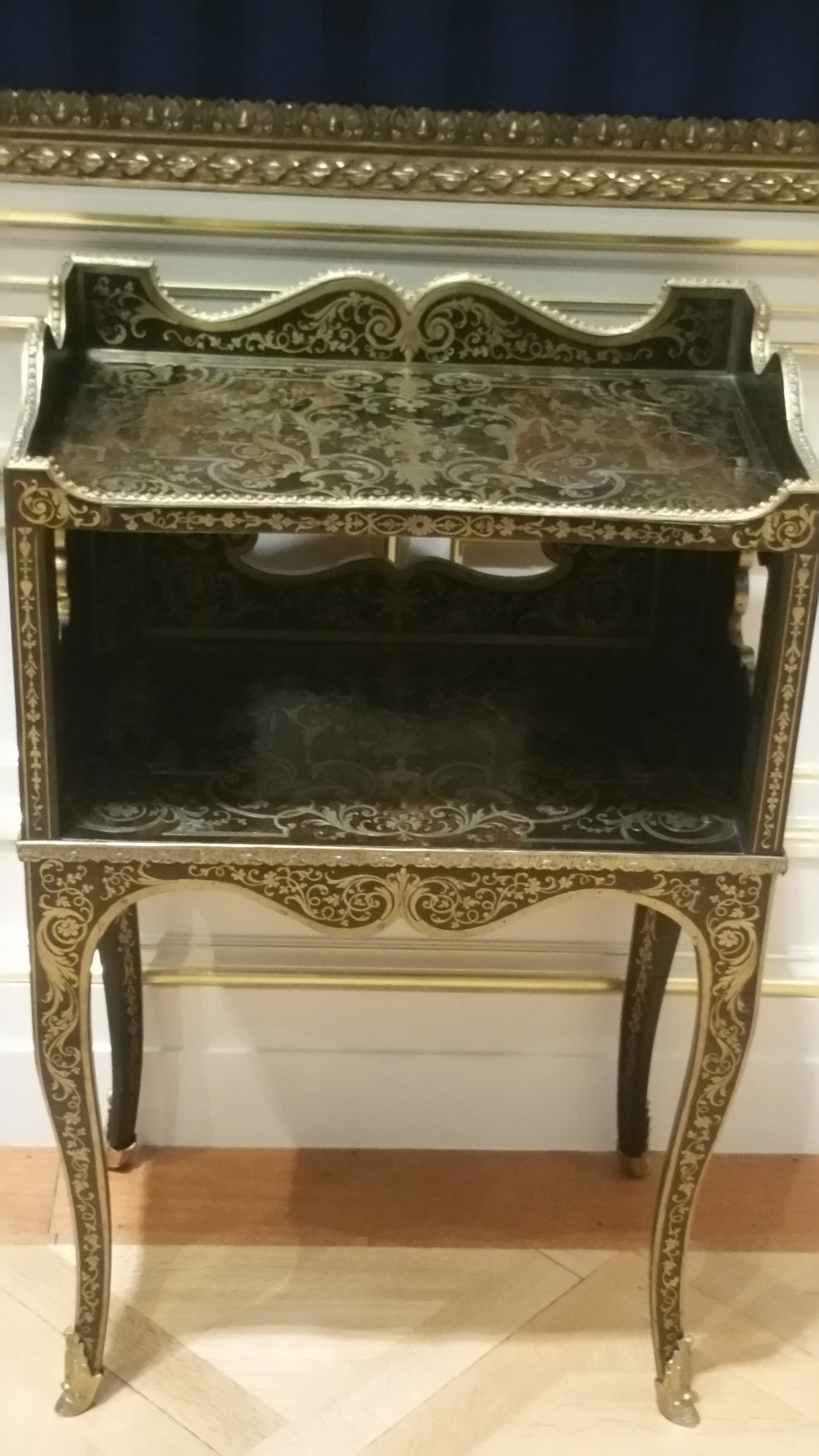

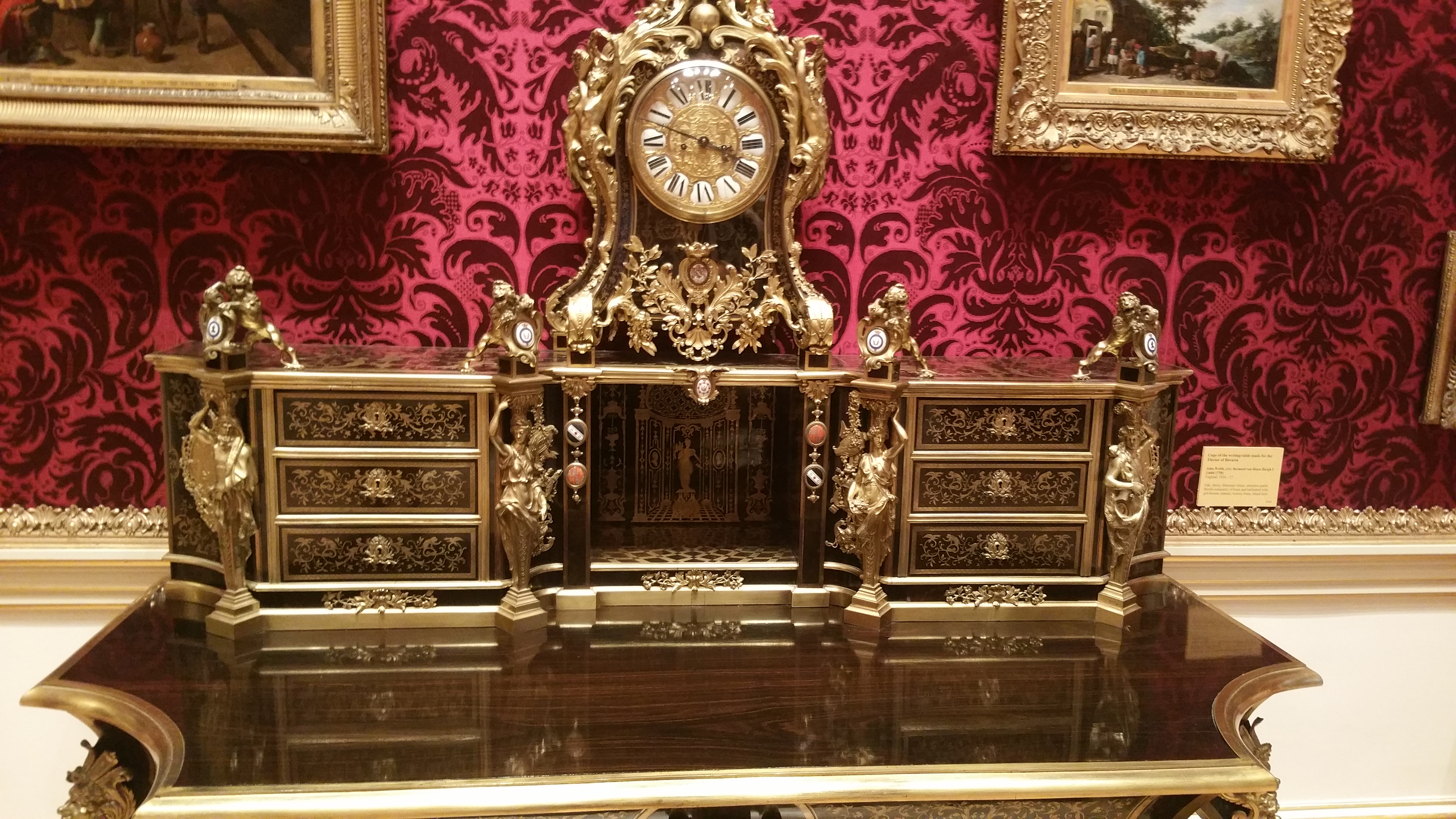

=== Art Institute of Chicago ===
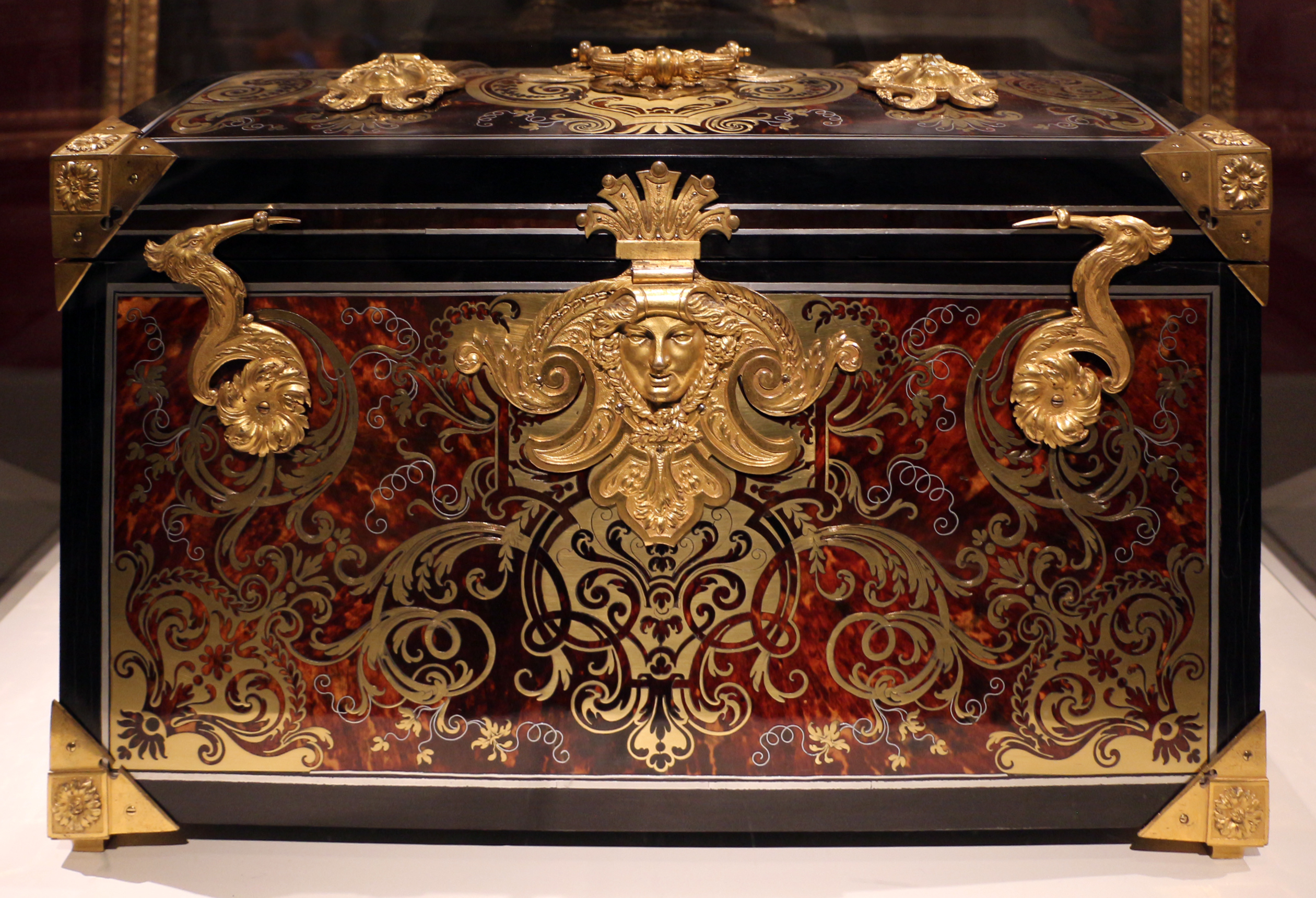
Casket, early 18th century, attributed to André-Charles Boulle, oak carcass veneered with tortoiseshell, gilt copper, pewter, ebony - Art Institute of Chicago

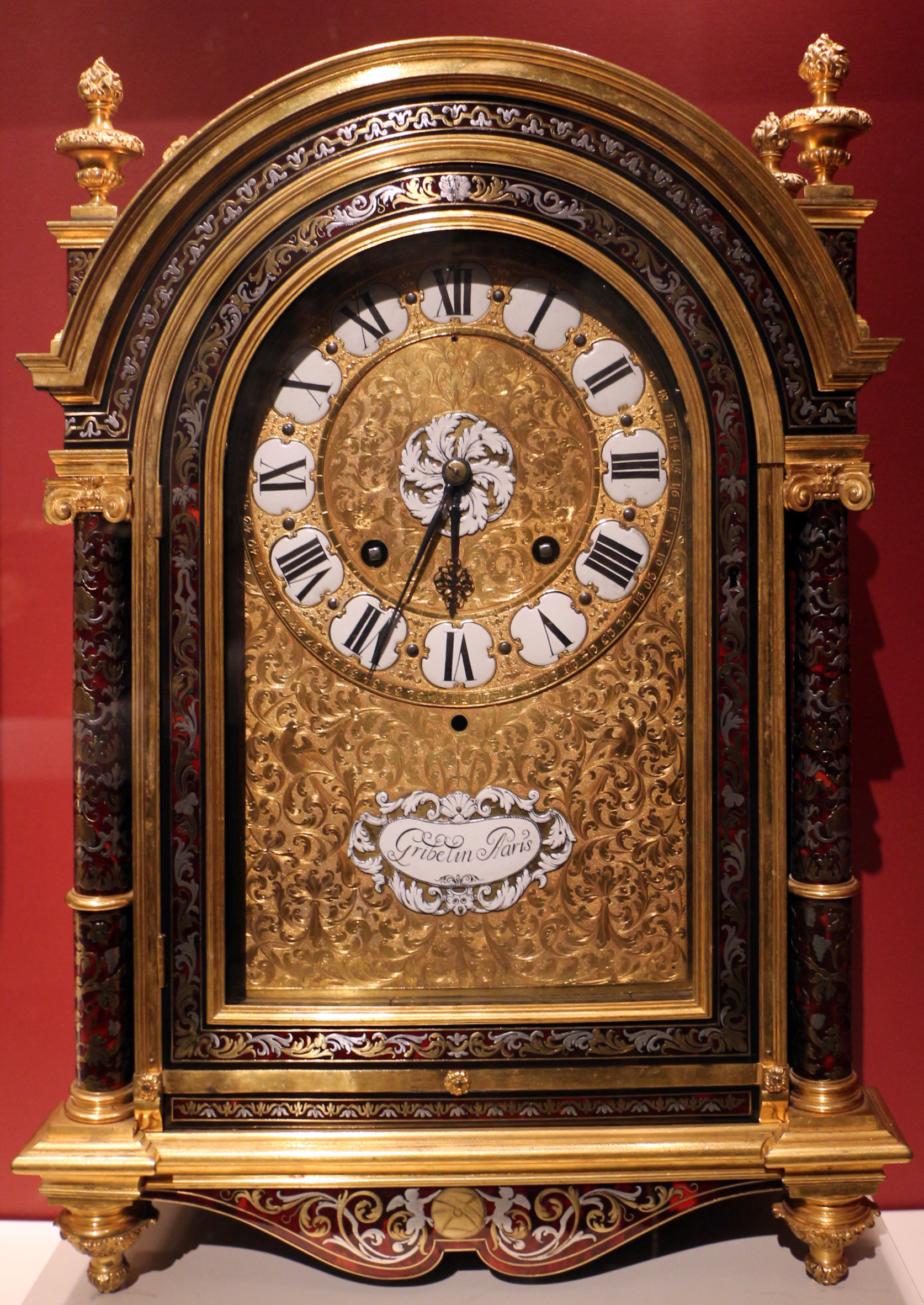
Table clock by André-Charles Boulle and Nicolas Gribelin, ca. 1675

=== Cleveland Museum of Art ===
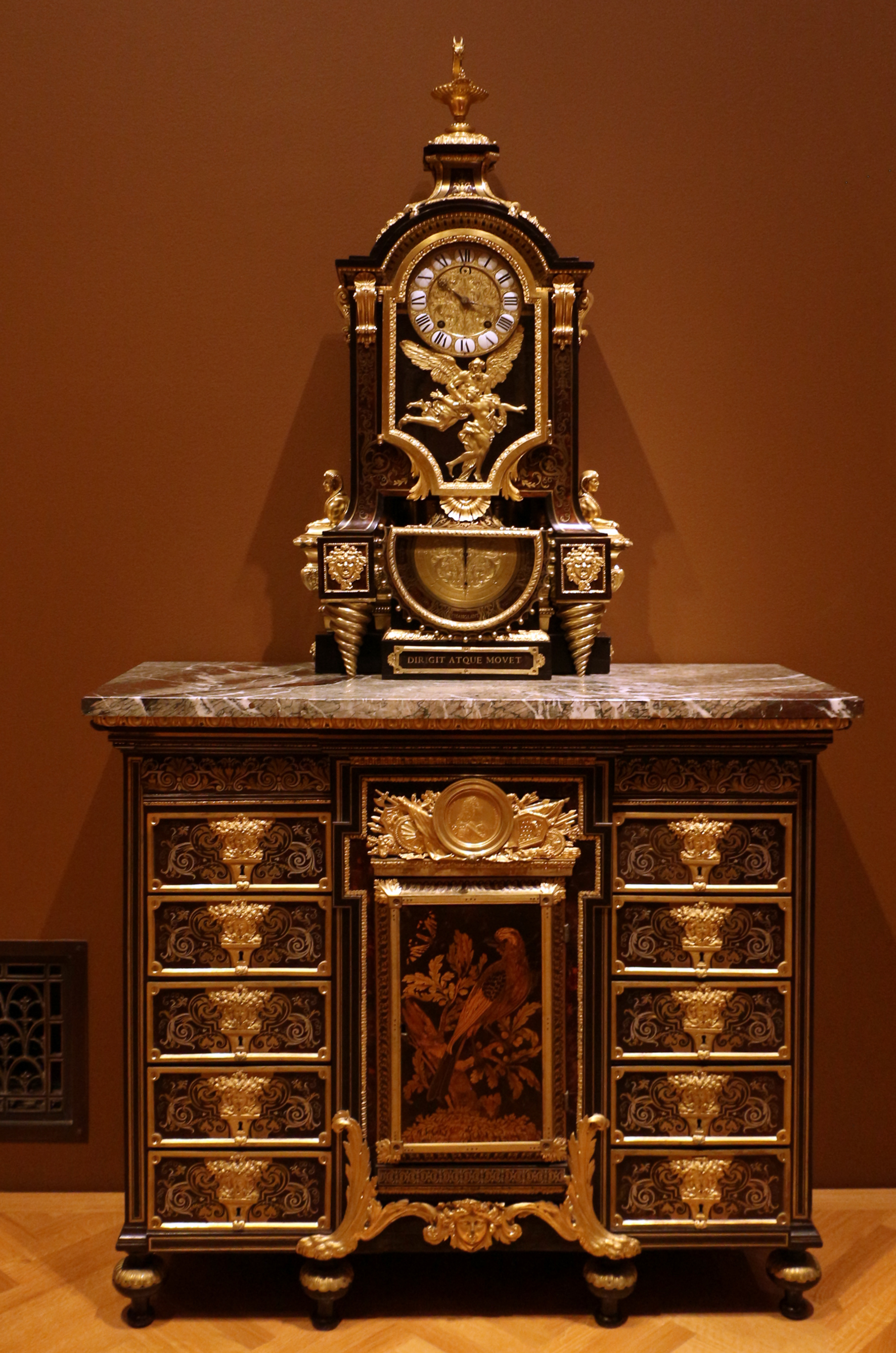
Cabinet, c. 1690, ebony, metal and tortoise shell, Cleveland Museum of Art

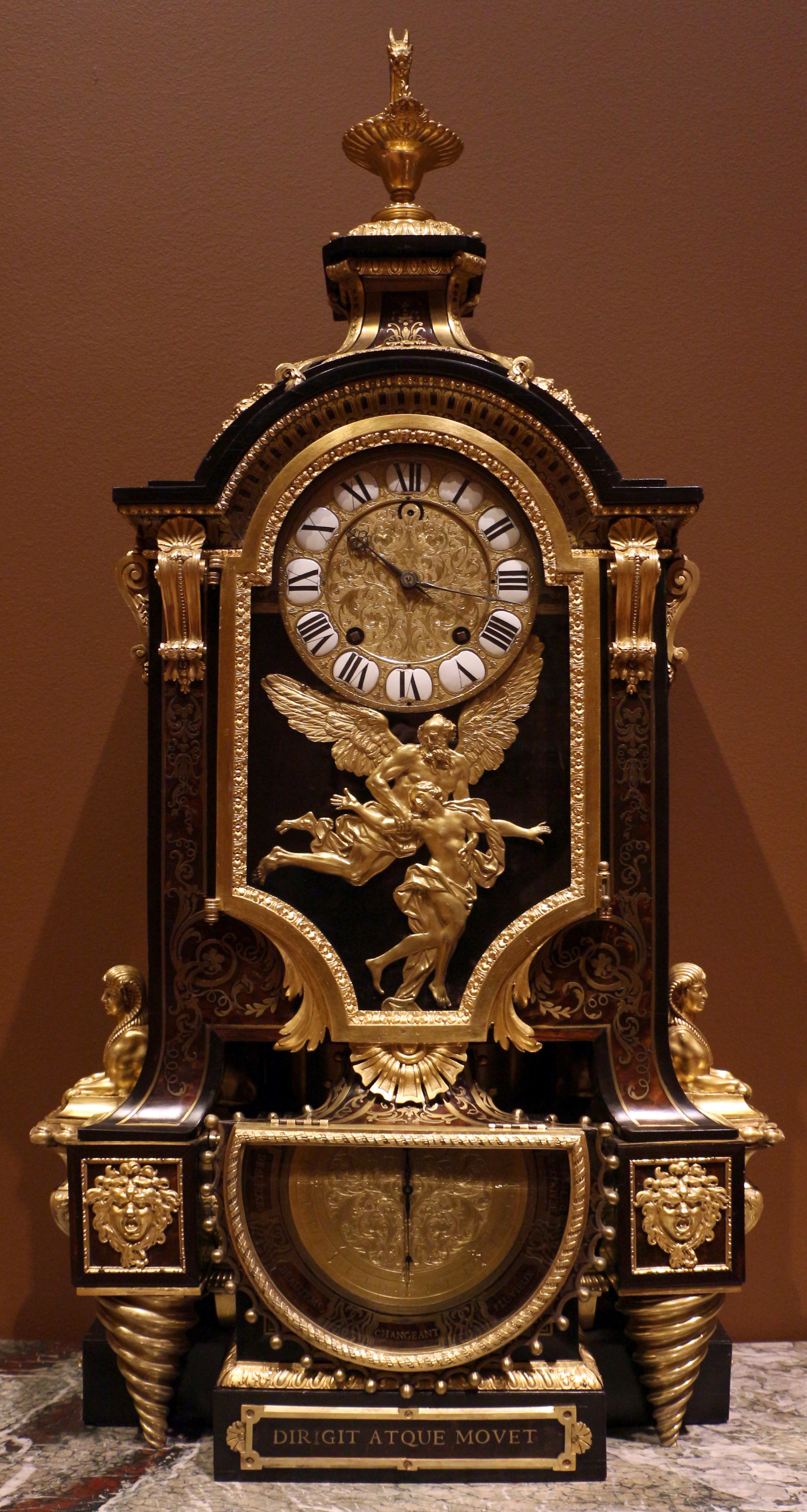
Clock, c. 1695, tortoise shell and
brass inlay, gilt bronze

=== Legion of Honor Museum ===
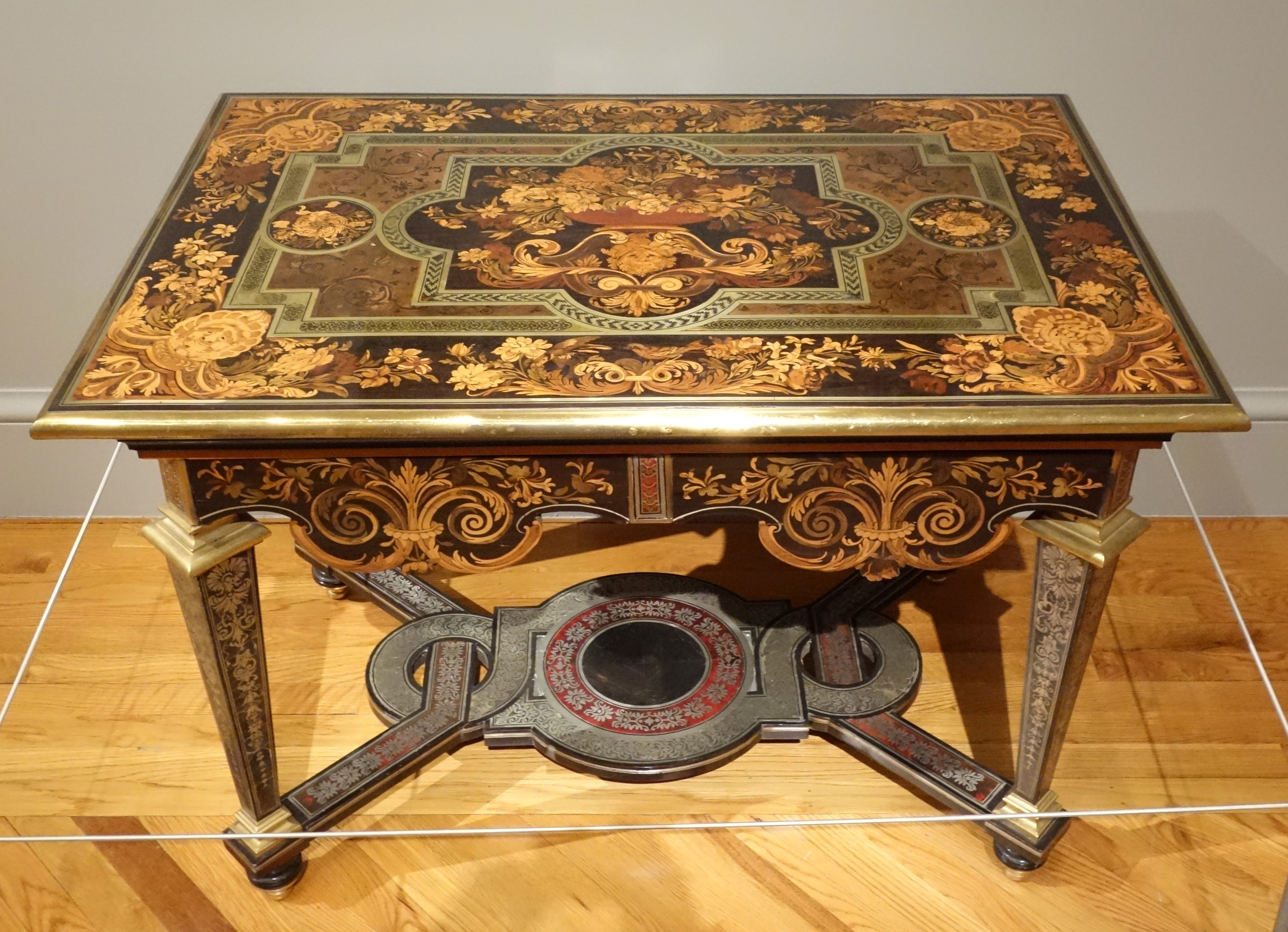
André-Charles Boulle at the Legion of Honor Museum, San Francisco

=== Calouste Gulbenkian Museum ===
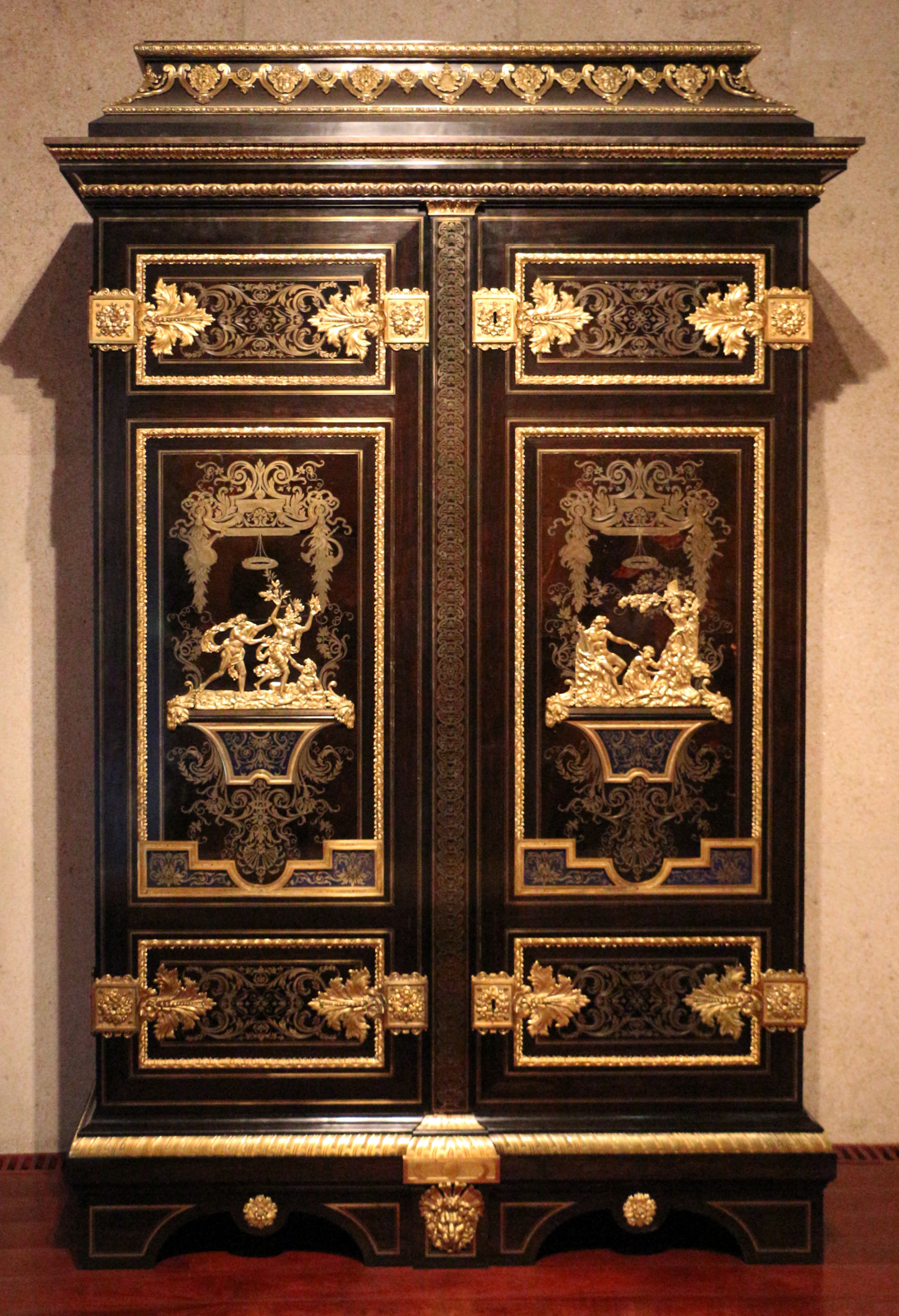
Armoire by André-Charles Boulle, Paris circa 1700

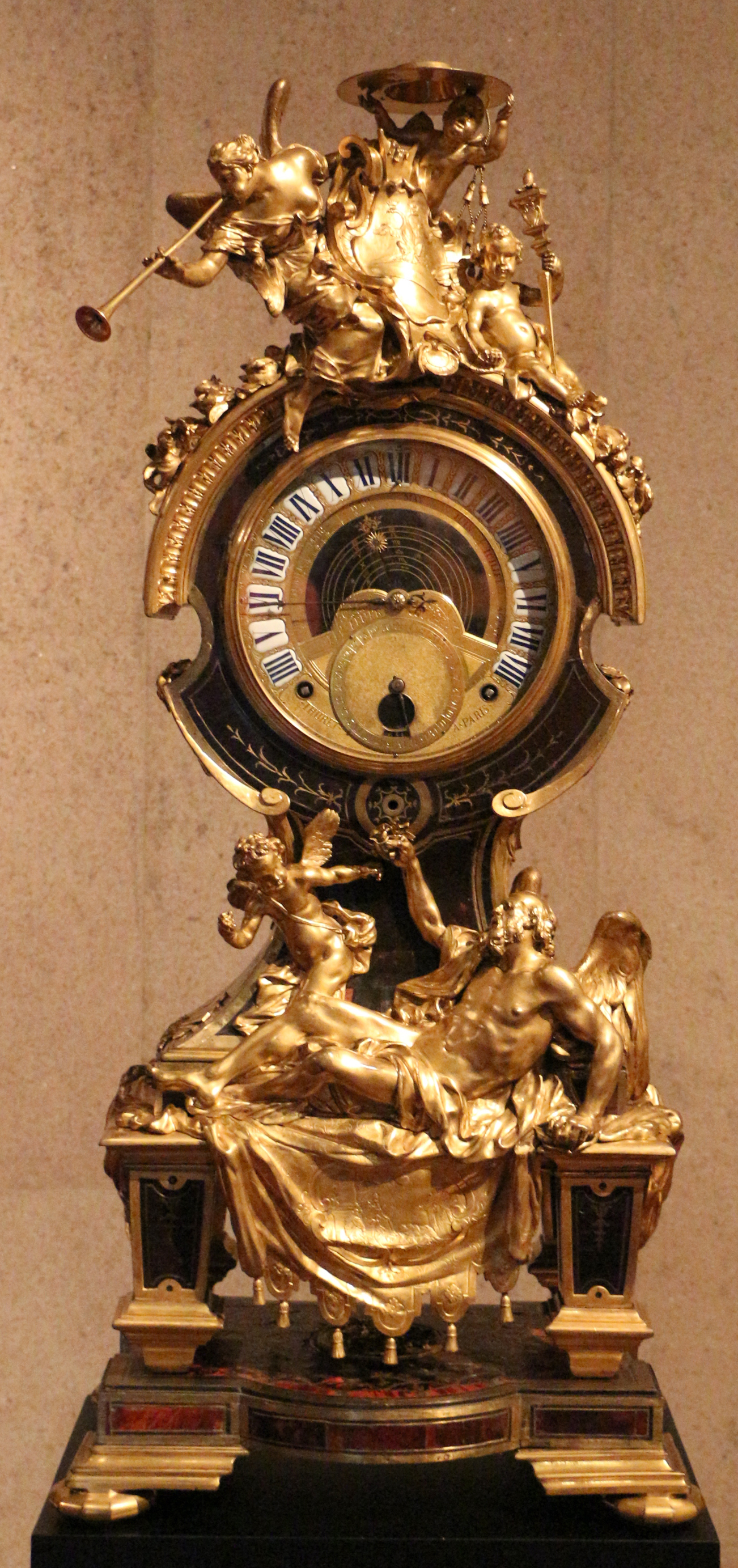
Astronomical clock by André-Charles Boulle and Jacques Thuret, Paris, 1712

=== Victoria and Albert Museum ===
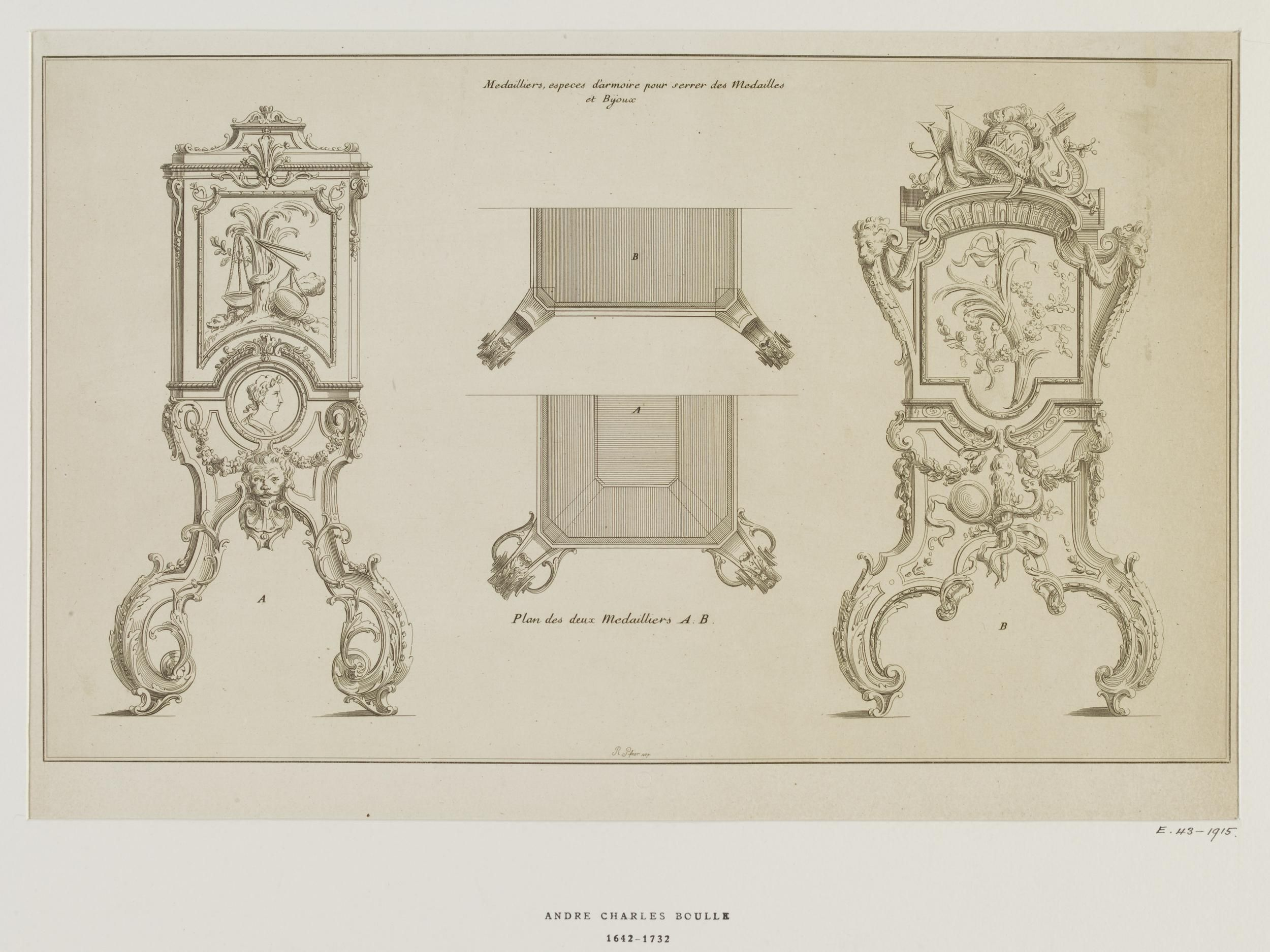
Victoria and Albert Museum. Design for a medal cabinet c.1720 "Plan des Deux Médaillers"

=== Paul Getty Museum ===
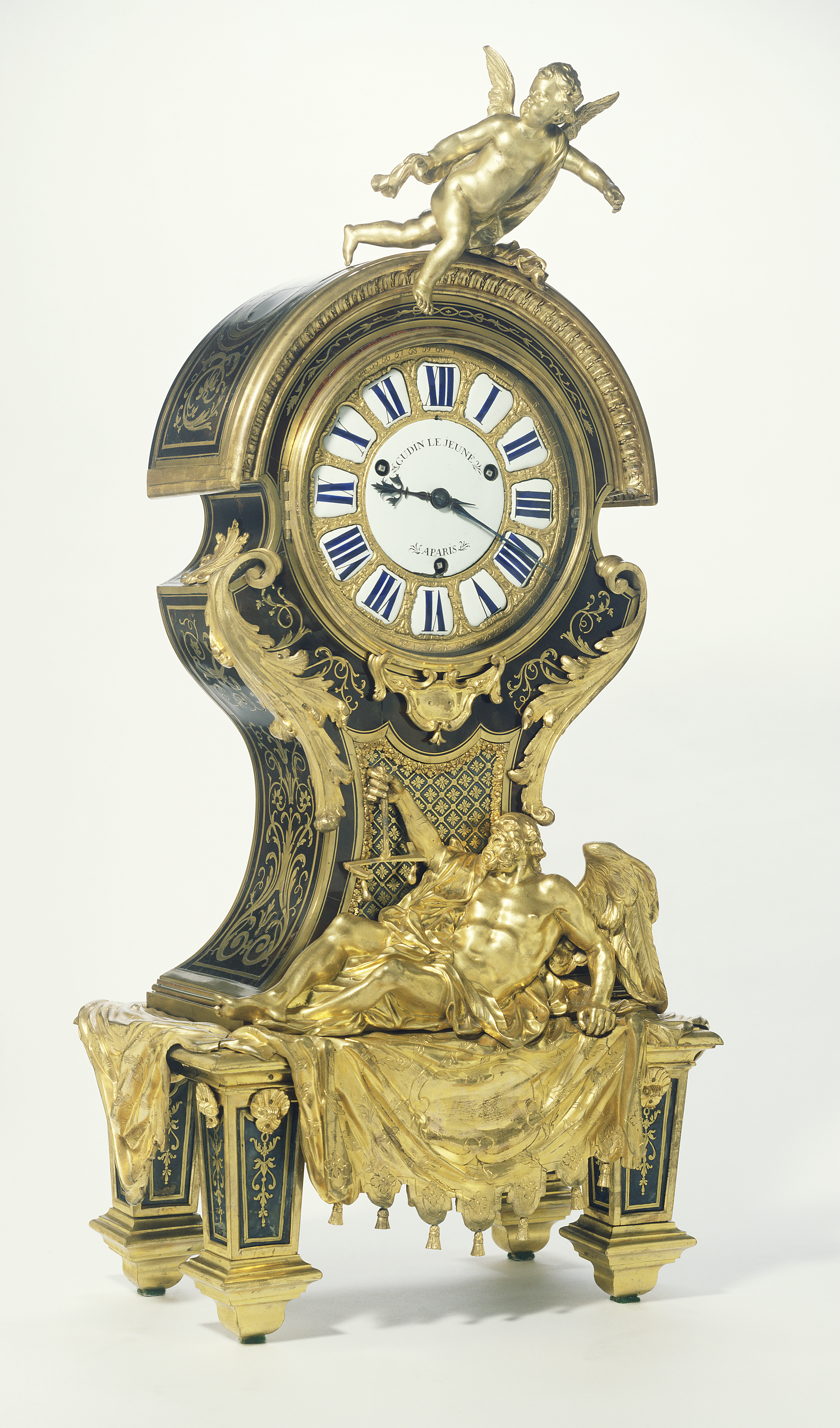
J. Paul Getty Museum : André-Charles Boulle, Mantel Clock (Pendule), 1715 to 1725, Oak veneered with tortoise shell, blue-painted horn, brass, and ebony; enameled metal; gilt bronze mounts

== Boulle in Châteaux ==
=== Château de Vaux Le-Vicomte ===
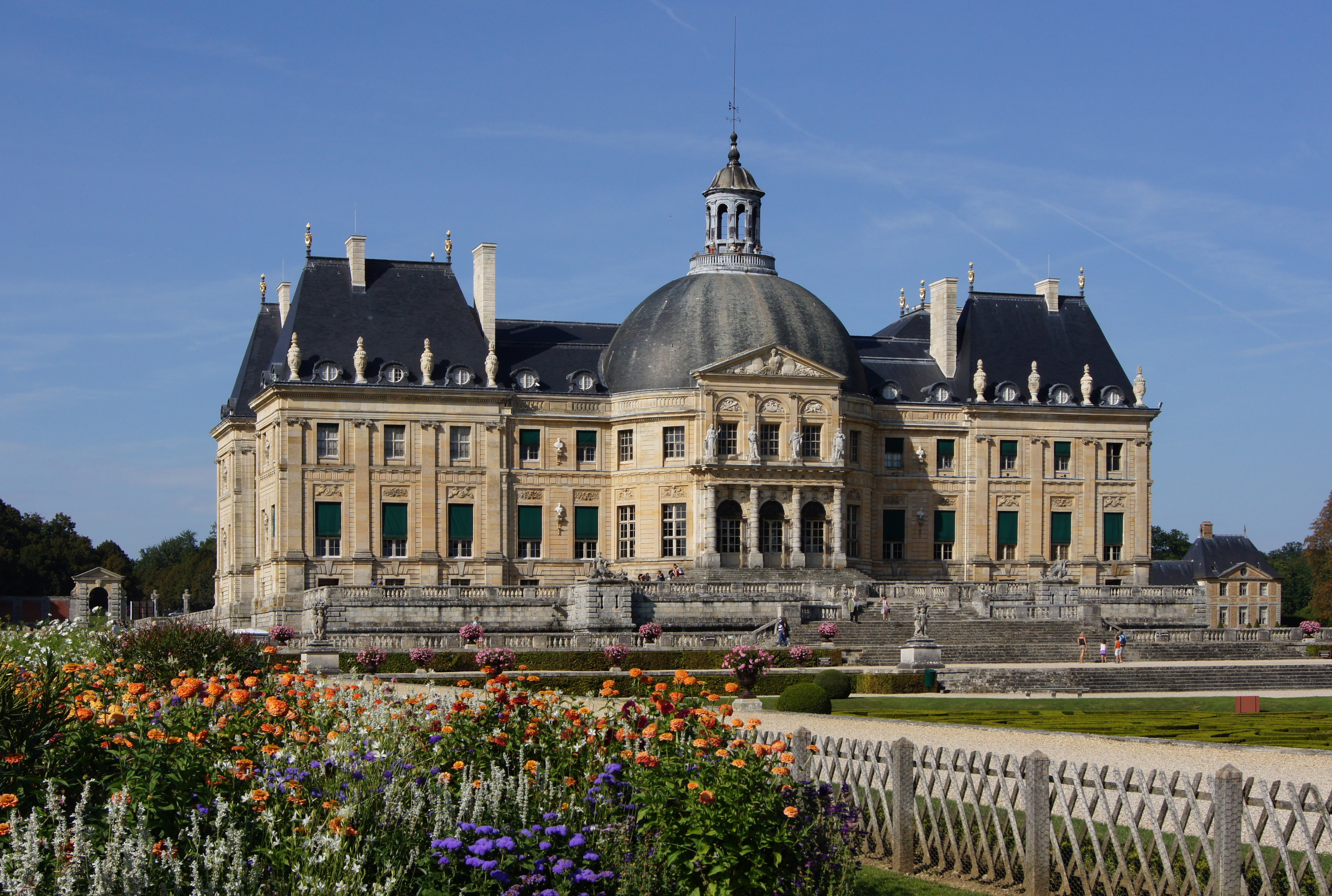
Château Vaux le Vicomte

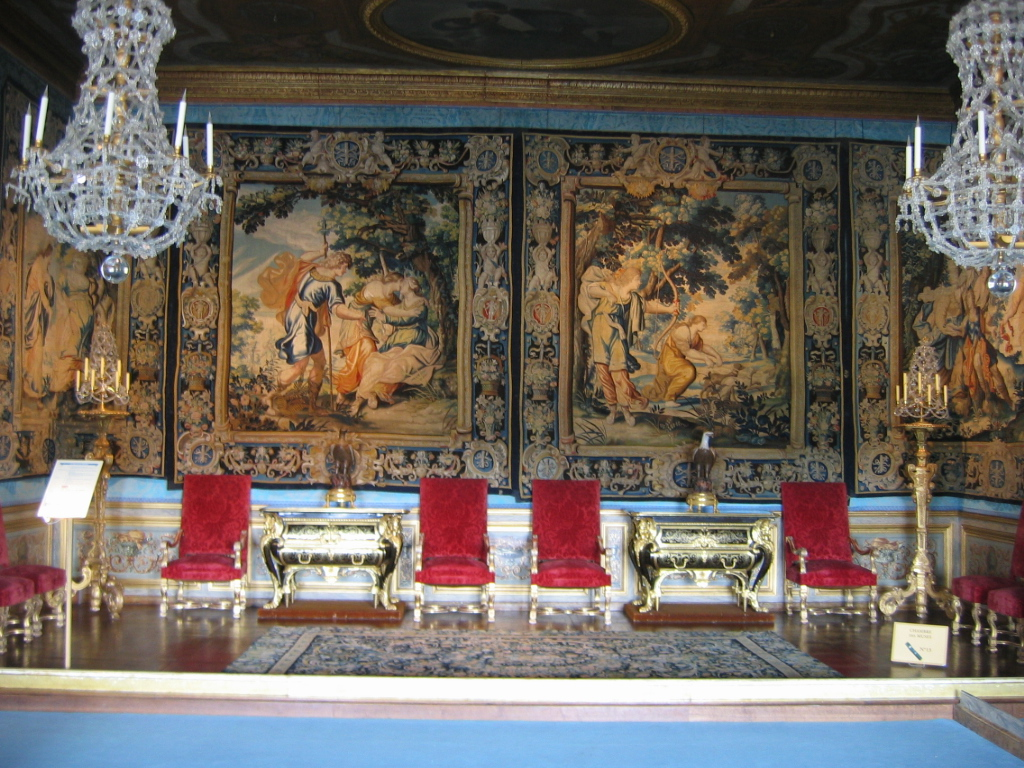
Chambre des Muses

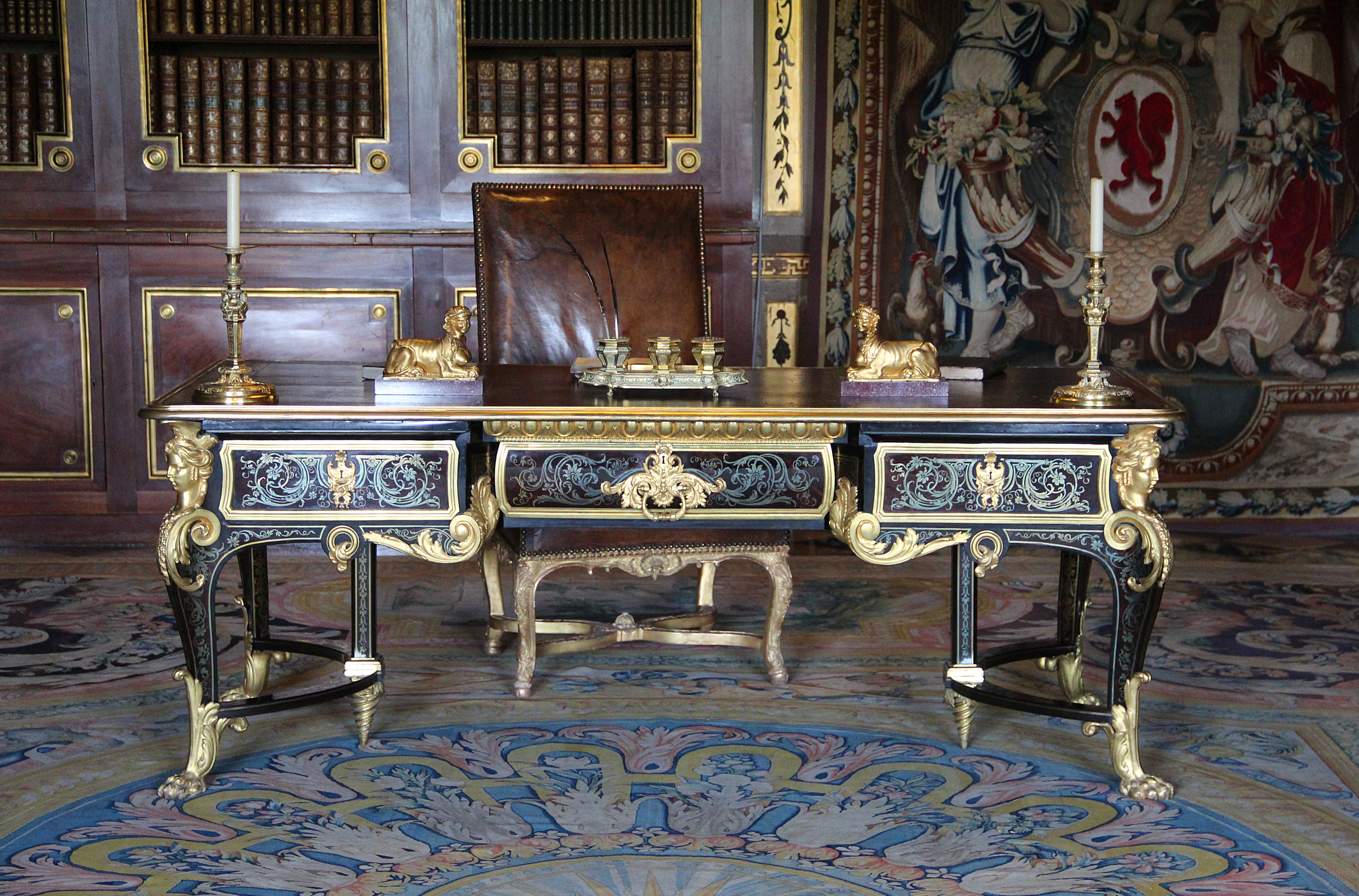
Grand Bureau de Nicolas Fouquet

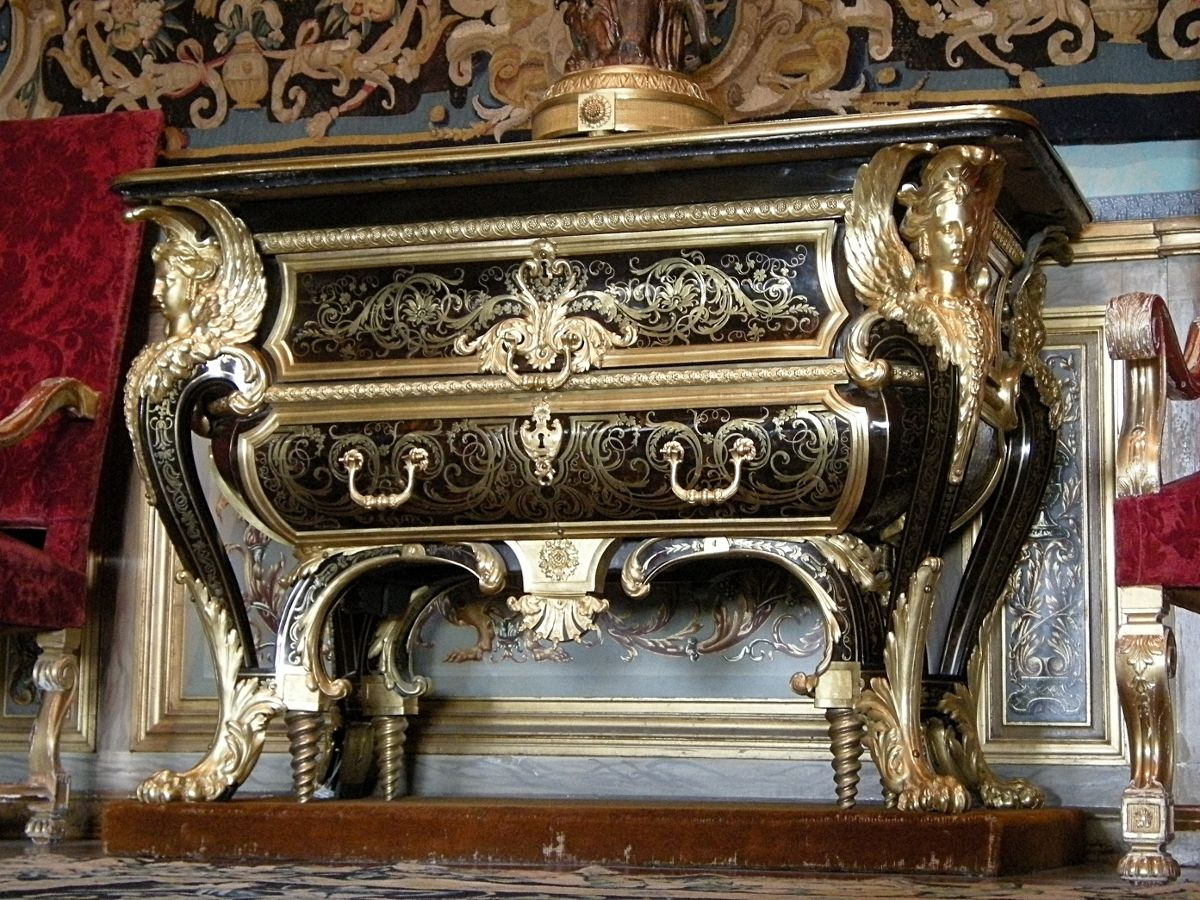
Commode "Mazarine"

=== Château de Versailles ===
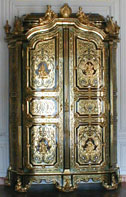
Armoire

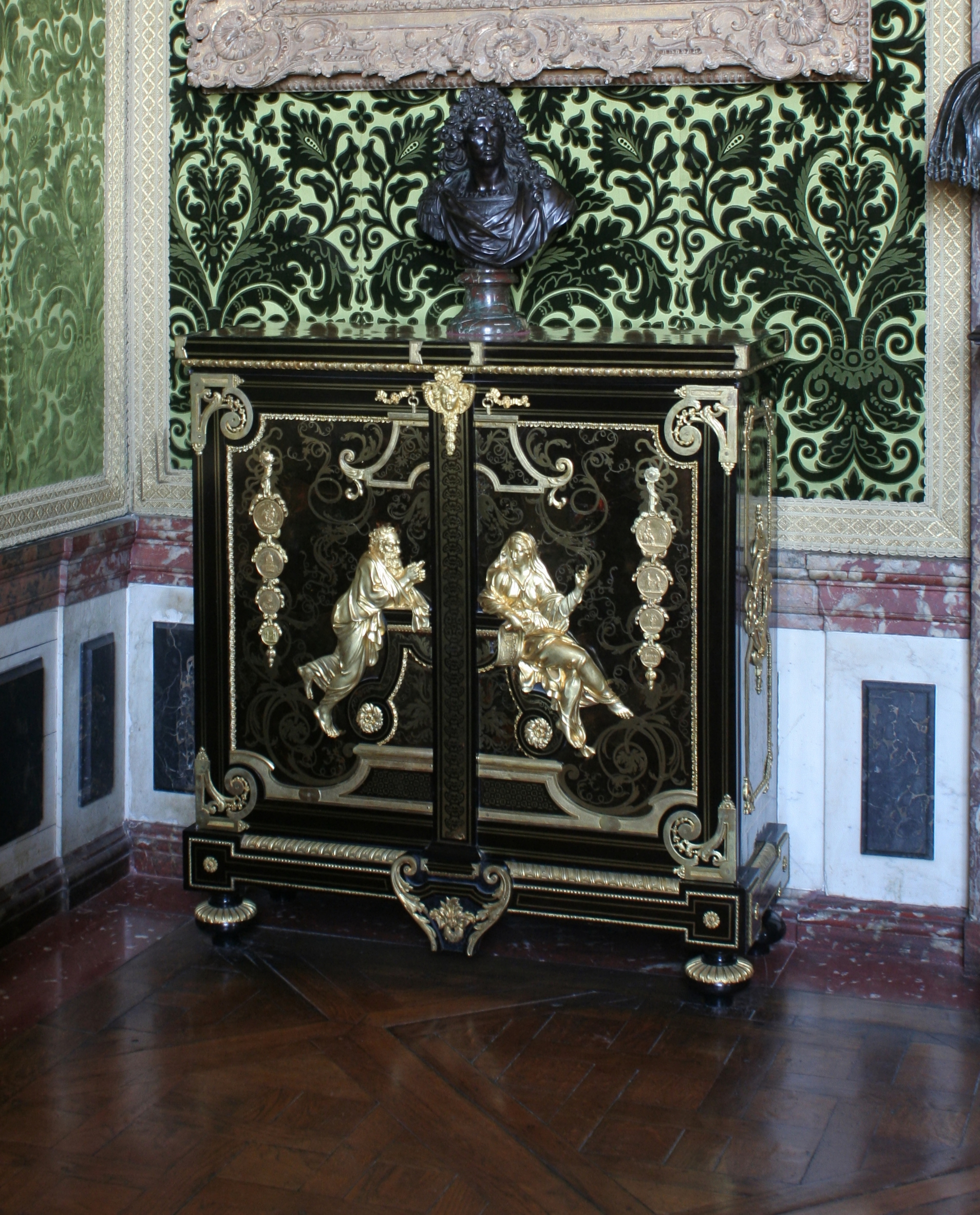
Medal Chest

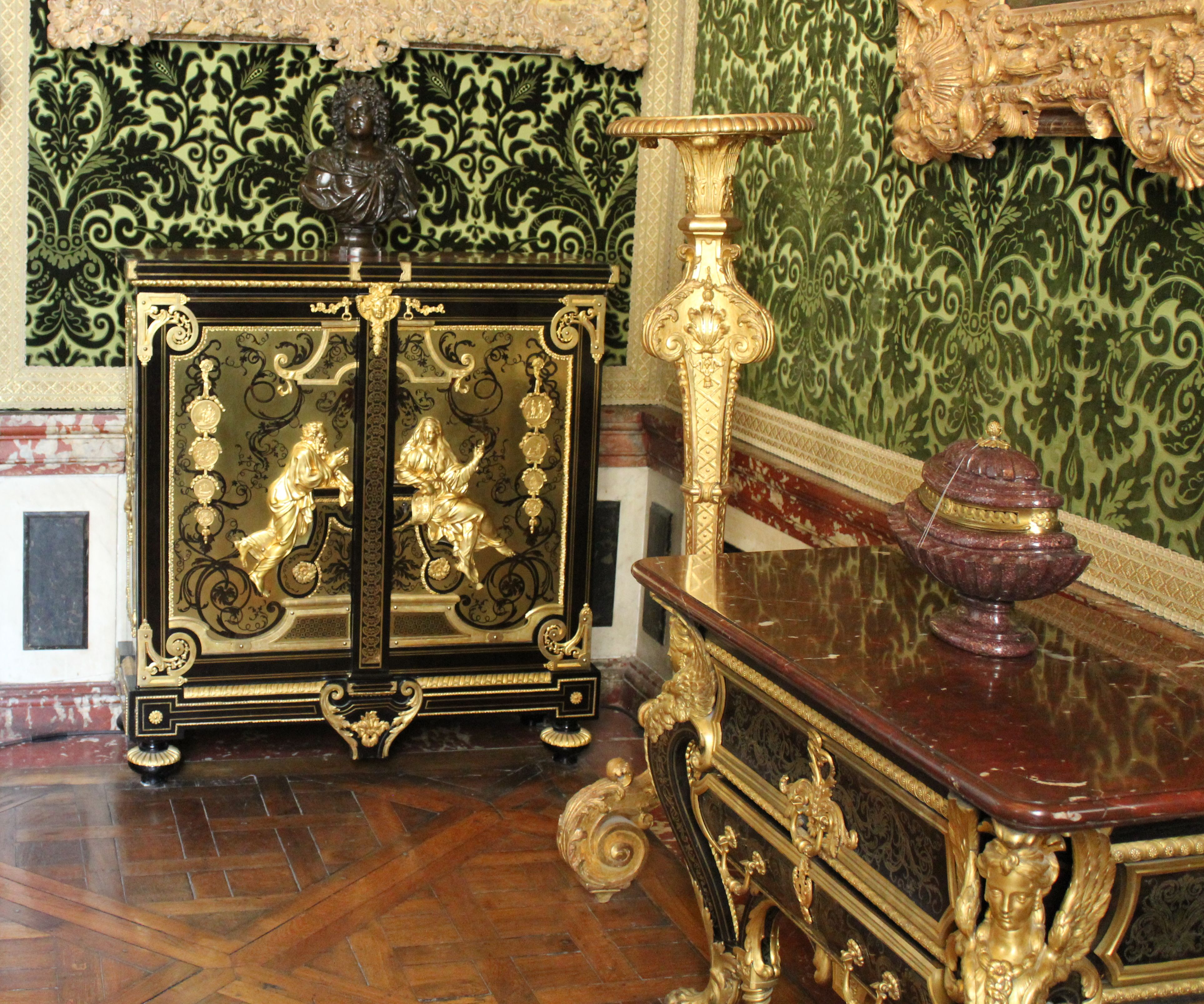
Medal Chest and Commode

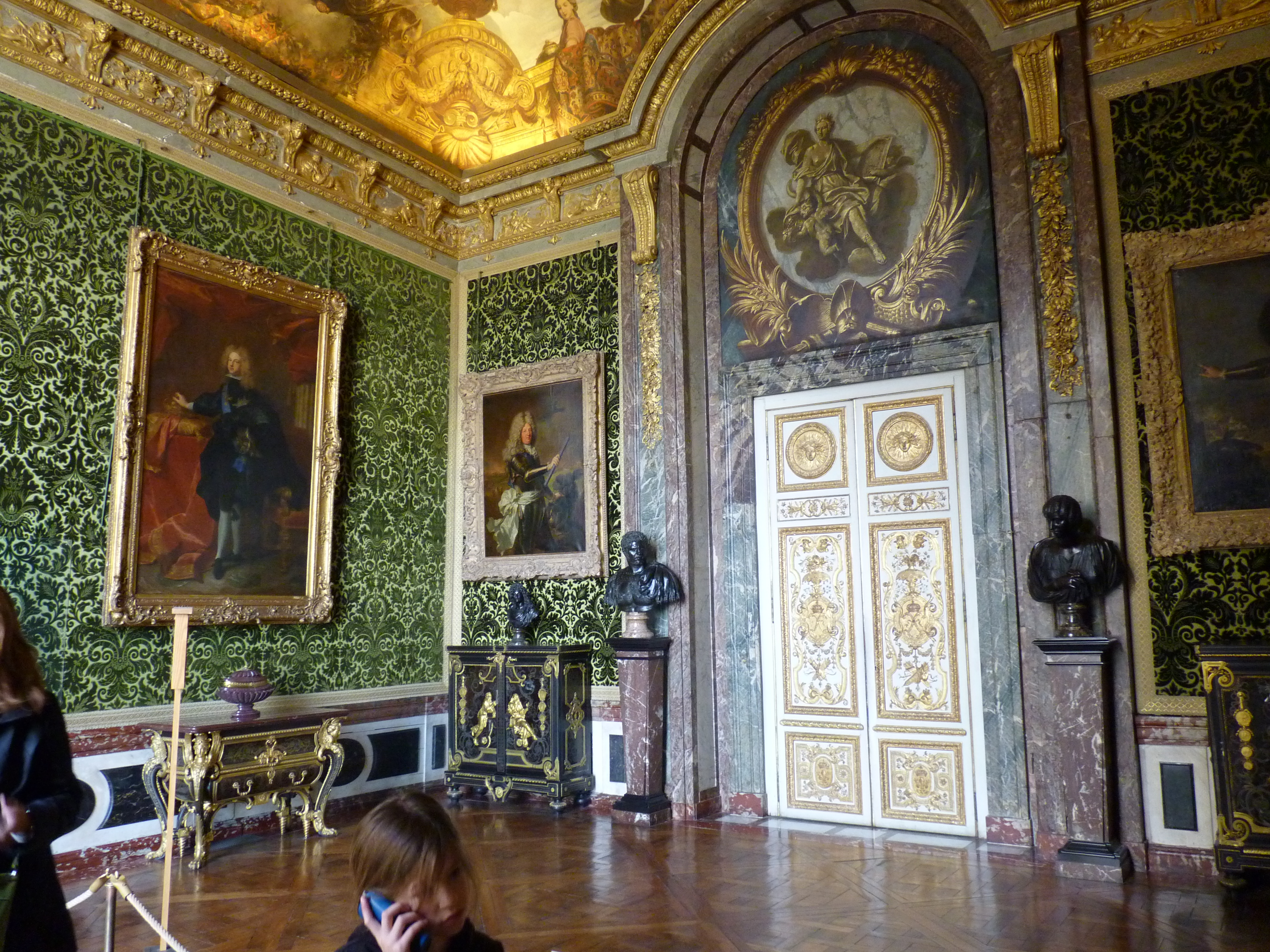
Salon de L'Abondance

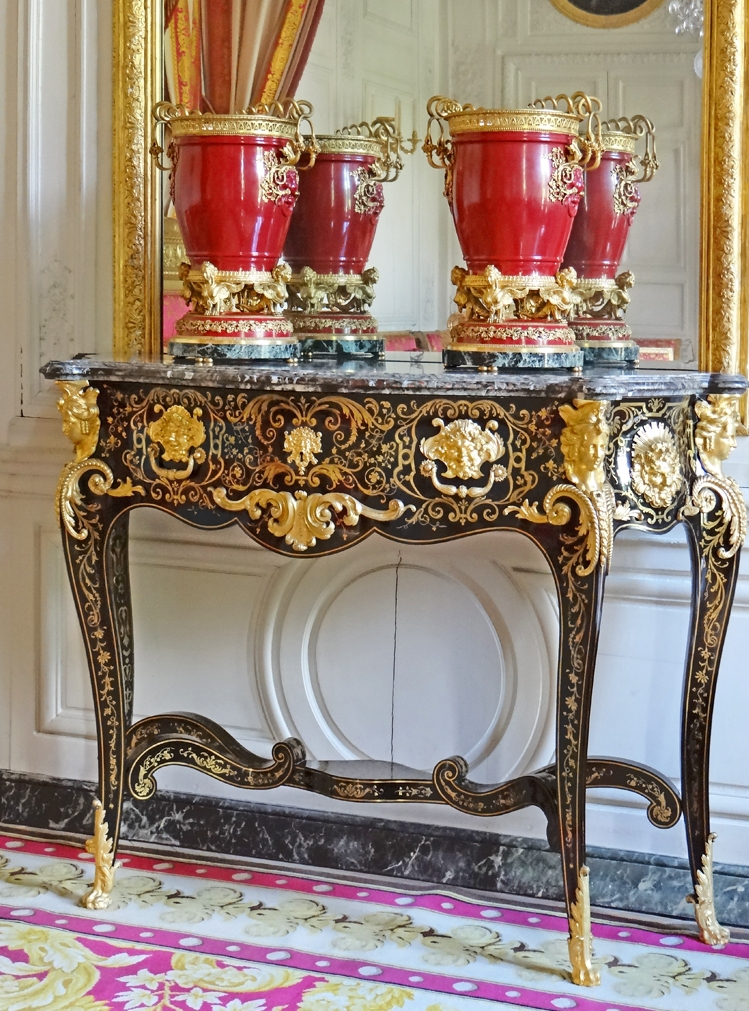
1867 Boulle work

=== Grand Trianon ===
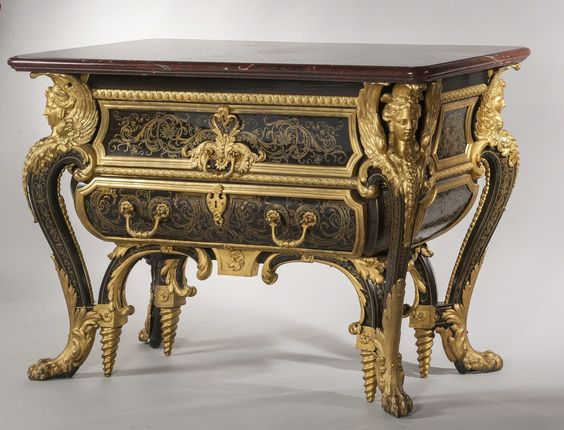
André-Charles Boulle, Commode Mazarin (Mazarin Cabinet), 1708, made for the Grand Trianon

Boulle delivered the prototypes for the Mazarin Commode to the Grand Trianon in 1708. Louis Antoine de Pardaillan de Gondrin Director of the King's buildings, wrote to Louis XIV: "I was at the Trianon inspecting the second writing desk by Boulle; it is as beautiful as the other and suits the room perfectly." The design proved to be popular, although criticized for being awkward meaning, particularly because four extra spiral legs that were required to support the weight of the bronze and marble. At least five other examples were made by Boulle's workshop, dated between 1710 and 1732, including one now in the Metropolitan Museum of Art.

=== Château de Chantilly ===
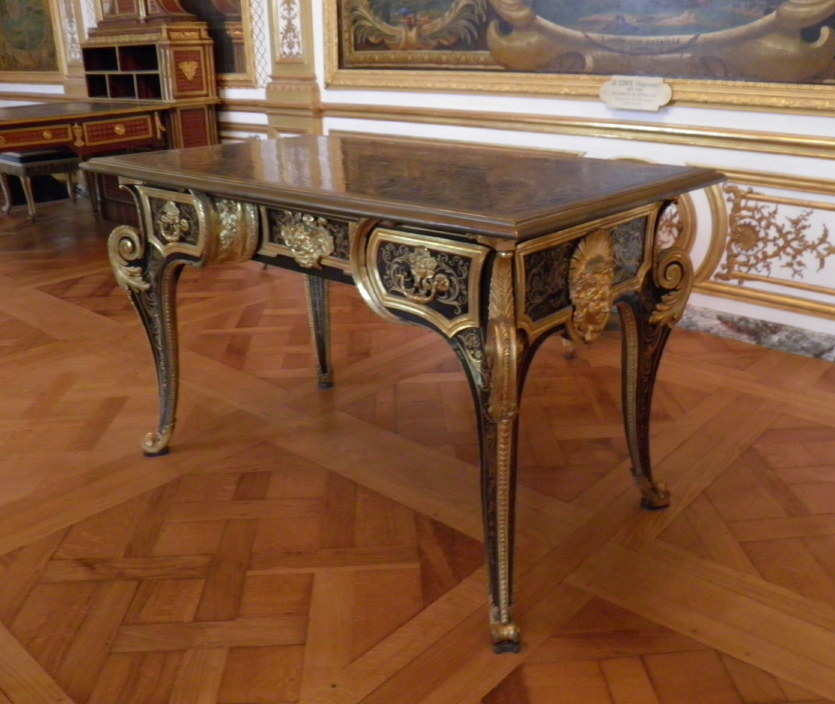
Table

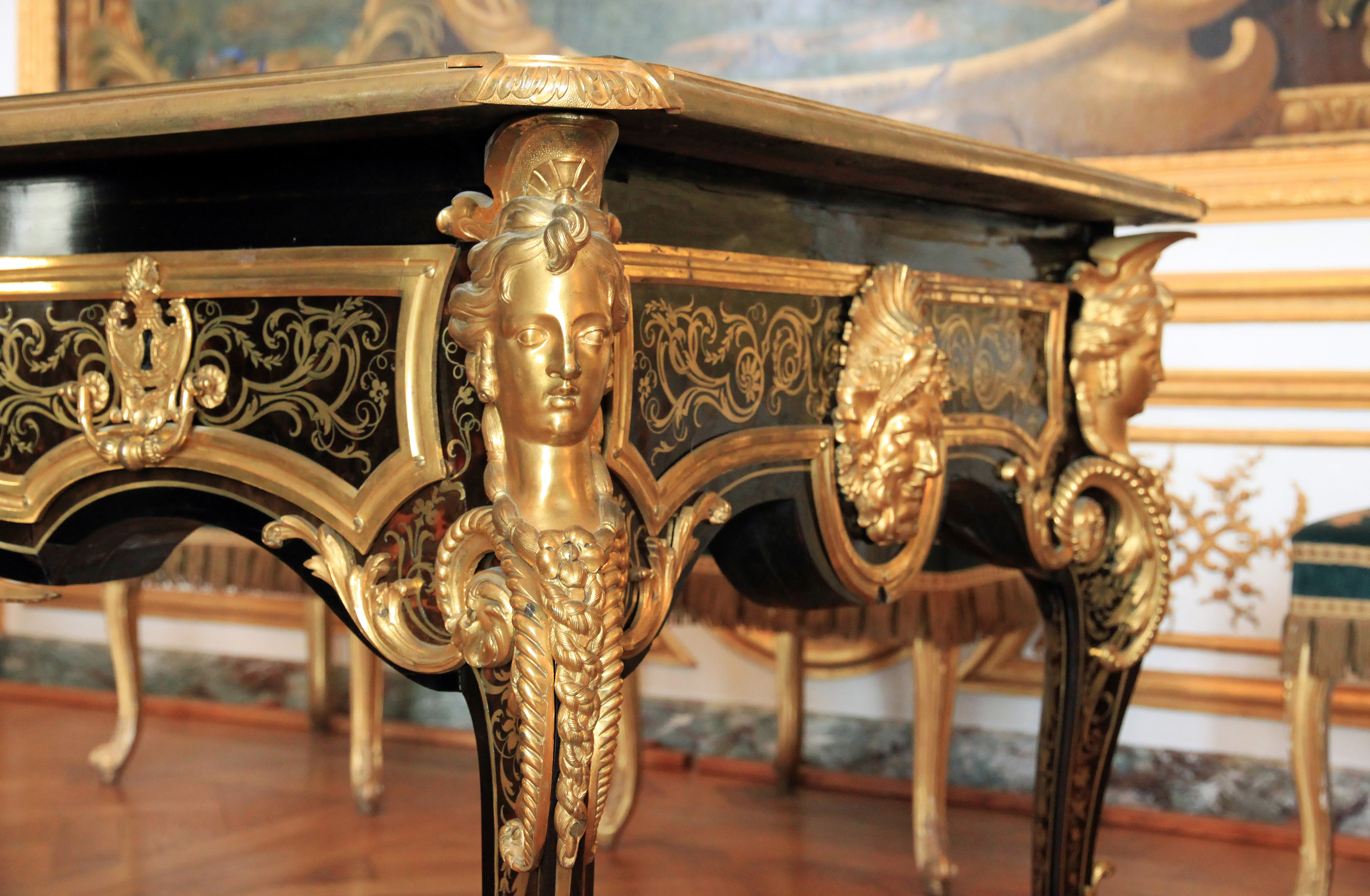
Bureau

=== Waddesdon Manor ===
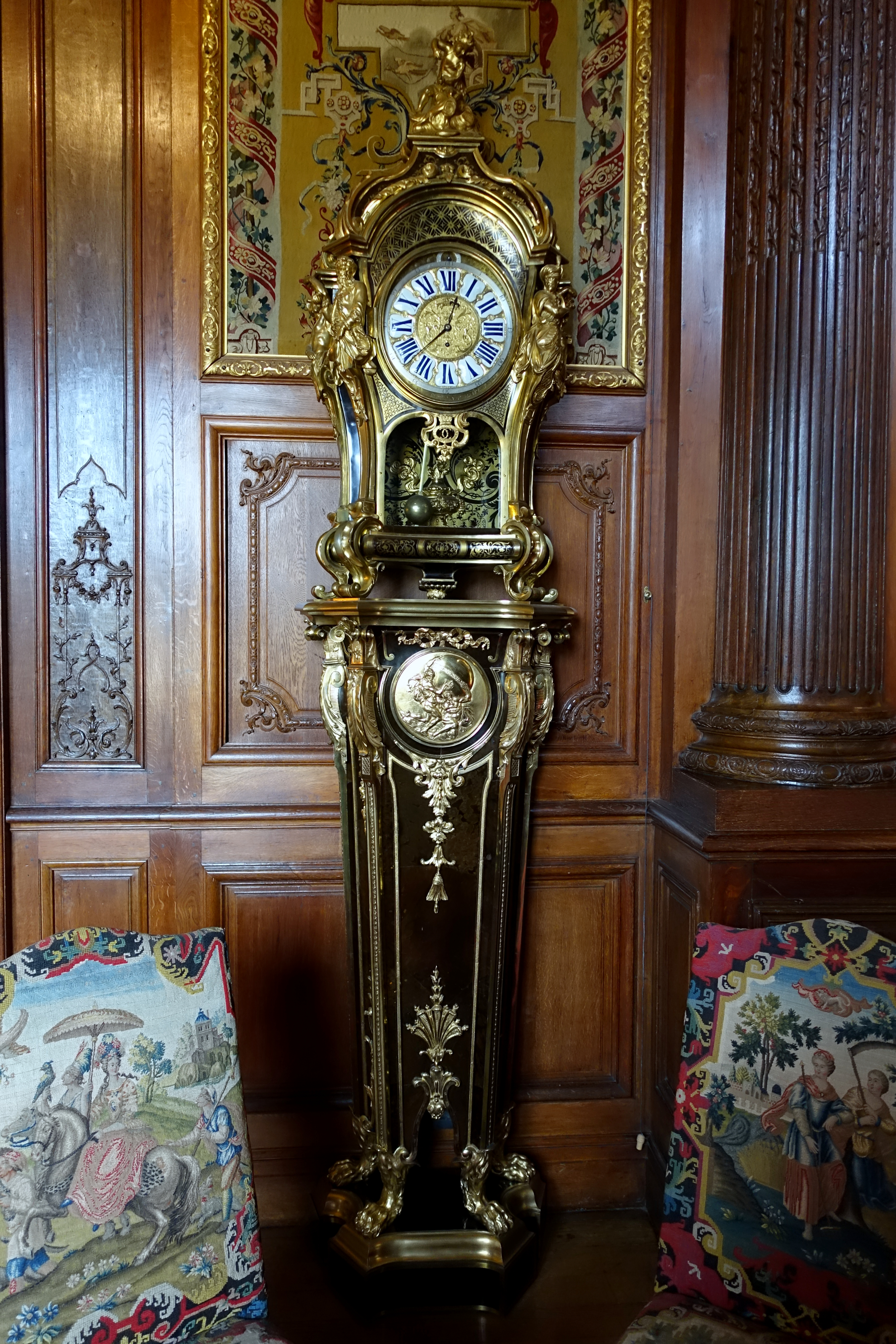
Pedestal clock by André-Charles Boulle, movement by George Graham, 1720–1725. Waddesdon Manor, Buckinghamshire, England

=== Royal Collection & Windsor Castle ===
Most of the furniture in the British Royal Collection made by, or attributed to, Boulle was acquired by George IV (1762–1830). A Francophile, the King furnished the royal palaces with large quantities of fashionable French furniture from the 1780s until his death in 1830. The lavish style and use of exotic materials accorded well with his extravagant taste. However, due to the volume of eighteenth- and nineteenth-century imitations, as well as the fact that Boulle did not sign his work, it can be difficult to definitively credit pieces to the maker. For this reason, many of the Boulle-marquetry pieces in the Royal Collection are recorded as 'attributed to André-Charles Boulle'. There are at least 13 works of art by André-Charles Boulle in the Royal Collection, including (i)Armoire, c. 1700 (The Grand Corridor, Windsor Castle) (ii) Cabinet (en première-partie), c. 1700 (The Grand Corridor, Windsor Castle) (iii) Cabinet (en contre-partie), c. 1700 (The Grand Corridor, Windsor Castle) (iv)Cabinet, (without stand, similar to ones in the State Hermitage Museum and the collections of the Duke of Buccleuch) (v) Paire de bas d'armoire, (The Grand Corridor, Windsor Castle) (vi) Writing table, possibly delivered to Louis, Grand Dauphin (1661–1711), c. 1680 (vii) Paire de torchère, c. 1700 (viii) Bureau Plat, c. 1710 (The Rubens Room, Windsor Castle) (ix) Petit gaines, attributed to., early 18th century. (Source: Royal Collection)

== See also ==
- Barometer Clock (Boulle)

== Bibliography ==
- P. Fuhring, "Designs for and after Boulle furniture", in The Burlington Magazine, June 1992, pp. 350–62;
- P. Hughes, The Wallace Collection Catalogue of Furniture, vol. II, London, 1996;
- A. Pradère, Les ebenistes Français de Louis XIV à la révolution, Paris, 1989;
- J-R. Ronfort (ed.), André Charles Boulle : Un nouveau style pour l'Europe, exh. cat., Paris, 2009;
- J-P. Samoyault, André Charles Boulle et sa famille, Paris, 1979.
- The Boulle Archives, Centre de Recherches Historiques, 92, rue La Fayette, 75009 Paris
