= Louis XIV furniture =

Furniture of Louis XIV of France

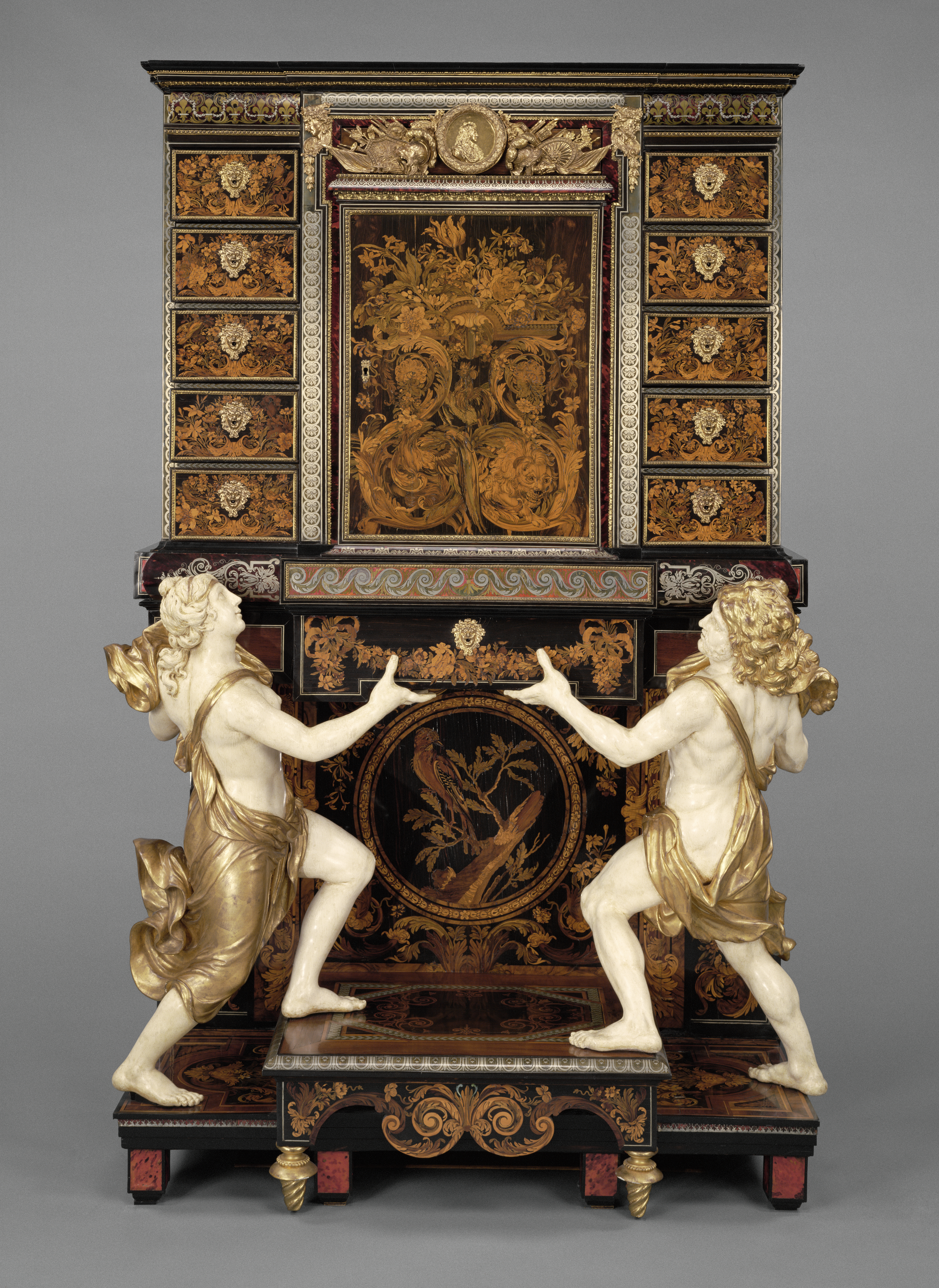
Cabinet on a stand by André-Charles Boulle (1675–80). Oak veneered with pewter, brass, tortoise shell, horn, ebony, ivory, and wood marquetry; bronze mounts; figures of painted and gilded oak; drawers of snakewood (J. Paul Getty Museum, Los Angeles)

The furniture of Louis XIV was massive and lavishly covered with sculpture and ornament of gilded bronze in the earlier part of the personal rule of King Louis XIV of France (1660–1690). After about 1690, thanks in large part to the furniture designer André Charles Boulle, a more original and delicate style appeared, sometimes known as Boulle work. It was based on the use of marquetry, the inlay of pieces of ebony and other rare woods, a technique first used in Florence in the 15th century, which was refined and developed by Boulle and others working for the King. Furniture was inlaid with thin plaques of ebony, copper, mother of pearl, and exotic woods of different colors in elaborate designs.

New and often enduring types of furniture appeared; the commode, with two to four drawers, replaced the old coffre, or chest. The canapé, or sofa, appeared, in the form of a combination of two or three armchairs. New kinds of armchairs appeared, including the fauteuil en confessionale or "Confessional armchair", which had padded cushions on either side of the back of the chair. The console table also made its first appearance; it was designed to be placed against a wall. Another new type of furniture was the table à gibier, a marble-topped table for holding dishes. Early varieties of the desk appeared; the Mazarin desk had a central section set back, placed between two columns of drawers, with four feet on each column.

== History ==
In the period of Louis XIV's youth (1643–1660), when France was effectively run by his mother, Anne of Austria, the furniture style was that of his father, Louis XIII, mixed with the Italian influence brought by Cardinal Mazarin. Rooms were dominated by massive cabinets, decorated with columns, frontons, pilasters, balustrades, niches and other decoration which matched the elaborate carved wood paneling, called lambris, placed as squares or rectangles on the walls, and the sculpted ceilings with similar decorations. Cabinets, tables and chairs were geometric. Armchairs appeared with high backs, made with pieces of bois tourné, cut in a spiral form.

The second period, from 1660 to about 1690, was the beginning of the personal reign of Louis XIV; much of the furniture of this period was made for the decoration of the grand new halls of the Palace of Versailles designed by Louis Le Vau and then by Jules Hardouin-Mansart. The characteristics of the first style in decoration and furniture were richness of materials and an effort to achieve a monumental effect. Decorative elements on the walls and furniture were often military; helmets, crossed weapons, oak leave clusters symbolizing victory, sculpted, gilded, and placed on the walls. Other common decorations were masks of Apollo (the Sun God symbolized Louis, the "Sun King"); the eagle of Jupiter, the lion, the rooster, and a wide variety of crowns, scepters and royal batons.

The Royal furniture manufactory was established in 1667, part of the royal art establishment which included the Academy of Fine Arts and the royal tapestry manufactory at Sèvres. Its designers and craftsmen created most of the new furniture made for the Palace of Versailles and other royal residences.

In the final period, from about 1690 onwards, under the influence of Haroudin-Mansart, Pierre Lapautre and other designers, the style of decor and furniture became less grandiose and more elegant; marble on walls was replaced by wood paneling in light colors, or natural wood that was waxed or varnished. As heating systems improved, fireplaces became smaller; as glass technology improved, mirrors became larger, and could cover entire walls, as they soon did at Versailles. New and lighter decorative themes appeared that were often exotic and playful, notably putti or cherubs, and grotesques, arabesques and lace-like dentelle designs.

The style of the last period was strongly influenced by the marquetry of the ebeniste André-Charles Boulle, who between 1675–80 greatly refined the classic techniques of applying thin plaques of ebony, exotic woods, copper, tortoise shell, and mother-of-pearl. Sometimes copper decoration was placed on a background of tortoise shell, and sometimes the tortoise shell design was on a background of copper. The decor became more and more elaborate, fanciful and exotic, particularly in the work of another influential designer, Jean Bérain the Elder. Another popular decoration on furniture was bronze ornament, sculpted and gilded. Reliefs of gilded bronze covered the faces of the pieces of furniture, decorating the keyholes and the angles. The corners of commodes were occupied by sculptures of women or angels, and the feet were dressed in gilded bronze shoes or sculpted lions' or deer feet.

In the later style, the geometric forms were gradually replaced by curving lines, and an assortment of new, more portable furniture appeared, including folding chairs and small tables, called tabourets, which could be moved easily from room to room. These tendencies led directly to the more fanciful and curving forms of Louis XV furniture.

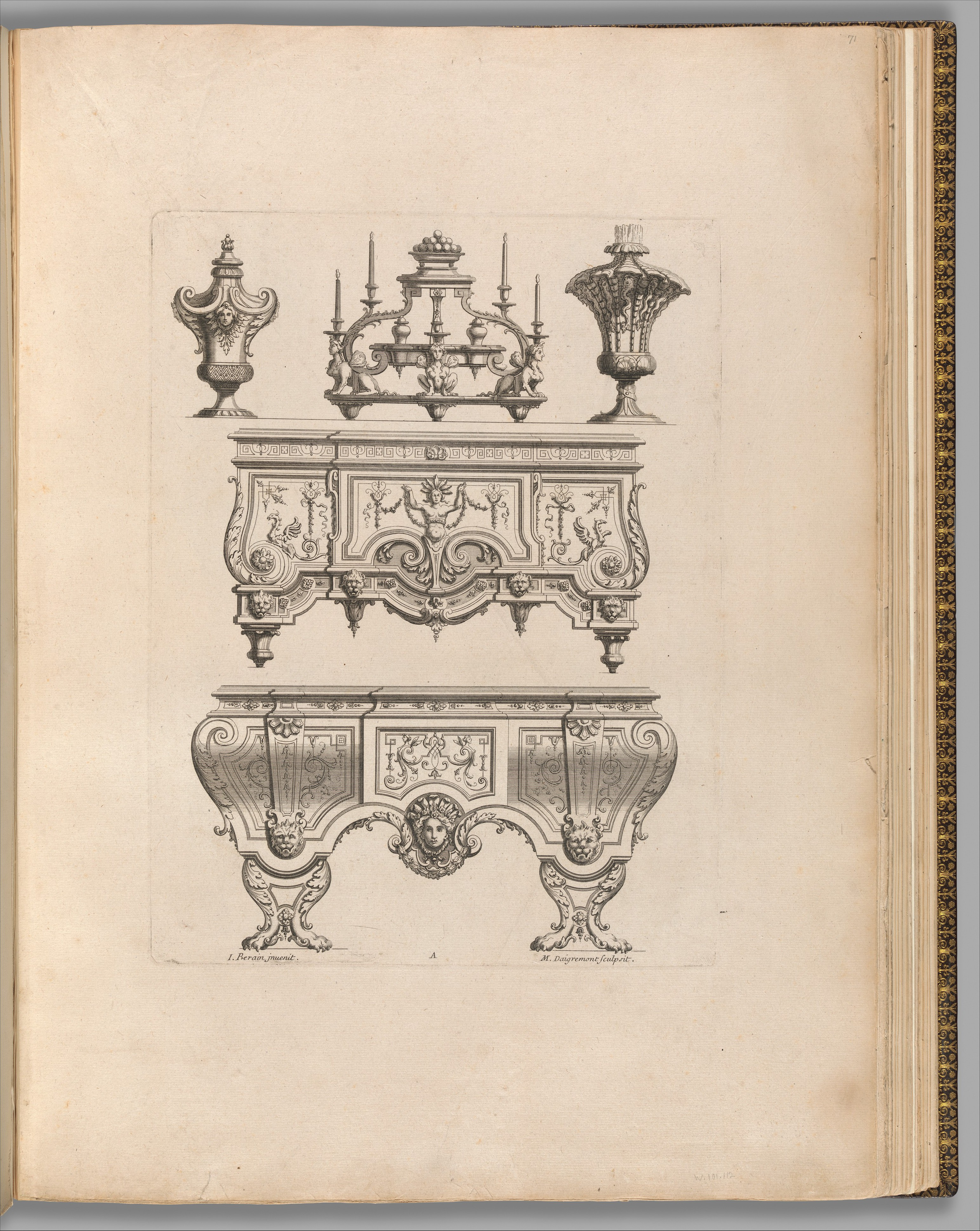
Furniture designs by Jean Bérain the Elder (late 17th/early 18th century)

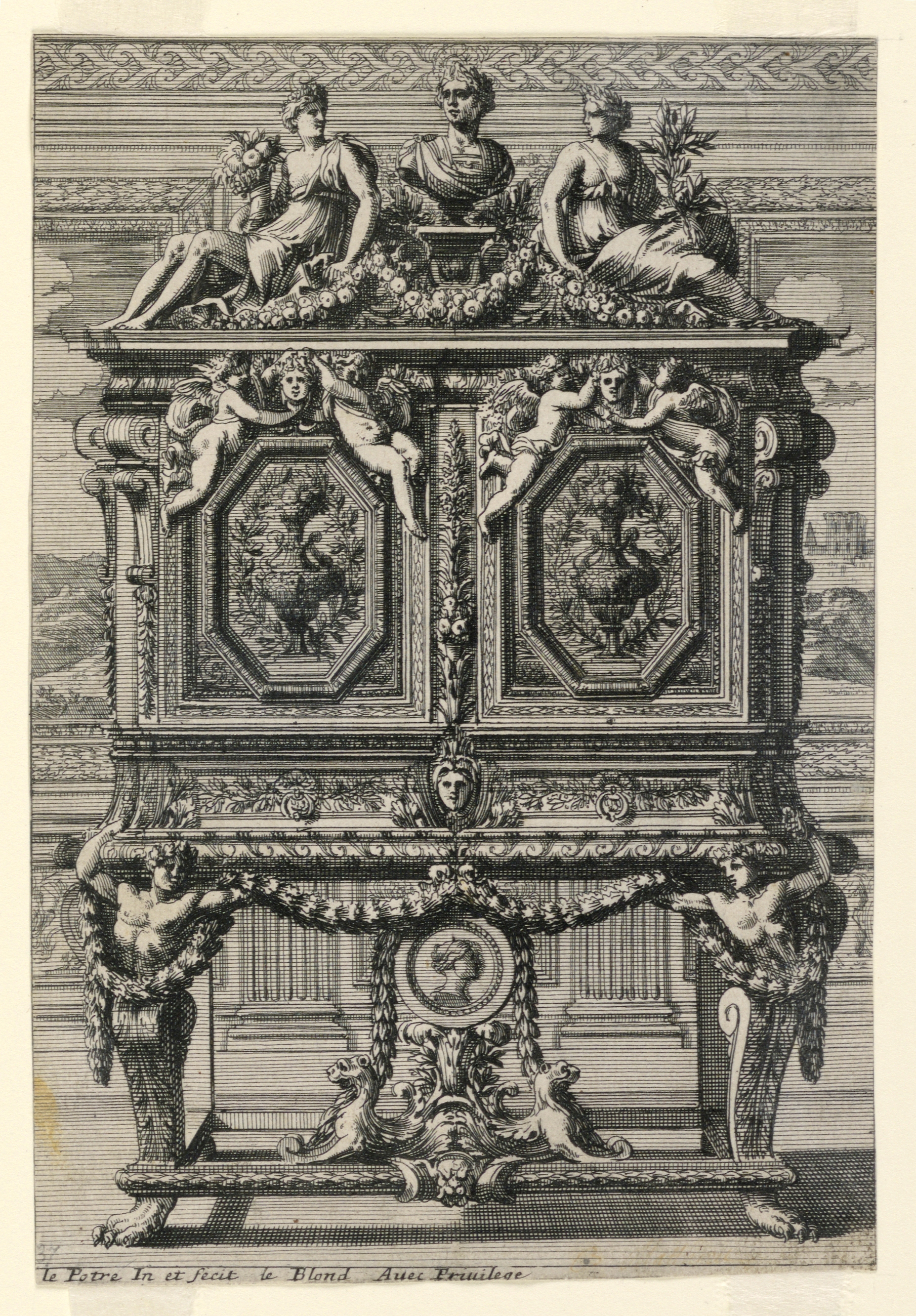
Design for a chest by Jean Le Pautre (circa 1675)

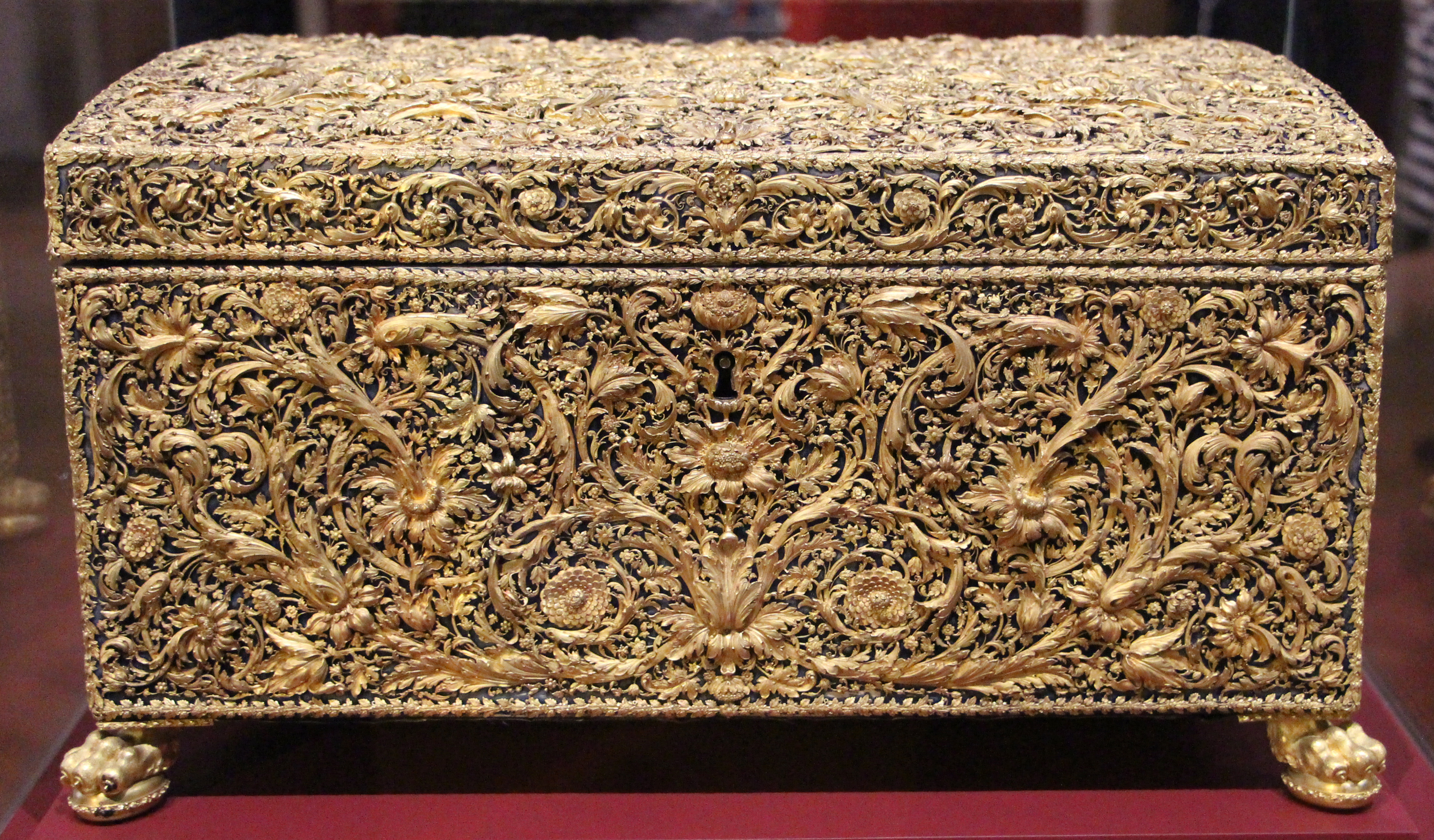
Jewel chest of Louis XIV (1676), the Louvre

== Chairs and sofas ==
The armchairs chairs of the early Louis XIV style had legs in a form called en gaine or en balustre, which were lavishly decorated with sculpted and often gilded ornaments called godsons, cannelures and feuillages, or leaves. The four legs were connected for support by a cross beam under the chair in the form of an H, which evolved into an X. The chairs were upholstered either with leather or with tapestry. The feet of chairs were either en gain, or geometric and tapering, or en console, with a curved S form. An early version of the sofa appeared, a canapé which looked like two armchairs joined together. In the later period of the Louis XIV style, the amount of decoration on the frame diminished, and their form became more graceful and curving. The feet en console often ended in the form known as a "deer's foot", or a gilded bronze shoe. The fauteuil à la reine, or queen's armchair, was introduced and became a popular form which continued to be made, with various modifications, throughout the reigns of Louis XV and XVI. The fauteuil en confessional was another innovation, an armchair with wings with thick cushions on either side of the head. Another innovation was the fauteuil à os de mouton, which featured braces between the legs in the form of curving sheep bones.

In the early years of the reign, the King demanded that all members of the court, no matter what their rank, remain standing, often for very long periods, while he was seated in a fauteuil, or armchair. Later, princes and princesses were allowed to sit on simple tabourets, stools made of cane. Gradually this privilege was extended to Duchessses, then other high nobility, and eventually to all the official members of the Court Portable chairs were invented to meet the changing demands of court protocol. These included chairs with cane backs, folding chairs (ployants) and a variety of tabourets.

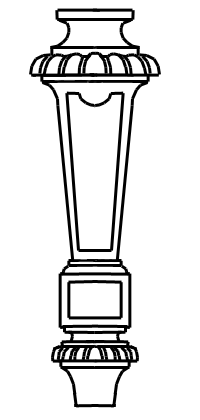
Foot of chair en balustre

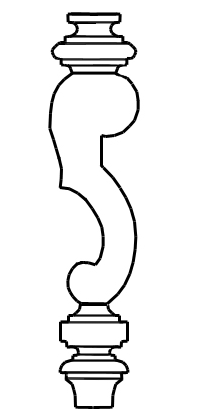
Foot of chair en console

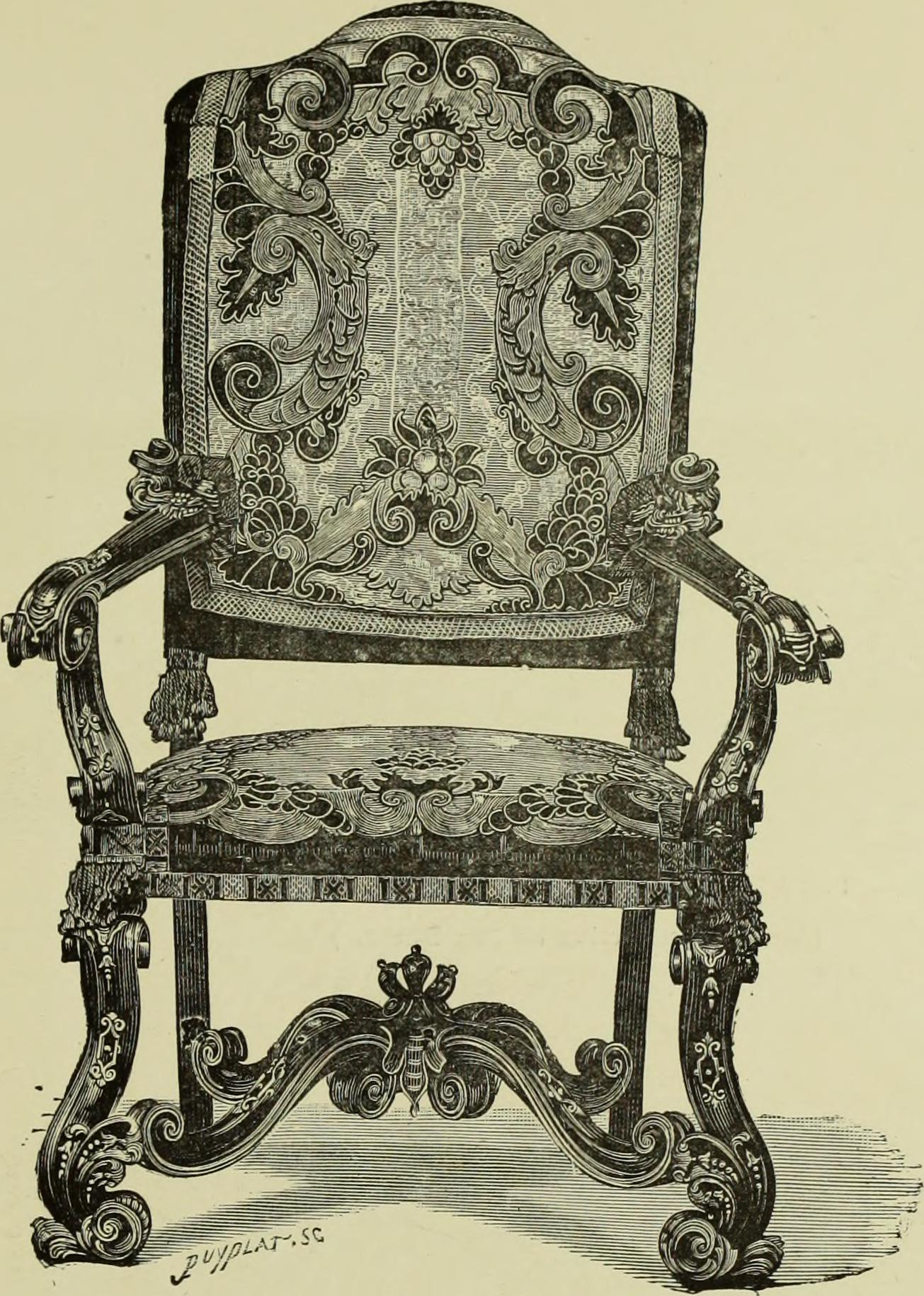
Fauteuil à la reine

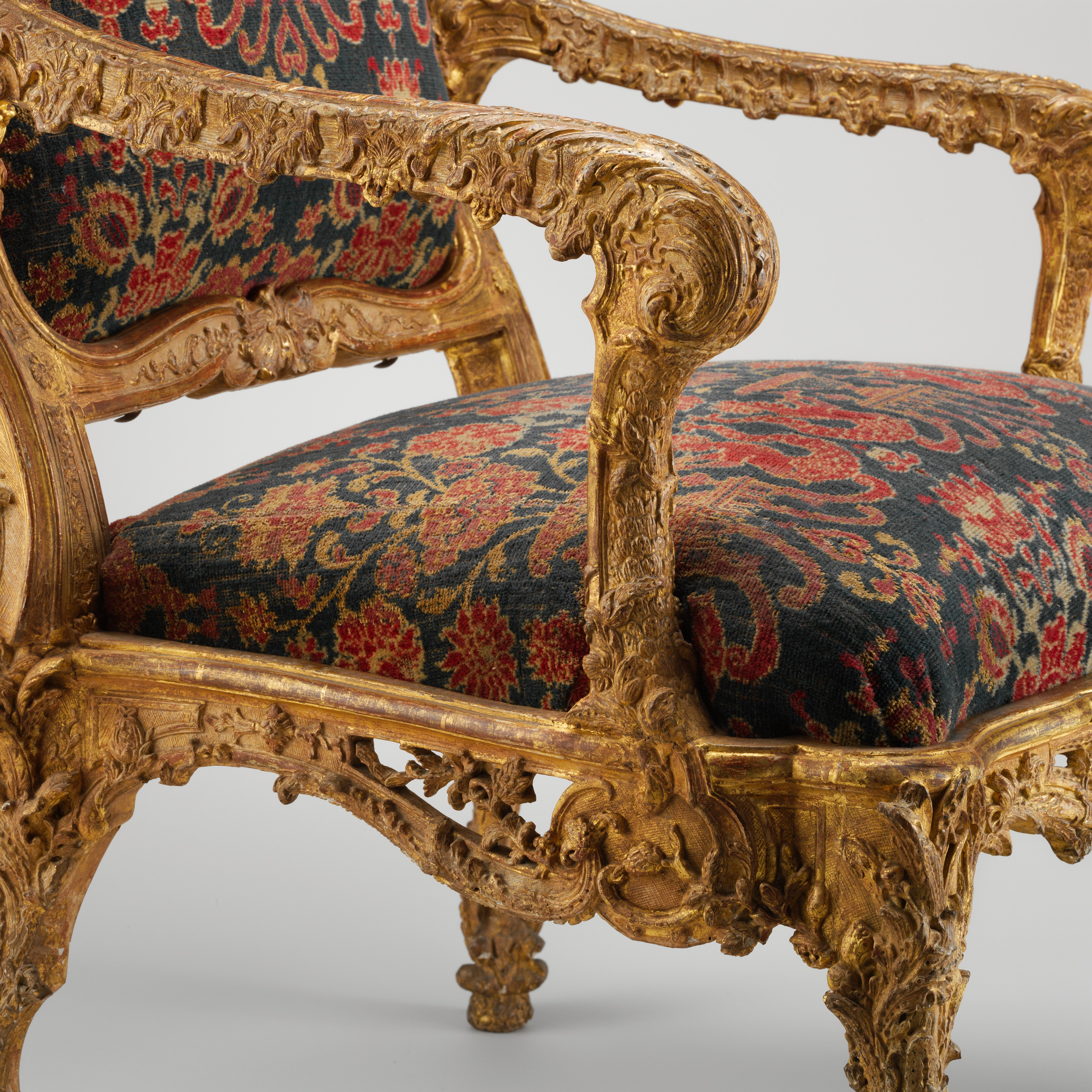
Detail of a fauteuil à la reine (1690–1710), Metropolitan Museum

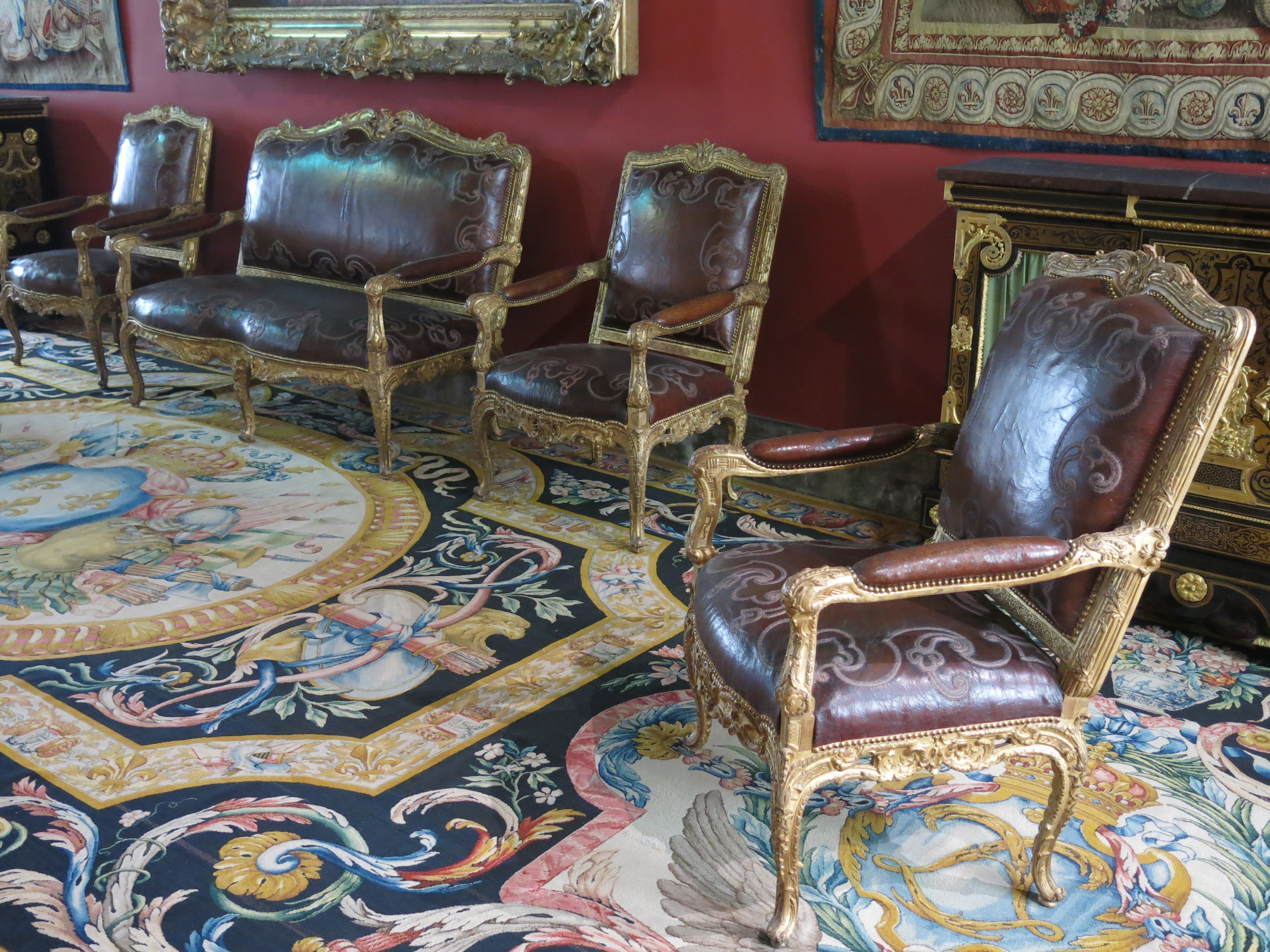
Sofa and armchairs à la reine (1710–20), Louvre Museum

== Tables ==
Tables had the same two types of feet and legs as chairs; either en gaine or en balustre. The brace between the legs underneath was often in an X form, and the meeting place often had a very elaborate console with reverse S shapes. The ceinture or belt around the edge of the table was richly ornamented with sculptural decoration, which often cascaded downwards.

The console was a particular type of table made to stand against a wall; it usually had a plaque of marble on top, and was richly ornamented, but only on side facing the room.

In the later Louis XIV period, under the influence of Boulle, marquetry became the dominant decoration of tables. A particularly fine example is a table by André-Charles Boulle, from 1670–80, which features marquetry made with an assortment of woods, plus pewter, brass, copper, horn, and tortoiseshell; it is now in the California Palace of the Legion of Honor in San Francisco. A variant of this design by Boulle from the same period is found in the Getty Museum in Los Angeles.

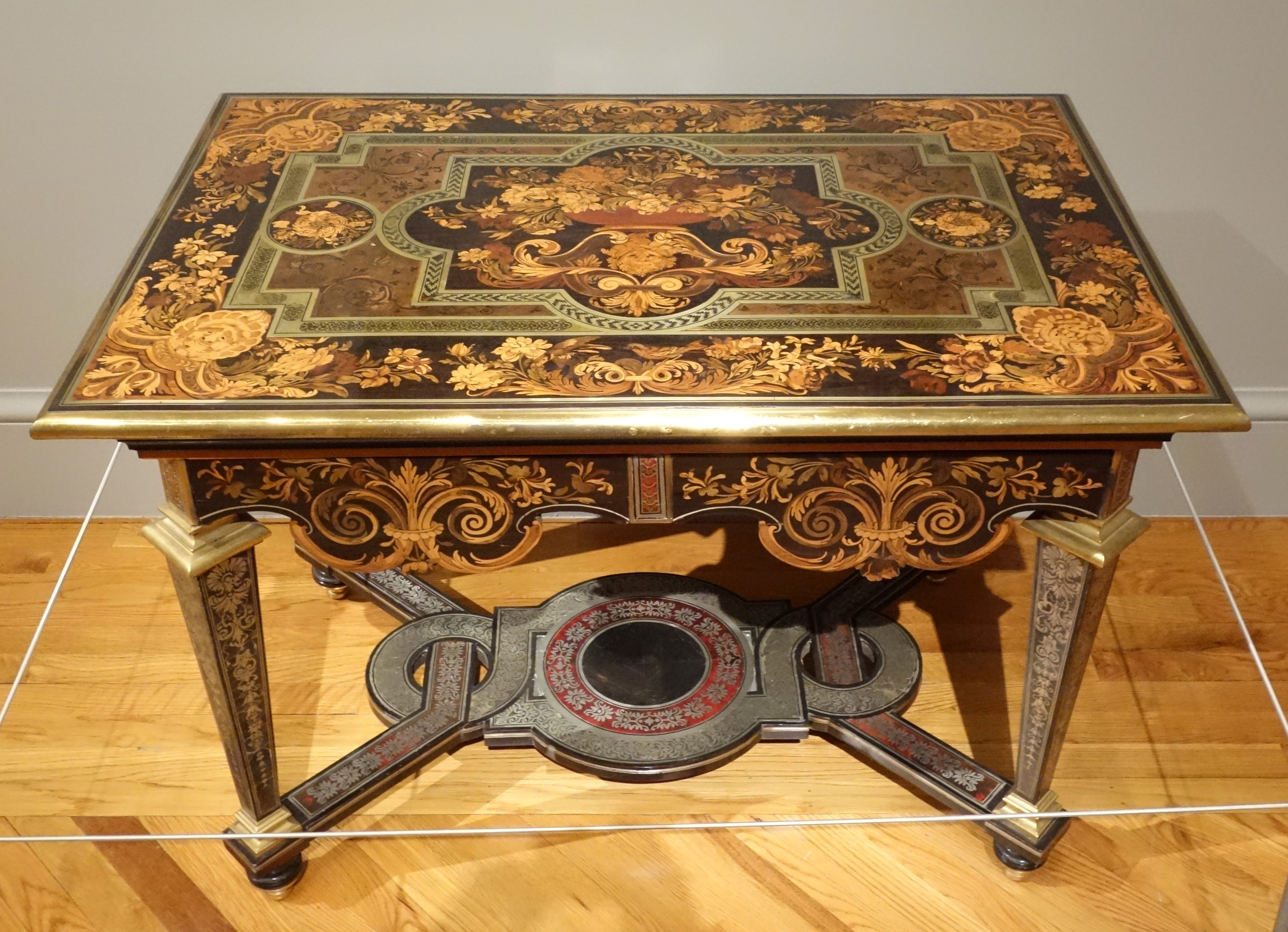
Table by André-Charles Boulle (1670–80), California Palace of the Legion of Honor

== Commodes and chests ==
The ornate and heavy chests of Louis XIII gradually disappeared were replaced by a new item of furniture, the commode, which had a column of drawers. In the earlier years of Louis XIV the chests were massive and geometric, sometimes with columns and pediments and panels of wood with carved decorative elements in diamond and other geometric shapes. The early chests and commodes were often of dark wood, which made them sombre. André-Charles Boulle lightened the appearance of the commodes with marquetry of ivory, mother of pearl, tin, and brass. He also used different colored woods to create elaborate floral bouquets and other designs.

A variety of specialized chests were created, including bibliothèques or bookcases; médailliers for displaying medals; and special cabinets or stands for clocks, which were large and heavy.

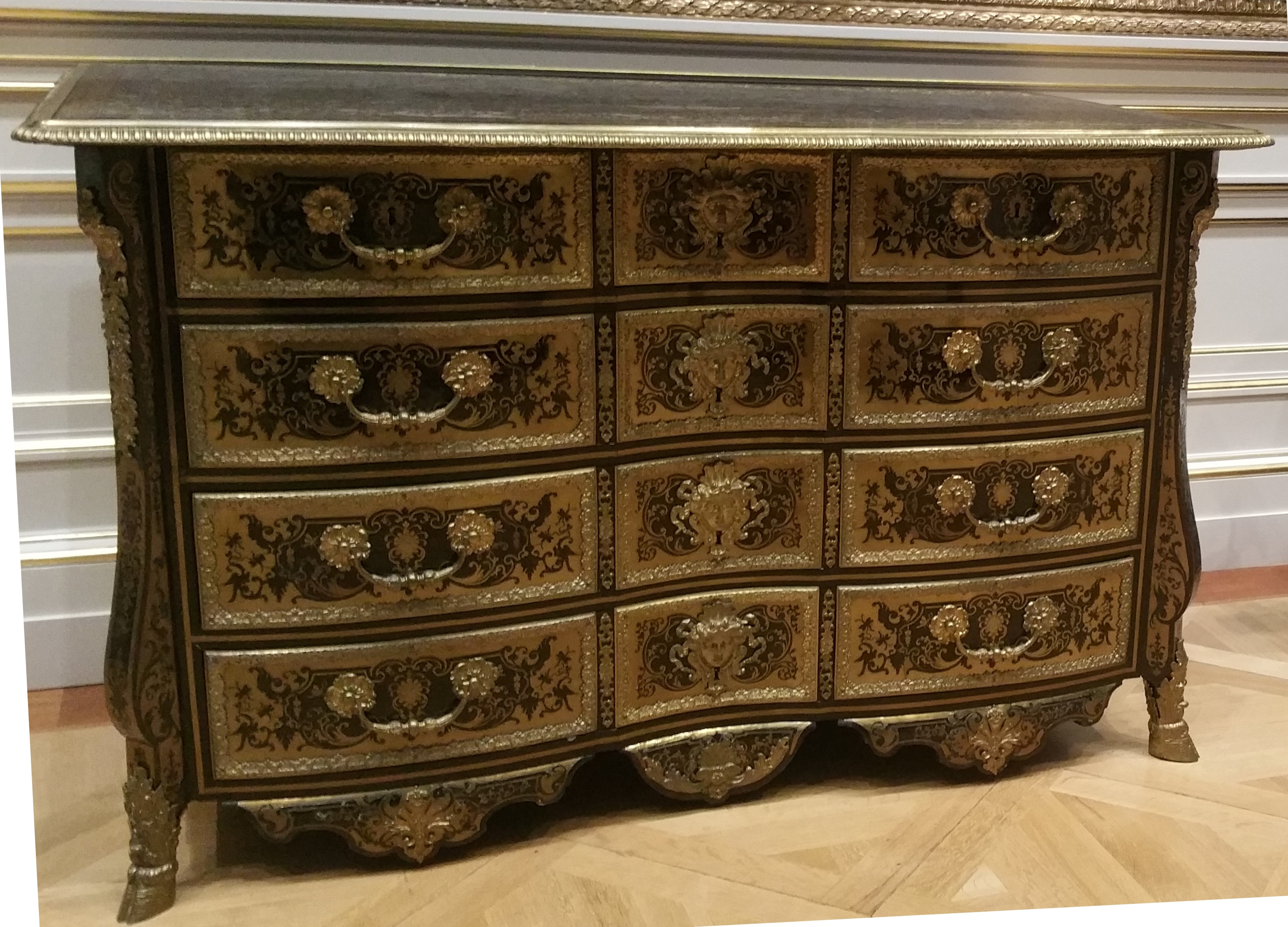
Early commode by André Charles Boulle, Wallace Collection

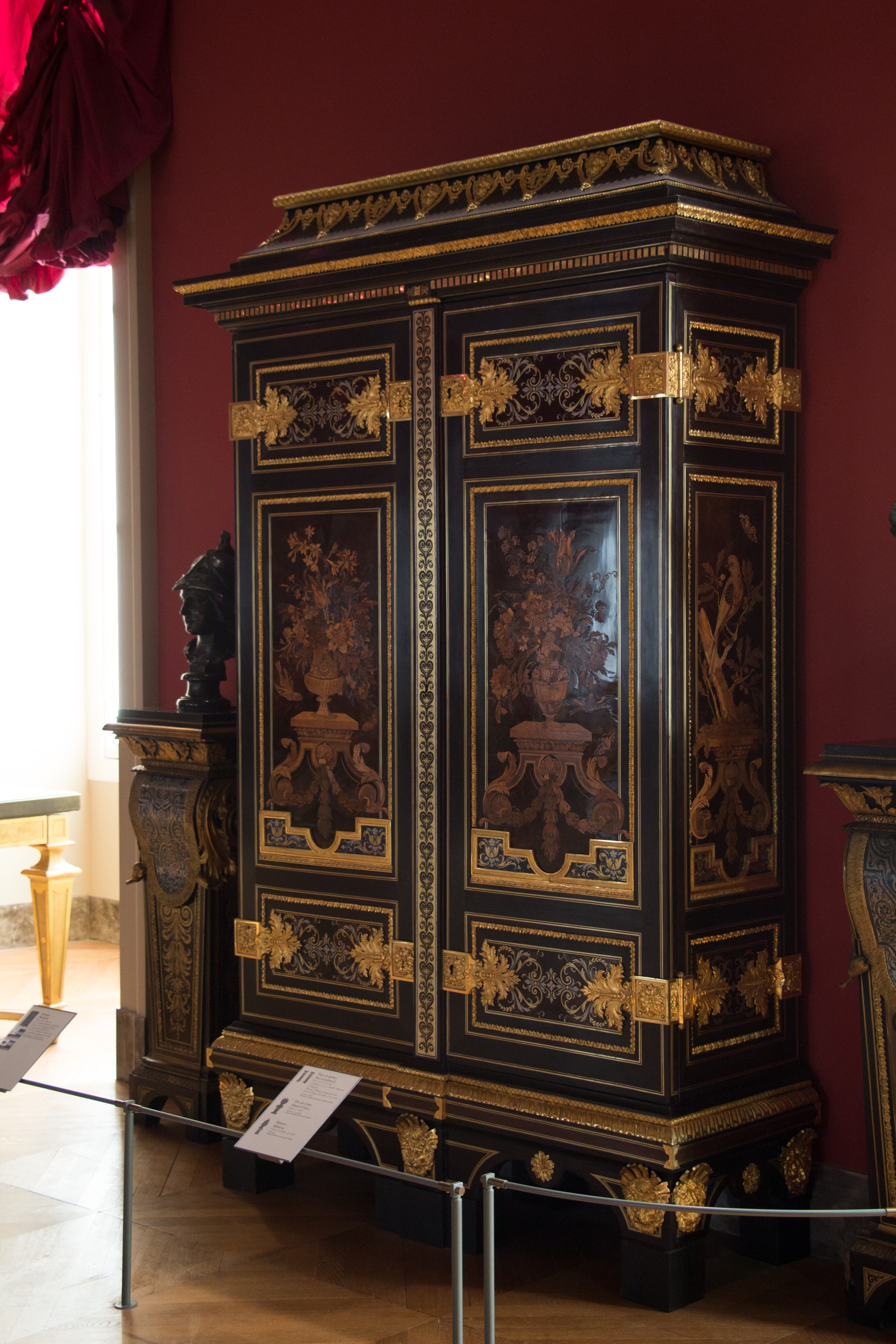
Armoire with marquetry in parakeet pattern by André Charles Boulle (1680–1700), Louvre

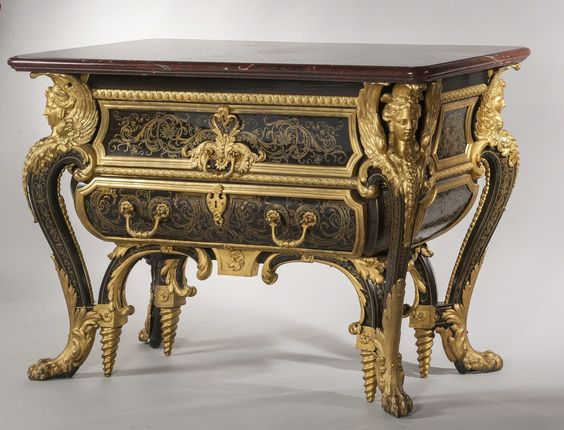
Commode by André Charles Boulle for the Grand Trianon (1710)

== Desks ==
The bureau or desk in its rough modern form appeared under Louis XIV. The earliest version was the Mazarin desk, named for Louis's prime minister, Cardinal Mazarin. It had two columns of three drawers each, each mounted on four feet and connected by an E-shaped brace, supporting a flat writing surface with a single drawer beneath. Later variations included a folding top. Later in the reign, the Mazarin desk was replaced by a large flat-topped writing table with four legs and two drawers. A very elegant version of this desk was made by André-Charles Boulle, for Nicolas Fouquet, the King's minister of finance, for his château at Vaux-le-Vicomte.

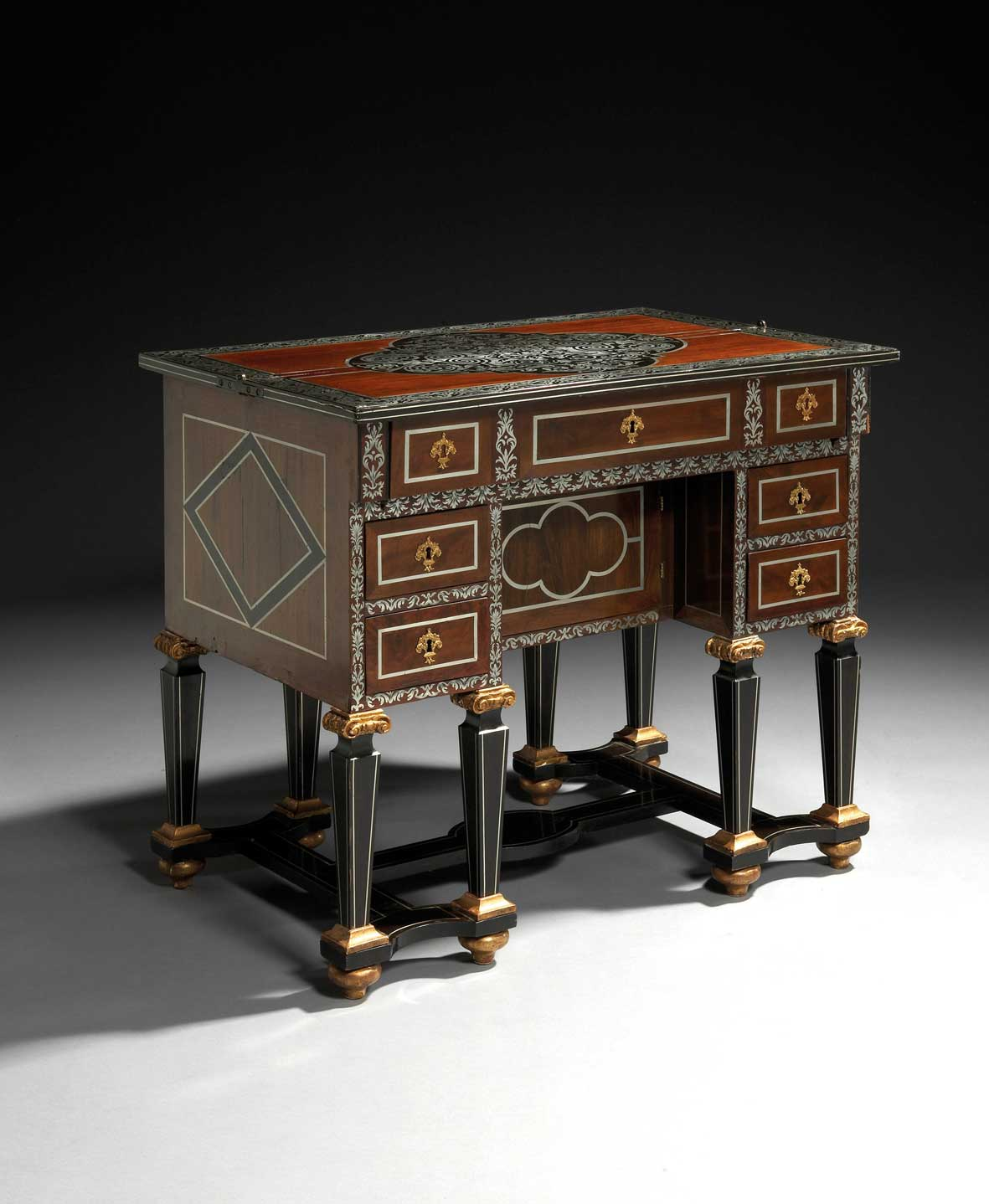
Early Mazarin desk

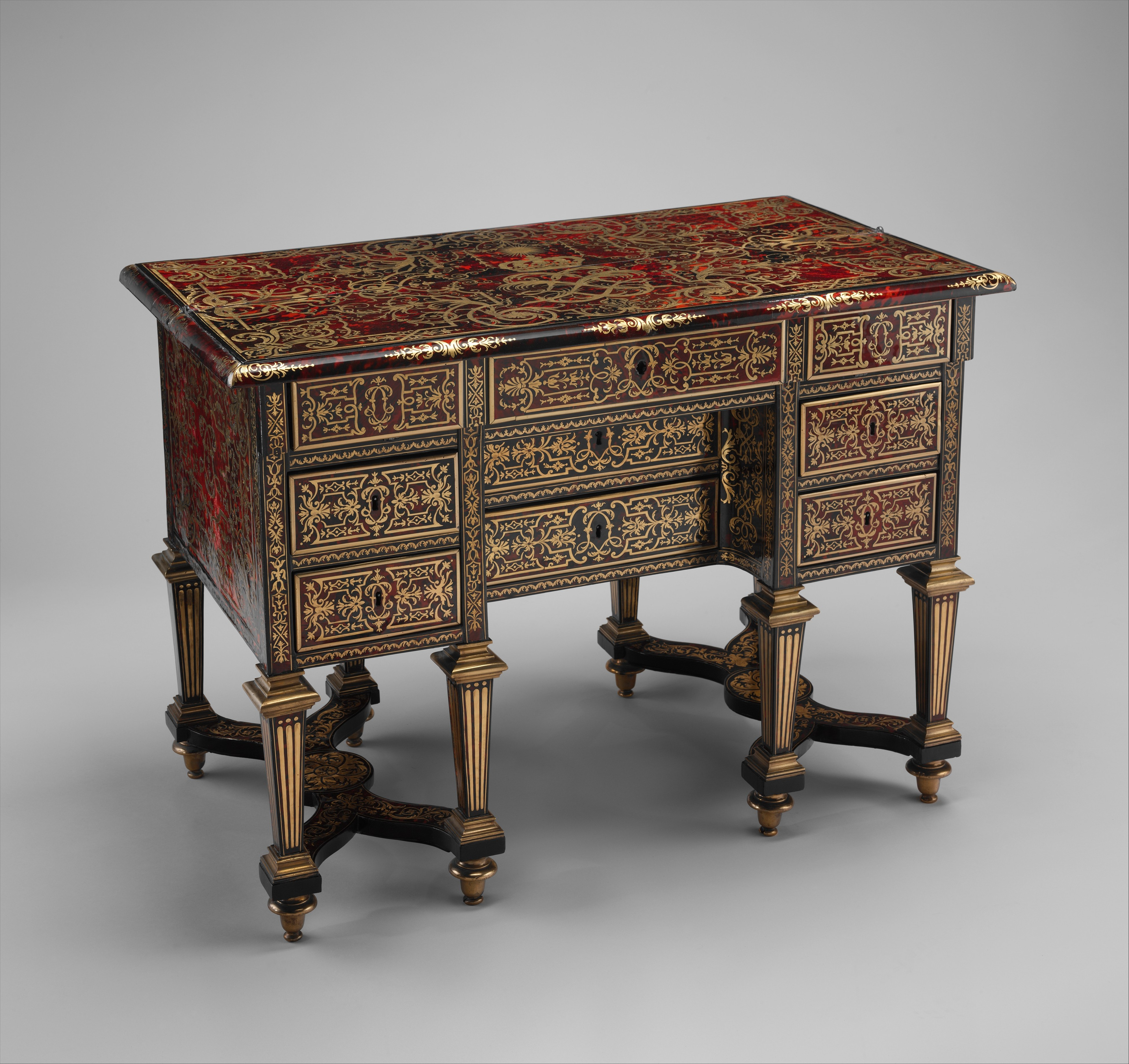
Desk with folding top (dated 1685) designed by Jean Bérain the Elder, made by Alexandre-Jean Oppenordt

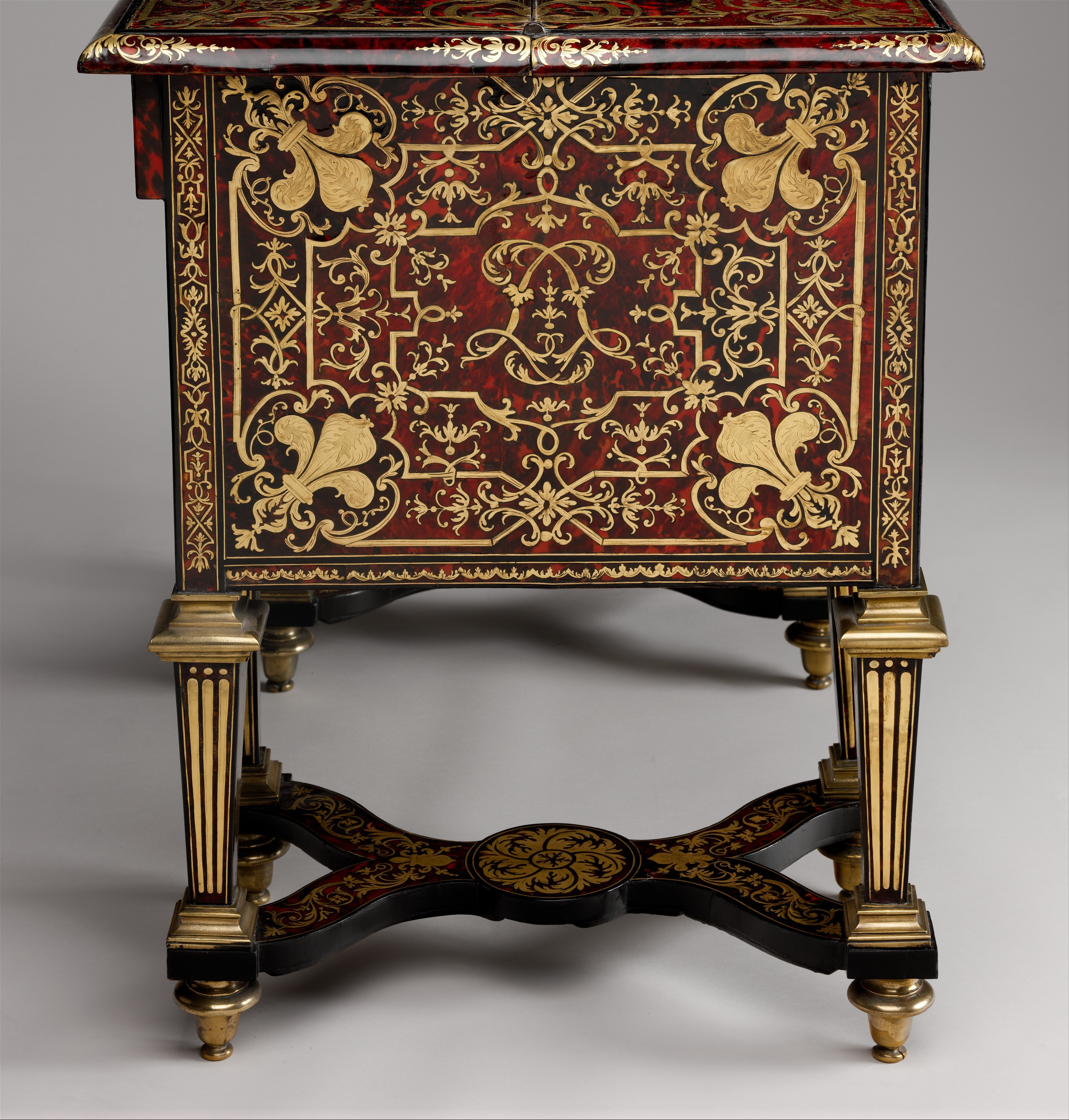
Side of desk by Jean Bérain the Elder (1685)

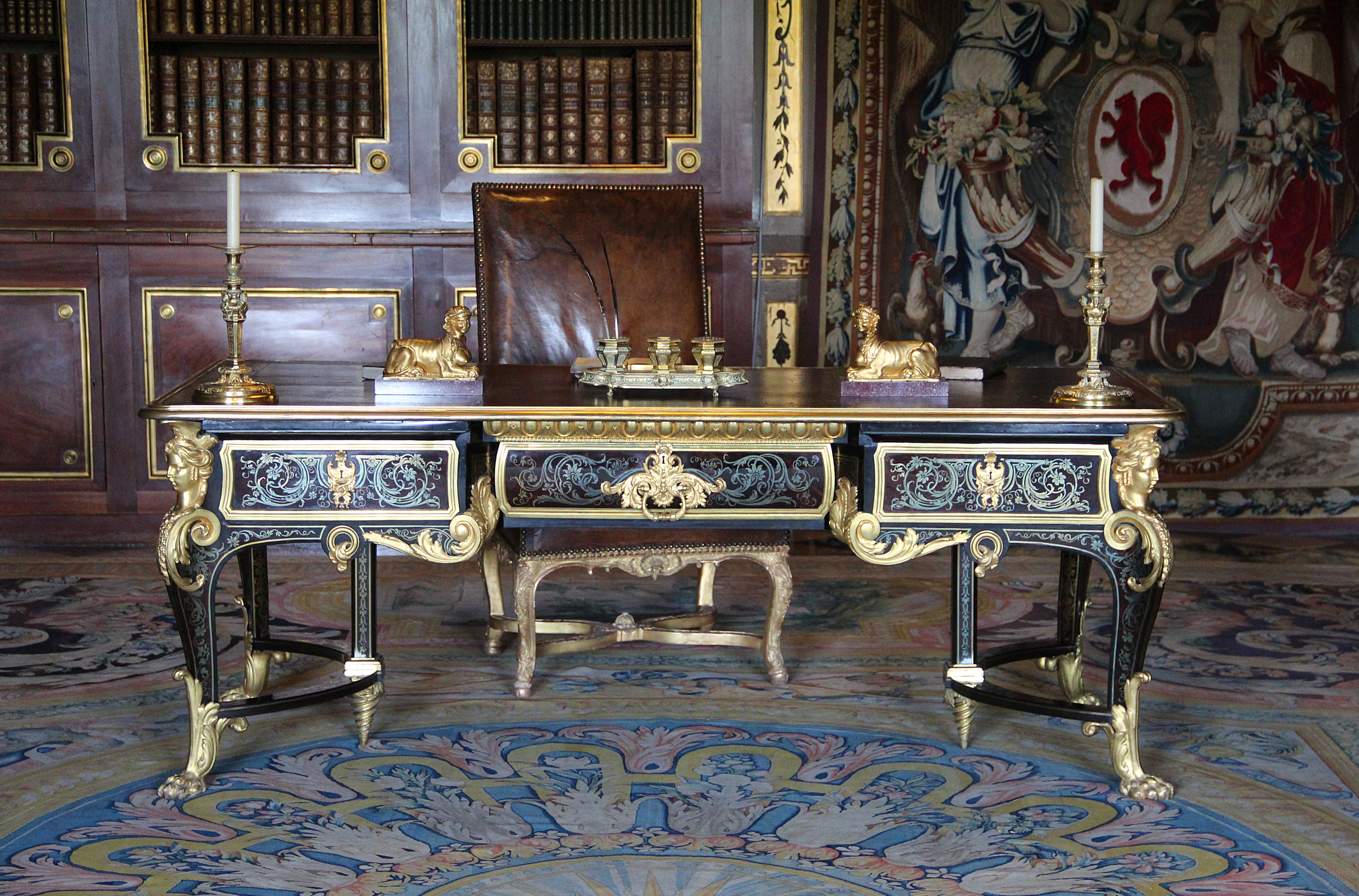
Desk of Nicolas Fouquet by André-Charles Boulle at the Château of Vaux-le-Vicomte

== Beds ==
The bedroom was a place of ceremony under Louis XIV. The formal awakening of the King at the Palace of Versaille was a daily event, which any member of the Court or visitor to the Palace could attend. It was common for members of the nobility to receive guests when they were in bed. The beds had very high canopies and draperies supported by four posts and a rectangual frame or panel, called a tester, above. The draperies were largely to keep heat in and drafts out. The beds were separated from the rest of the room by a balustrade.

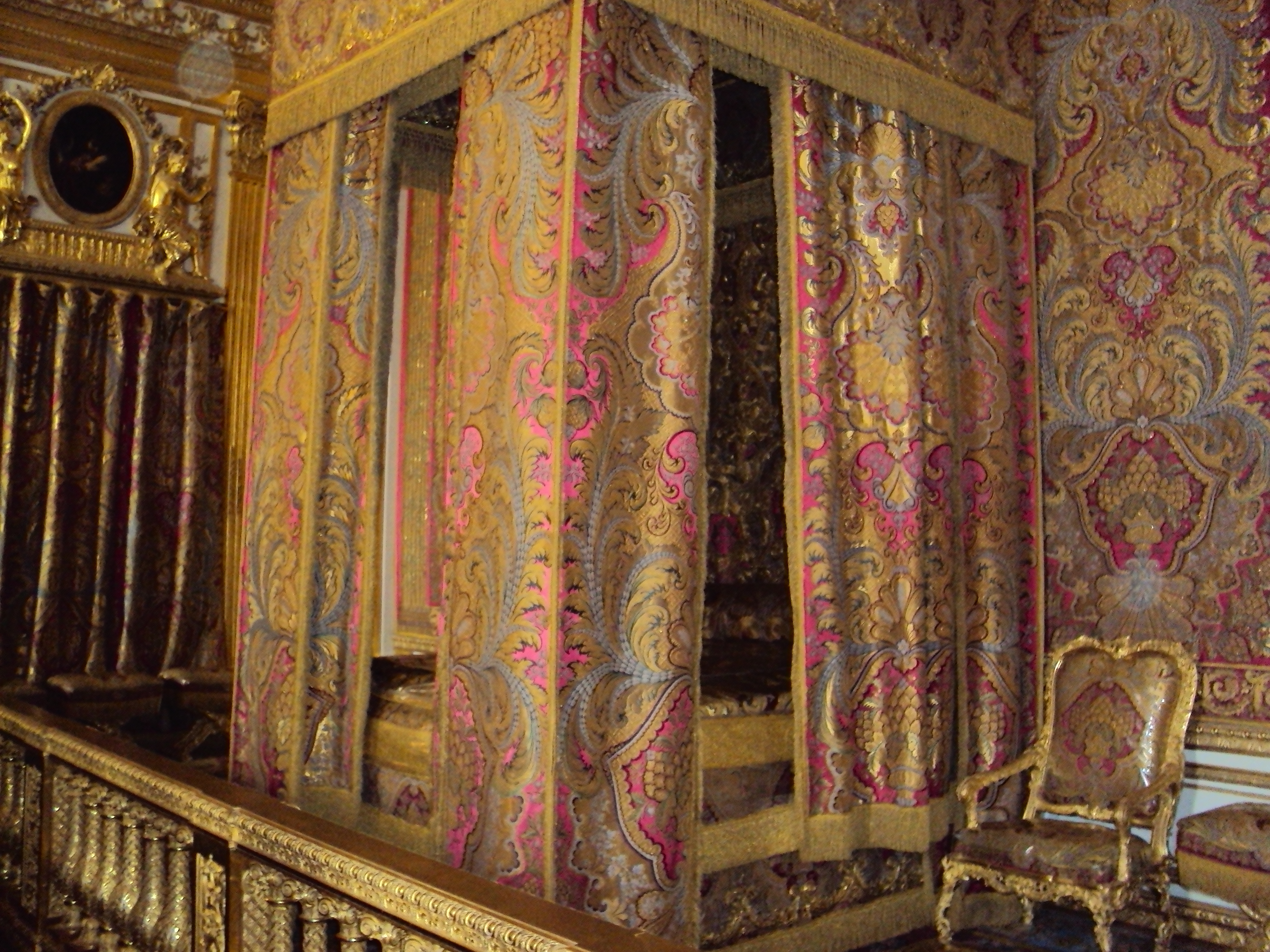
Bed of Louis XIV at the Palace of Versailles

== Notable designers of Louis XIV period ==
- André-Charles Boulle
- Charles Le Brun
- Jean Bérain the Elder
- Jean Bérain the Younger
- Philippe Caffieri
- Pierre Maillé
- Charles Errard
- E. Levasseur
- Daniel Marot
- André Brustolone

== Bibliography ==
- De Morant, Henry (1970). Histoire des arts décoratifs. Librarie Hacahette.
- Cabanne, Perre (1988), L'Art Classique et le Baroque, Paris: Larousse, ISBN 978-2-03-583324-2
- Ducher, Robert (1988), Caractéristique des Styles, Paris: Flammarion, ISBN 2-08-011539-1
- Renault, Christophe (2006), Les Styles de l'architecture et du mobilier, Paris: Gisserot, ISBN 978-2-877-4746-58
