= Philippe Caffieri =

Philippe Caffieri may refer to:

- Philippe Caffieri (1714–1774), French sculptor
- Philippe Caffieri (1634–1716), Italian decorative sculptor, active mainly in France

== See also ==
- Caffieri family
