= Jean Bérain =

Jean Bérain may refer to:

- Jean Bérain the Elder (1638–1711), French draughtsman and designer
- Jean Bérain the Younger (1678–1726), French designer, son of the above
