= Caffieri family =

Italian family of sculptors

The Caffieri family was an Italian family of sculptors active in France in the 17th and 18th centuries.

== Descent ==
Daniele Caffiéri (1603–1639), whose children included

- Philippe Caffieri (1634–1716), whose children included
  - François-Charles Caffieri (1667–1729), whose children included
    - Charles-Philippe Caffieri (1695–1766), whose children included
      - Charles-Marie Caffieri (1736–1779)
  - Jacques Caffieri (1678–1755), whose children included
    - Philippe Caffieri (1714–1774)
    - Jean-Jacques Caffieri (1725–1792)
