= Isaac II Thuret =

French clockmaker

- Born: c. 1630s France
- Died: 1706; Paris, France
- Occupations: Clockmaker, Horologist
- Known for: Collaboration with Christiaan Huygens on the spring-driven watch
- Notable work: Early spring-balance watches
- Title: Horloger Ordinaire du Roi (Clockmaker to the King)
- Children: Jacques Thuret

Isaac II Thuret, also referred to by historians as Isaac Thuret (c. 1630s, d. 1706) was a French clockmaker and horologist known for developing the first spring-driven watches in collaboration with Dutch scientist Christiaan Huygens. Thuret's role in the invention was obscured by disputes over intellectual credit.

== Early life ==
Born into a Protestant family, Thruet may have trained under his brother-in-law Charles Sarrabat and was admitted as a master before 1662.

== Career ==
In 1663 he married Margaret (or Madeleine) Hélot. By that time Thuret had already been named Marchand Horlogeur Ordinaire du Roi and, by 1672, Horloger Ordinaire du Roi et de l'Académie des Sciences. Contemporary observers regarded him as the foremost craftsman of his generation: Germain Brice praised his mathematical skill, the astronomer Jean Richer said his precision surpassed all rivals, and Leibniz referred to him as "the famous clockmaker."

Thuret and his brother Jacque were considered a "clockmaking family" with a reputation for excellence. By the mid-17th century, he had established himself as a respected clockmaker in Paris, serving as Horloger Ordinaire du Roi (Clockmaker to the King) under Louis XIV. His workshop produced clocks and watches admired for both technical refinement and aesthetic craftsmanship, which led to a collaboration with Christian Huygens, a Dutch physicist and mathematician and inventor of the pendulum clock, who contracted Thruet to produce the first pendulum clocks made outside of the Netherlands.

=== Collaboration with Christiaan Huygens ===
==== Spring-driven watches ====
In the early 1675, Christiaan Huygens was experimenting with ways to improve the accuracy of portable timepieces. Huygens theorized that a spiral balance spring could regulate a watch's oscillations. Thuret transformed Huygens's concept into functional working models—spring-driven watches—which advanced horology and produced unprecedented precision timekeeping. In addition to the advantage of accurate, portable timepieces on land, it marked a turning point in navigation at sea as a breakthrough in solving the "Longitude Problem".

==== Propriatary dispute ====
A dispute soon arose between Thuret and Huygens over credit for the invention. Huygens insisted that the balance spring watch was his intellectual property alone, while Thuret maintained that his own technical innovations were essential to making the concept workable. Surviving correspondence between Huygens, Thuret, and the French Academy of Sciences suggests Thuret may have felt unfairly excluded from recognition. Ultimately, Huygens secured priority for the invention, and Thuret's contributions were minimized in historical accounts of the scientific revolution.

== Death and legacy ==
He died in 1706. His son, Jacques Thuret, succeeded him as a royal clockmaker and carried on the family's reputation in horology.

Thuret maintains his reputation for craftsmanship and design. As of 2025, timepieces are exhibited in the Metropolitan Museum of Art and in the Frick Collection.

== See also ==
- Christiaan Huygens
- History of Watches
- Horology
- Thuret family
