= Thuret family =

The Thuret family of clockmakers established themselves as one of the outstanding craftsman-dynasties in 17th- and 18th-century Paris. Their clocks are signed "Thuret", and distinguishing which member of the Thuret family made a specific clock is sometimes an unrewarding effort.

== History ==
Isaac Thuret (1630–1706), also referred to as Isaac II Thuret, one of the first French clockmakers to make pendulum clocks, held the royal appointment. His son Jacques III Thuret (1669–1738), was appointed clockmaker to Louis XIV in 1694. A perquisite of the royal appointment was the use of workshops in the Galeries du Louvre, where since the time of Henri IV, the outstanding artists, designers and craftsmen were granted workshop spaces, fostering cross-fertilisation among the arts. As one consequence there are numerous clocks by the Thuret dynasty in cases of rich tortoiseshell and brass marquetry designed by André Charles Boulle; one such remarkable clock by Jacques Thuret or his father is at the Metropolitan Museum of Art in New York. Another example, the Barometer Clock, is at the Frick Collection, also in New York.

Jacques III Thuret married a daughter of the royal designer Jean Bérain the Elder, whose designs he assembled and published; his daughter Suzanne married the painter, draughtsman and engraver Charles François Silvestre.

== See also ==
Isaac II Thuret
