= Henri de Gissey =

French draughtsman and designer

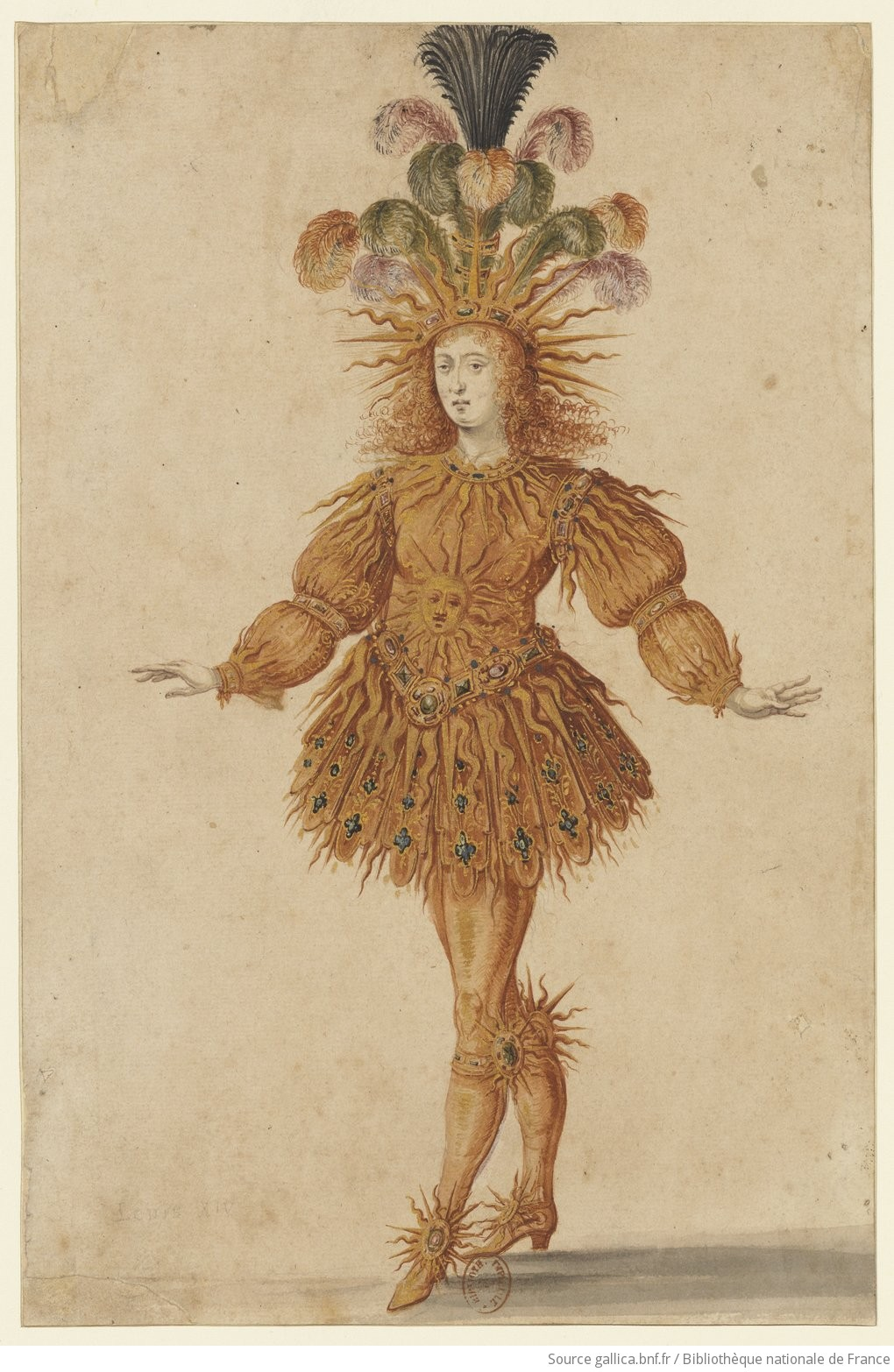
Apollo costume worn by Louis XIV in the Ballet of the Night (1653)

Henri (de) Gissey (ca 1621 – 1673) was a French draughtsman and designer who held the post of dessinateur de la Chambre et du cabinet de Roi in the Menus Plaisirs du Roi in the early years of Louis XIV. Jean Bérain the Elder, who succeeded him in the post, is likely to have been in some sense his pupil. Gissey's appointment made him responsible for the expressions of court style, above all in the elaborately costumed and produced ballets de cour, in which the young king danced among his courtiers; following Colbert's remodelling of the royal household, the Cabinet du Roi, to which Gissey was also attached, produced the sumptuous engraved festival books that often followed such events and are sometimes the only surviving record of them.

His court position demanded in addition to designs for costumes, designs for other kinds of court ceremonial festivities, carried out under the general direction of Louis Hesselin, "Overseer of the King's pleasures", the part of the royal household— the Maison du Roi— in charge of entertainments. Hesselin was a grand collector, patron and amateur of art; for Hesselin's own lavish entertainments for the king, Gissey's office produced the costumes and sets. Several of his pen-and-wash designs for ballets de cour are at the Victoria and Albert Museum. There are several designs for costumes for Louis XIV as Apollo, a role he repeated in numerous court ballets: several are at the Bibliothèque de l'Institut de France. They are reminders of the extent to which the "Sun King" would identify himself as Apollo through consistent iconography at Versailles and in the sculptural program of its gardens and fountains.

Gissey seems to have worked as an engraver as well as a designer.
