= Jean-Jacques Caffieri =

French sculptor (1725–1792)

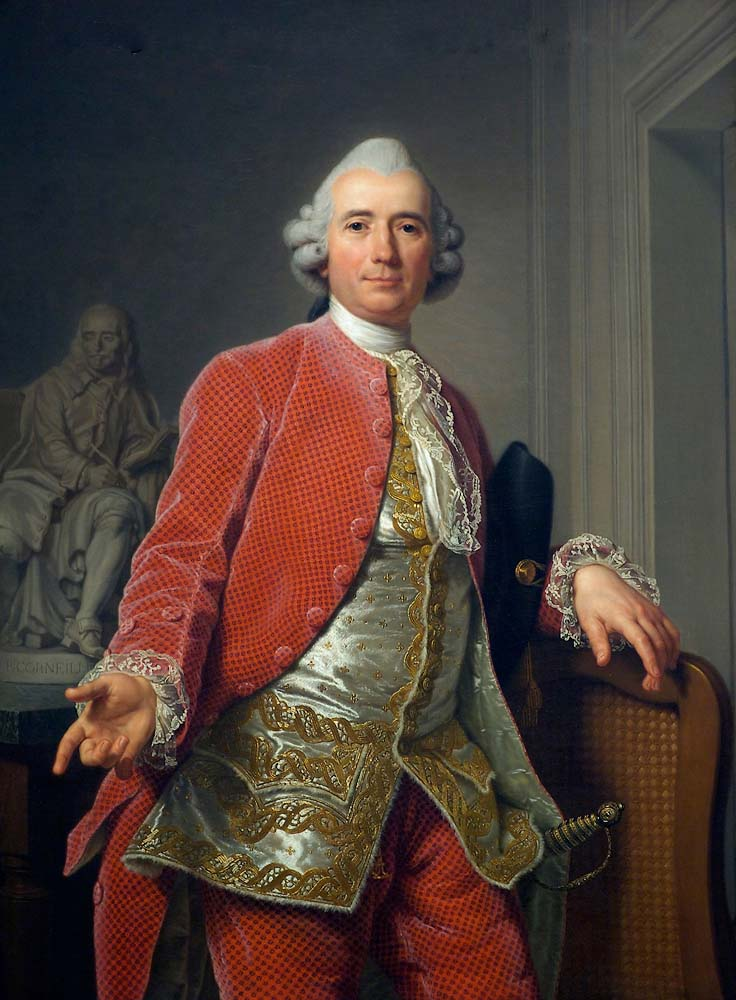
Jean-Jacques Caffieri by Adolf Ulrik Wertmüller, 1784 (Museum of Fine Arts, Boston) - behind Caffieri is a reduced version of his statue of Pierre Corneille, from a series of the "Great Men of France."

Jean-Jacques Caffieri (29 April 1725 – 22 June 1792) was a French sculptor. He was appointed sculpteur du Roi to Louis XV and later afforded lodgings in the Galeries du Louvre. He designed the fine rampe d'escalier which still adorns the Palais Royal. He is better known for his portrait busts, in terracotta or marble: his bust of Madame du Barry is at the Hermitage Museum, St Petersburg. He made a name with his busts of Pierre Corneille and Jean Racine for the foyer of the Comédie Française.

== Life ==
He was born in Paris and came from a family of sculptors from Italy, who had moved to France during cardinal Mazarin's regency. His father Jacques Caffieri and his elder brother Philippe Caffieri were also sculptors. Jean-Jacques remained unmarried and had no children. A pensionary at the Villa Medici in Rome from 1749 to 1753, as well as a student of François Lemoyne, he joined the Académie Royale de Peinture et de Sculpture in France in 1757. He produced bust or portraits of many great men, notably Pierre Corneille, Thomas Corneille, Philippe Quinault, Jean de la Fontaine and Jean-Philippe Rameau, as well as the monument to Richard Montgomery in St. Paul's Chapel in New York City. His students included Jean-Joseph Foucou.

== Bibliography ==
- Auguste Jal, Dictionnaire Critique de Biographie et d'Histoire, Paris, 1867

== Works ==
- Sculptures by Caffieri
- Buste of the comte de Muy (Louis Nicolas Victor de Félix d'Ollières) by Jean-Jacques Caffieri at the Metropolitan Museum of Art in New York City (1776)
- Portrait bust of a young woman, terra cotta (California Palace of the Legion of Honor)

== Gallery ==
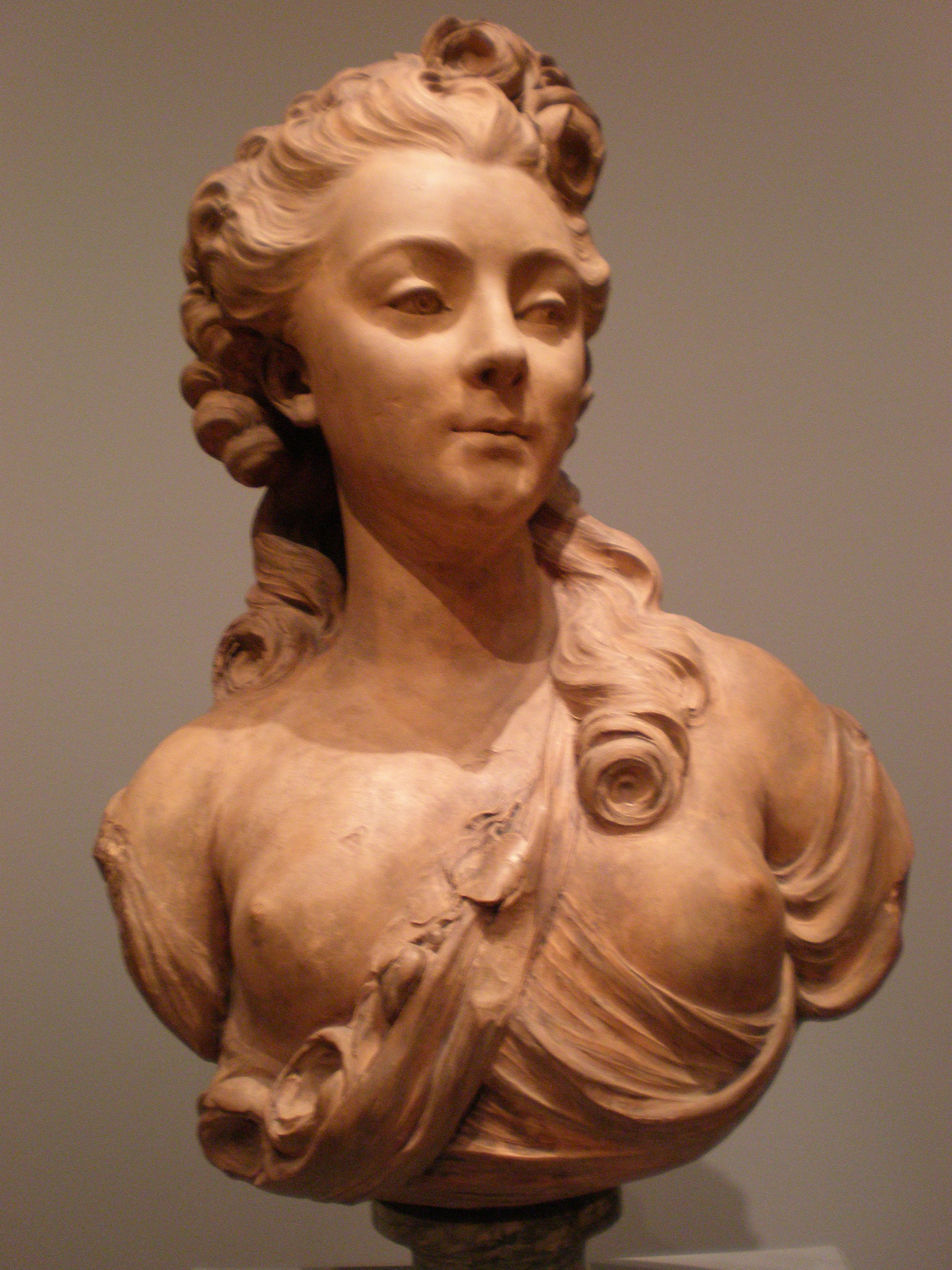
Jean-Jacques Caffieri, ca.1770, Portrait bust of a young woman, terracotta, California Palace of the Legion of Honor, San Francisco

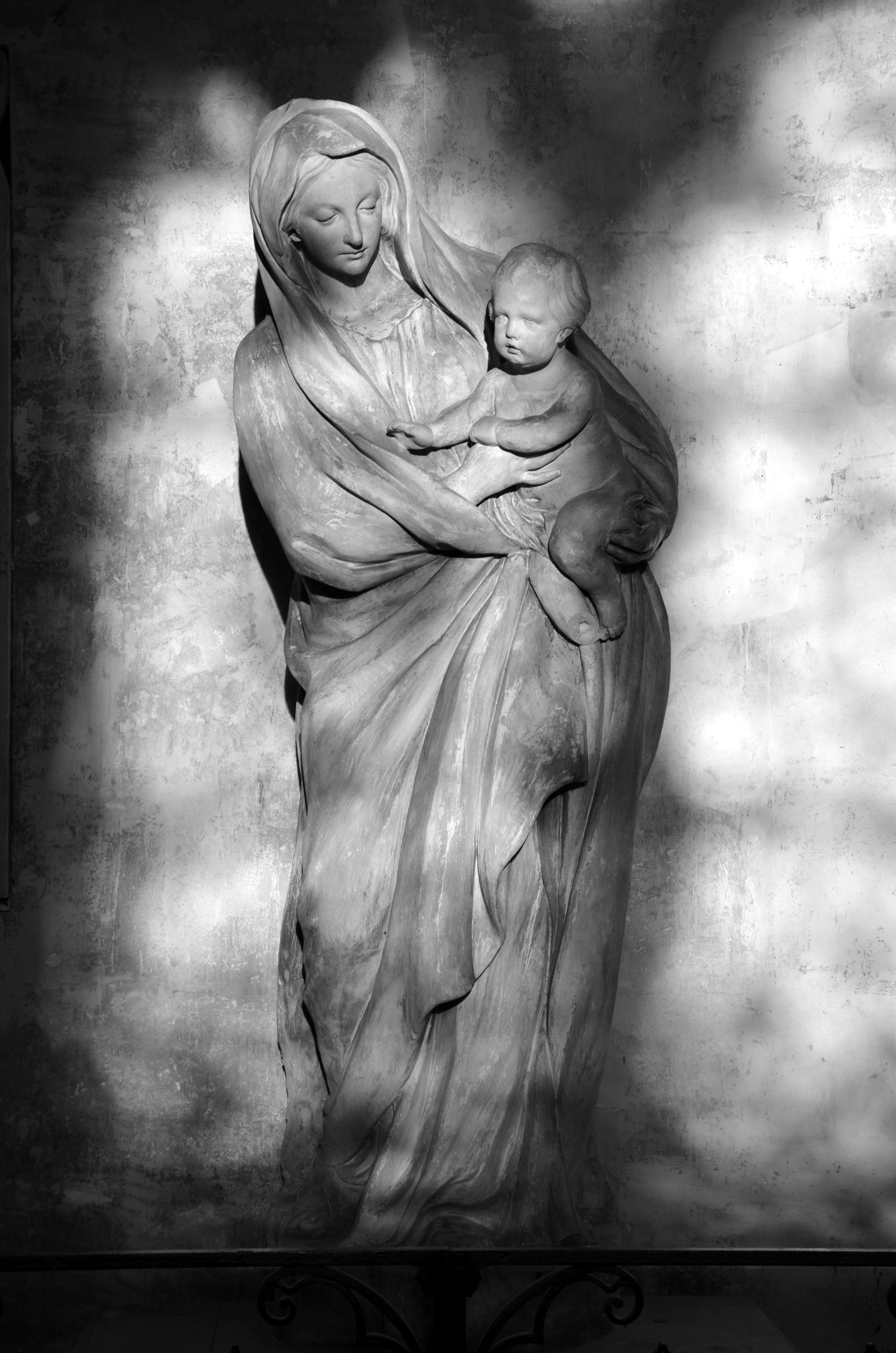
Jean-Jacques Caffieri (attributed), Virgin and Child, Church Saint-Antoine, Compiègne, Oise, Picardie, France

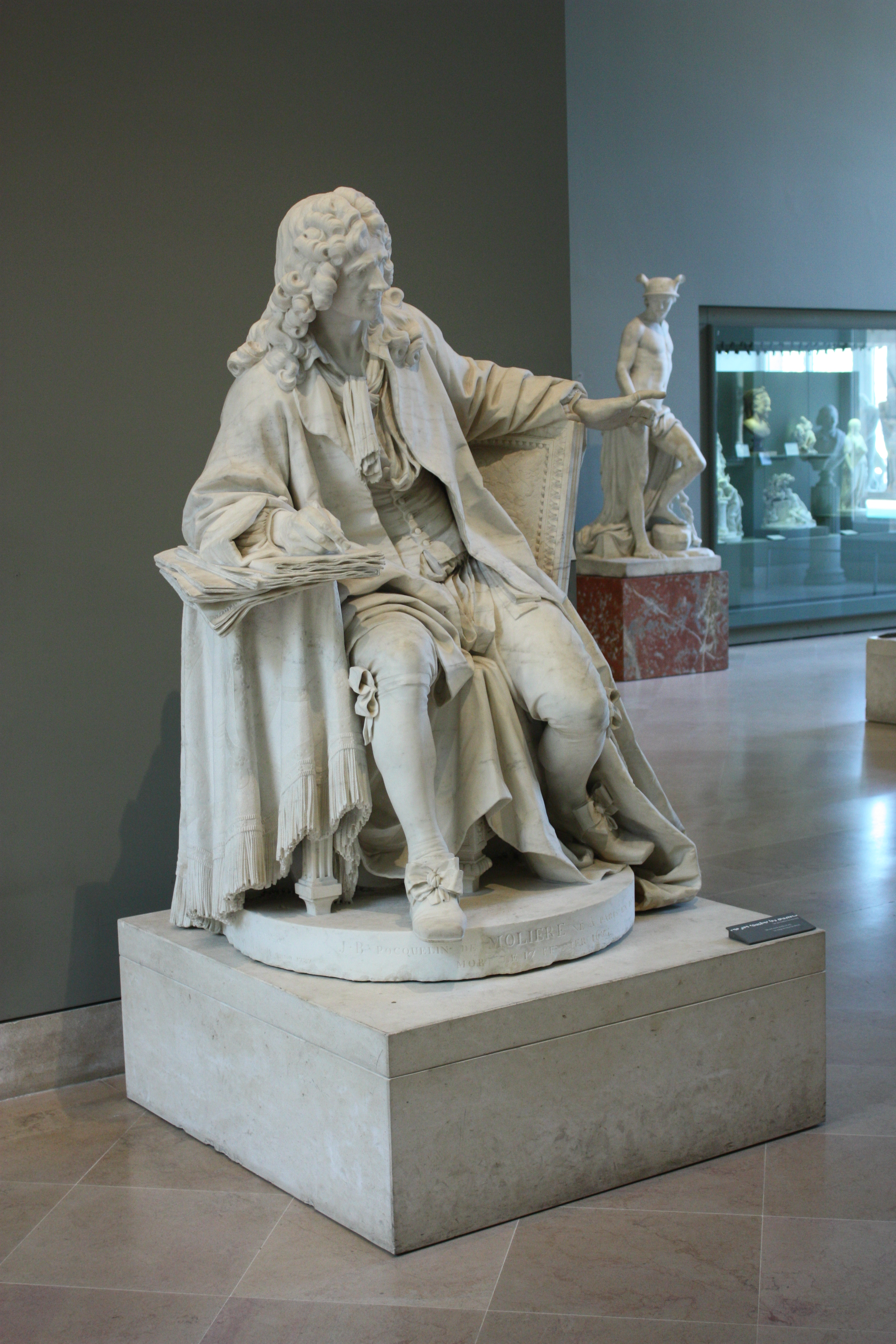
Jean-Jacques Caffieri, Portrait of Jean-Baptiste Poquelin, better known as Molière (1622-1673). Marble, exhibited at the Salon of 1787. Department of Sculptures, Richelieu wing, ground floor, room 29, The Louvre, Paris

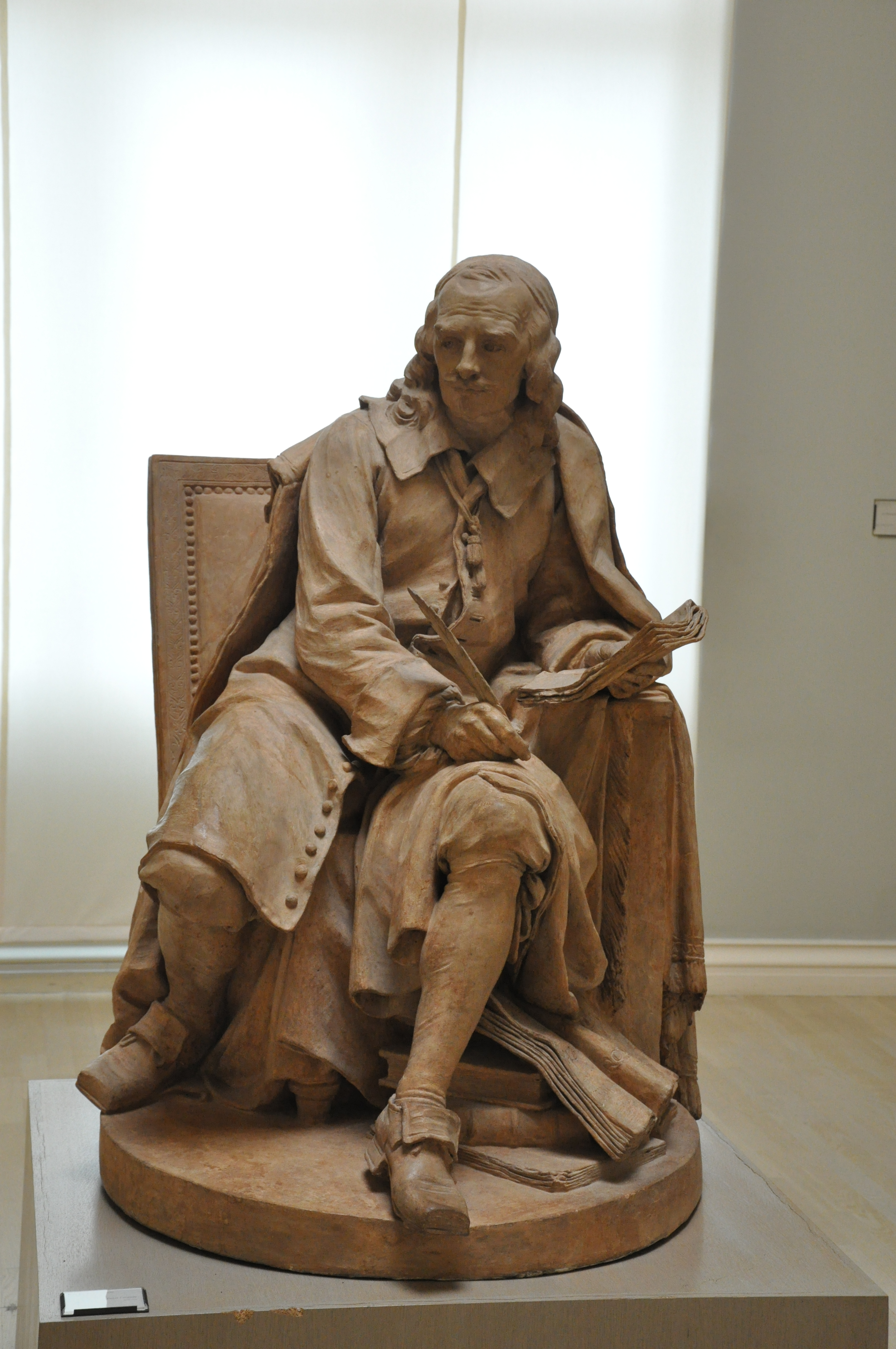
Jean-Jacques Caffieri, ca.1779, Pierre Corneille, 140 cm x 92 cm, terracotta, Musée des Beaux-Arts de Rouen, Normandy, France

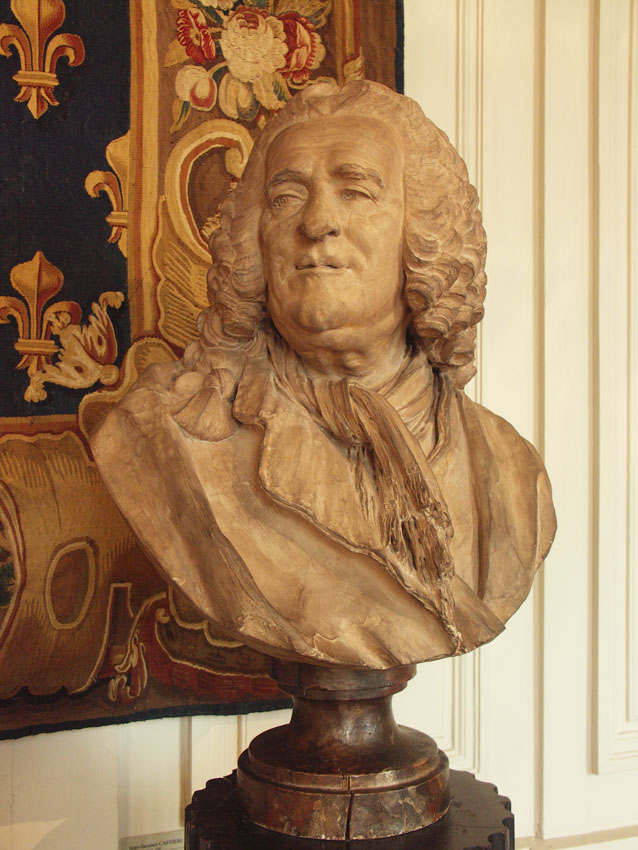
Jean-Jacques Caffieri, ca.1762, Alexis Piron, Musée des Beaux-Arts de Dijon, Dijon, France

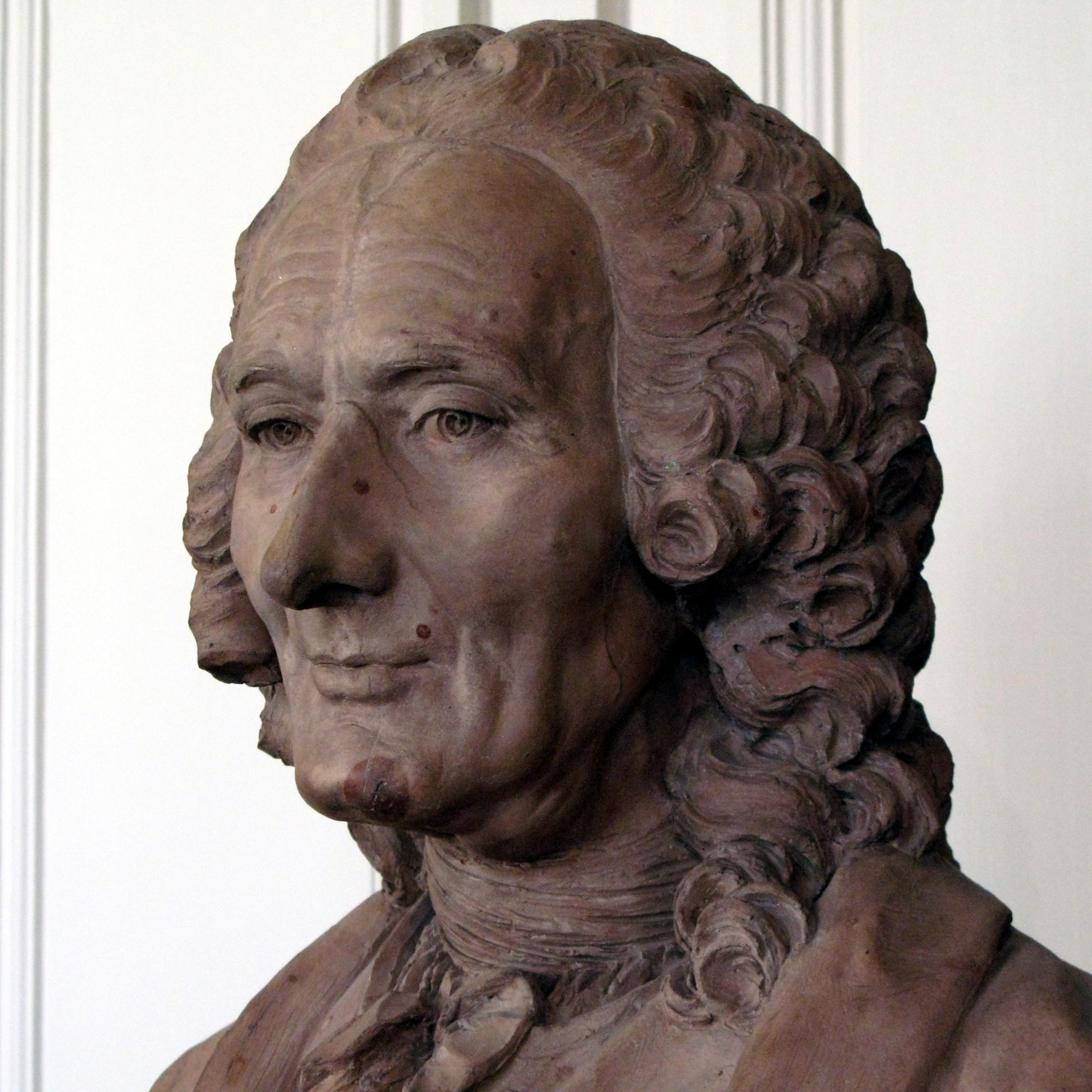
Jean-Jacques Caffieri, ca.1760, Jean-Philippe Rameau, Musée des Beaux-Arts de Dijon, Dijon, France

== Sources ==
- Extract from Jal's biographical dictionary
