= Winthrop Kellogg Edey =

American horologist and collector

- Born: 1938; Upper Brookville, New York
- Died: 1999 (Age 61); New York City
- Occupations: Collector, scholar
- Years active: 1960–1999
- Known for: Scholarship of clocks

Winthrop Kellogg "Kelly" Edey (1938–1999) was a noted collector and horologist who lived in Manhattan, New York. His well-regarded collection of timepieces is now in the Frick Collection. Edey is the subject of several Screen Tests by Andy Warhol and early Screen Tests likely were filmed at his Manhattan townhouse.

== Life and career ==
Through his mother's family, Kelly was an heir of Morris W. Kellogg, founder of a major engineering and petroleum services company. He grew up in Upper Brookville, New York on Long Island and graduated from Amherst College. His father, Maitland A. Edey, was an author and editor of Time-Life Books; his mother Helen Kellogg Edey was a psychiatrist and activist in the field of women's reproductive rights.

Over five decades, beginning when he was a boy, Edey assembled a significant collection of clocks, watches and associated research materials that he donated to the Frick after his death. He was a noted scholar of timepieces, and he executed repairs on his collection. Edey wrote the catalog to the 1982 Frick exhibition French Clocks in North American Collections. His bequest to the Frick includes 39 timepieces, including André Charles Boulle's famed Barometer Clock, with his library of horological and other materials. Edey also collected and conducted research in other areas, notably Egyptology and classical literature. He gave several works to the Metropolitan Museum of Art when he died, including sculptures by Augustus Saint-Gaudens.

Edey was gay and part of New York City's cultural and artistic life; he was friendly with Robert Mapplethorpe and Andy Warhol. Warhol's first Screen Tests likely were filmed at Edey's townhouse on West 83rd Street, Manhattan. Edey appears in several Screen Tests as well as some versions of the Screen Test compilation Thirteen Most Beautiful Boys. He kept a diary that extensively documents his life in New York City and elsewhere over several decades, which has been described as "Proustian in its sweep and attention to detail." The diary is in the collection of the Frick, but it is not available to the public.

== Selected publications ==
- Edey, Winthrop (1968). French Clocks. London: Littlehampton Book Services, Ltd. ISBN 9780289370568.
- Edey, Winthrop (1982). French Clocks in North American Collections, exh. cat. New York: The Frick Collection. ISBN 978-0912114118.
