= Maitland A. Edey =

American author and naturalist

Maitland Edey (1910–1992) was an American author and naturalist who was best known for his 1981 book Lucy: The Beginnings of Humankind which he co-wrote with paleoanthropologist Donald Johanson. The book was awarded the National Book Award in the science category. The book explains human evolution interspersed with accounts of Johanson's discoveries of fossils of early human ancestors. The narrative documents Johanson's most famous discovery in 1974 in present-day Ethiopia; when he found the remains of a 3 million year old early human hominin from the species Australopithecus afarensis. The fossil, at the time the oldest and most complete example of an early human ancestor, became known worldwide as Lucy.

Reviewing Lucy in the New York Times, science writer Boyce Rensberger stated that Johanson and Edey explained technical aspects of human evolution adroitley, allowing the lay-person to understand the subject easily. Regarding the book's explanatory style of human evolution, Rensberger stated: "This clarity makes the difference between simply having to swallow a given version of the human evolution story and being able to understand it." The book was also notable for documenting the academic, and sometimes personal rivalry between Johanson and Richard Leakey.

Edey graduated from Princeton University in 1932. He worked as a book editor after graduation and wrote two books on ornithology. He served in the US Army Air Forces during World War II as an intelligence officer and was discharged in 1945 as a major. From 1945 to 1956 he served as an editor for Life (magazine). From 1960 to 1972 he served as an editor for Time-Life Books, with the first 6 years serving as an editor of the Nature series, and the latter 6 years servings as editor-in-chief of the entire division. He wrote 11 books throughout his career, including books about American songbirds and waterbirds, human evolution, and large predator cats of Africa.

Edey was a sailor on the Mayflower II, a replica of the Mayflower, which sails from Plymouth, England to Plymouth, Massachusetts, recreating the historical journey of the Pilgrims on the original ship.

Edey died in 1992 at Martha's Vineyard, Massachusetts, from a brain bleed. Edey was the father of watch and clock collector Winthrop Kellogg Edey.
