= Barometer Clock =

17th century clock by André-Charles Boulle

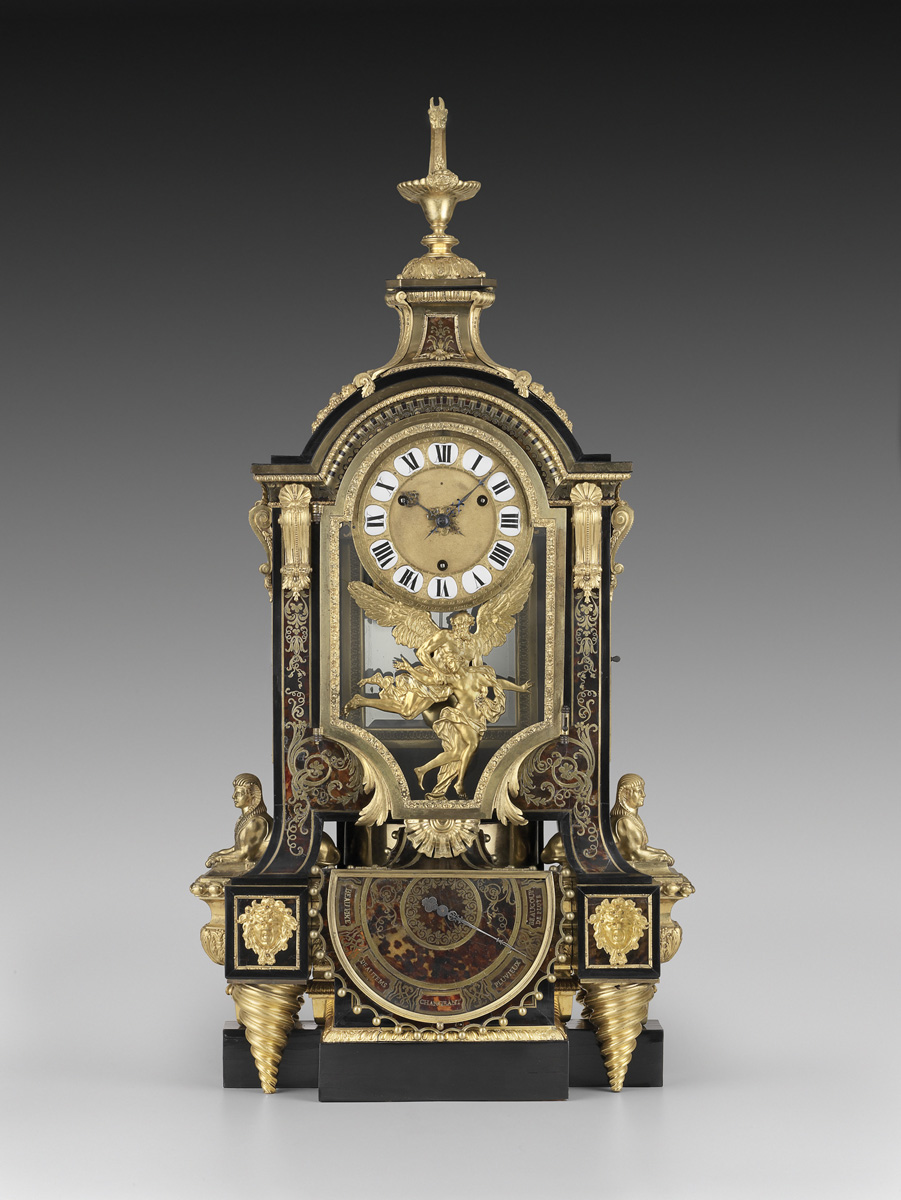
- Artist: Case by: André-Charles Boulle (1642 - 1732); Movement by: Isaac Thuret (1630 - 1706); Movement by: or Jacques Thuret (1669 - 1738)
- Year: c. 1690–1700
- Medium: Ebony, turtle shell, brass, gilt bronze, and enamel
- Dimensions: 45 1/4 x 23 1/8 x 10 1/4 in. (114.9 x 58.7 x 26 cm)
- Website: collections.frick.org/view/objects/asitem/items$0040:1562

Barometer Clock (Boulle) by André-Charles Boulle is a late seventeenth-century French clock created out of ebony, turtle shell, brass, gilt bronze, and enamel. The clock case is decorated on all sides and was intended as either a centerpiece or for display on a mantel in front of a mirror. The centerpiece of the clock is a relief of "Father Time unveiling Truth."

This late seventeenth-century clock also functions as a barometer; the "two doors on the rear of the clock open to reveal a glass tube containing mercury and a float to which thread is attached." The semicircular barometer dial indicates five weather conditions from one extreme, beaucoup de pluye (rainy), to the other, beau fixe (fine).

Boulle, who gave his name to the type of veneering on this clock, is listed in the French Archives Nationales as a cabinet maker, maker of marquetry, and gilder and chaser of bronzes.

The clock movement design is by either Isaac Thuret or his son Jacques Thuret. The dial and backplate of the movement are both signed "I. Thuret...", the character I and J being interchangeable during the period.

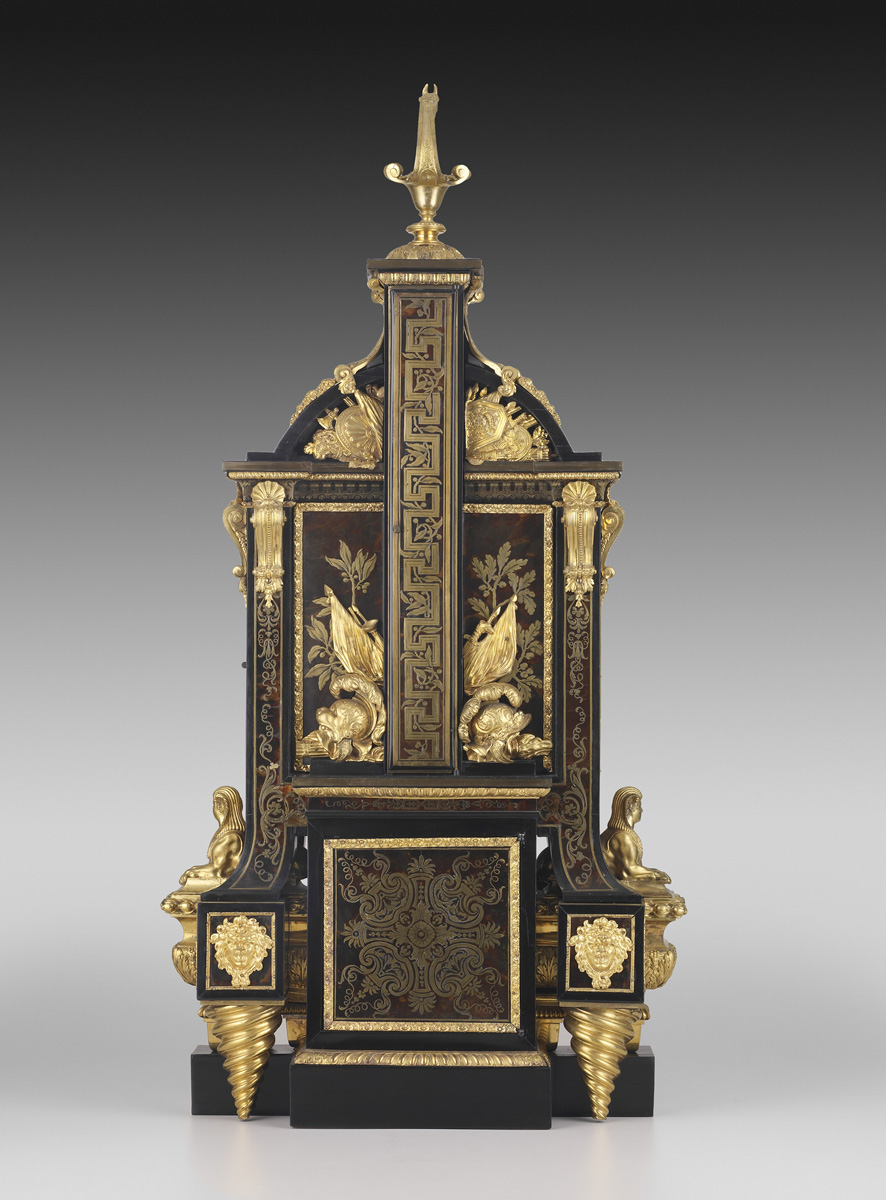
Barometer Clock (Boulle) back

== Acquisition ==
The Barometer Clock was acquired by the Frick Collection through the bequest of New York collector Winthrop Kellogg Edey in 1999. Edey's bequest included twenty-five clocks and fourteen watches as well as his library and archives.

== Exhibition ==
- "Magnificent Timekeepers: An Exhibition of Northern European Clocks in New York Collections,” 1972, Metropolitan Museum of Art.
- "French Clocks in North American Collections," November 2, 1982 - January 30, 1983, The Frick Collection.
- "The Art of the Timekeeper: Masterpieces from the Winthrop Edey Bequest," November 14, 2001 - February 24, 2002, The Frick Collection.

== See also ==
- André-Charles Boulle
- Thuret family
