= Jacques Caffieri =

French sculptor (1678–1755)

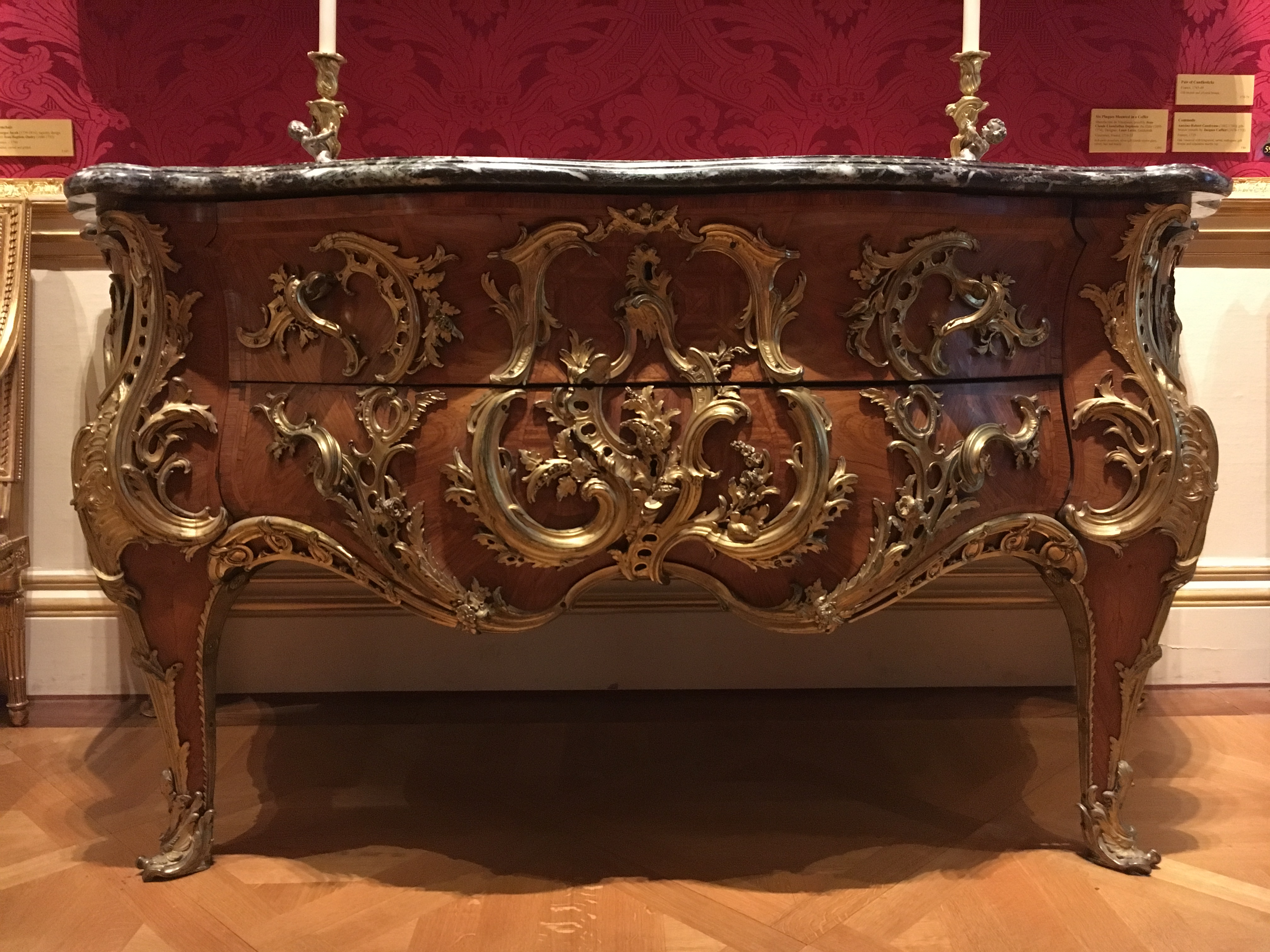
1739 commode by Antoine Gaudreau with gilt-bronze mounts by Caffieri. Made for Louis XV's bedchamber at Versailles, now in the Wallace Collection

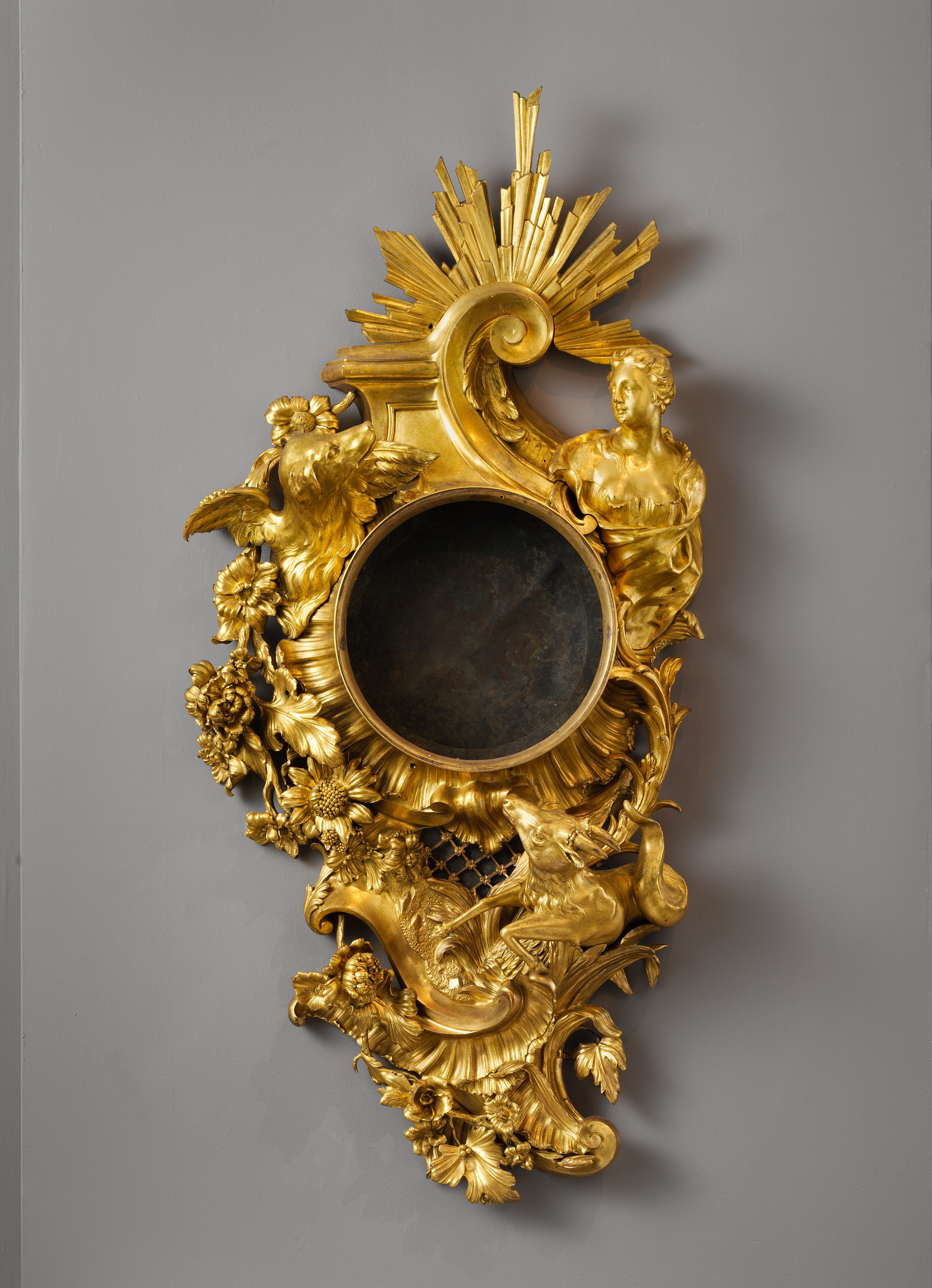
Wall clock case by Caffieri, circa 1745–49, from the Metropolitan Museum of Art collection

Pair of 1752 gilt-bronze andirons by Caffieri, in the Cleveland Museum of Art

Jacques Caffieri (25 August 1678, Paris – 25 November 1755, Paris) was a French rococo sculptor, working for the most part in bronze.

== Life ==
Jacques Caffiéri was the fifth son of Philippe Caffieri (1634-1716), the founder of this family of artists. Jacques was received a maître fondeur-ciseleur by 1715, the date of his first known work, a design for a pall for the Corporation des Fondeurs-Ciseleurs, one of two Parisian guilds that oversaw works cast in metal, from full-scale sculptures to gilt-bronze furniture mounts, wall-lights and candlesticks. As fondeurs-ciseleurs, "casters and finishers", the renown of the Caffieri family has centred on Jacques, though later it is not easy to distinguish between Jacques' work and that of Jacques' son, the younger Philippe (1714–1777).

Caffieri was attached as fondeur-ciseleur to the Bâtiments du Roi in 1736. He did much of his work for the crown at Versailles, Fontainebleau, Marly, Compiègne, Choisy and the Château de La Muette. The crown, ever in his debt, still owed him money at his death. Philippe and his son Jacques worked together in the Appartement du Dauphin at Versailles, and although much of their contribution has disappeared, the gilt-bronze decorations of the marble chimney-piece still remain.

After the elder Philippe's death in 1716, Jacques continued to work for the crown, but had many private clients. From the Caffieri workshop in rue des Canettes came an amazing amount of work, chiefly in the shape of those gilt-bronze furniture mounts which adorned furniture by the best ébénistes of Paris. Little of his achievement was ordinary; an astonishingly large proportion of it is famous. In the Wallace Collection, London, is the royal commode delivered by Antoine-Robert Gaudreau, ébéniste du Roi, in 1739 for Louis XV's bedchamber at Versailles: it is richly mounted with an integrated series of corner mounts, chutes and sabots, and the drawer-fronts and a single composition into which the handles are fully integrated. It must have been the result of close cooperation between Caffiéri and Gaudreau, who was responsible for the veneered carcase. In 1747 Caffiéri supplied gilt-bronze mounts for the marble chimneypiece in the Dauphin's bedroom at Versailles. Caffieri also produced gilt-bronze cases for clocks, both mantel clocks and the cartel clocks that combined clock and bracket in one unified design, to be mounted on a wall. A detailed inventory of the Caffieri workshop made in 1747 enables scholars to identify some unsigned clockcases from the workshop: a fully Rococo cartel clock with a movement by Julien Le Roy is at the Getty Museum: it is inscribed fait par Caffiery in a cartouche below the dial.

In 1740, Caffieri's wife purchased a royal privilege, which allowed the Caffieri workshop to gild bronze as well as cast it within the same workshop; ordinarily the processes were divided between two Parisian corporations, jealous of their jurisdictions, the fondeurs-ciseleurs and the ciseleurs-doreurs.

His signature incised in gilt-bronze kept his name alive in the nineteenth century and gained him an entry in Encyclopædia Britannica 1911, though the extreme Rococo style of which he was a consummate master laid his work open to disapproving commentary. Two monumental gilt-bronze chandeliers in the Wallace Collection, London, bear his signature; one of them was a wedding present from Louis XV to Louise-Elisabeth of France in 1739; the other is signed and dated 1751. The famous astronomical clock made by C.-S. Passement and Dauthiau for Louis XV, 1749–1753, is housed in a Rococo case signed by Caffieri. Another clock, with a movement by Balthasar Martinot in an extreme Rococo style gilt-bronze case, belongs to the Duke of Buccleuch, at Boughton House A pair of fire-dogs signed and dated 1752 is in the Cleveland Museum of Art Two large gilt-bronze mirror-frames by Caffieri, to a design by Ange-Jacques Gabriel, were intended as a gift to the Sultan of Turkey; the price was an astonishing 24,982 livres.

He made a great cross and six candlesticks for the high altar of Notre-Dame de Paris, which disappeared in the French Revolution, but similar work for Bayeux Cathedral still exists. A wonderful enamelled toilet set which he executed for the Princess of Asturias has also disappeared.

In 1737 and 1735 respectively, Jacques Caffieri cast the busts of Jean Victor de Besenval de Brunstatt (1671–1736) and of his late father, Jean Victor Pierre Joseph Besenval (1638–1713). The busts, at least one of which was part of the collection of Pierre Victor, Baron de Besenval de Brunstatt, according to Louis Abel de Bonafous, Abbé de Fontenay (1737–1806), it was the bust that showed the baron's father, Jean Victor de Besenval de Brunstatt, and which the baron kept in his cabinet at the Hôtel de Besenval, were both shown at the exhibition L’Art Français sous Louis XIV et sous Louis XV, which was held in Paris in 1888.

== Sons ==
Jacques Caffiéri was joined in the workshop by his son, the younger Philippe Caffiéri (1714–1774), who also was received as a maître fondeur-ciseleur and who sometimes signed his independent works, especially after the death of his father in 1755, P.CAFFIERI. The younger Philippe's style was gradually modified by the new taste for Neoclassicism. Like his father, he drew large sums from the crown, usually after giving many years credit, while many other years were needed by his heirs to get in the balance of the royal indebtedness.

Philippe's younger brother, Jean-Jacques Caffieri (1725–1792), was a sculptor, appointed sculpteur du Roi to Louis XV and later afforded lodgings in the Galeries du Louvre. He designed the fine rampe d'escalier which still adorns the Palais Royal. He is better known for his portrait busts, in terracotta or marble: his bust of Madame du Barry is at the Hermitage Museum, St Petersburg. He made a name with his busts of Pierre Corneille and Jean Racine for the foyer of the Comédie Française.
