= Bureau Mazarin =

17th-century desk form

The bureau Mazarin is a 17th-century desk form named after Cardinal Mazarin, who was the Chief minister of France from 1642 to 1661. It is the earliest predecessor of the pedestal desk and differs from it by having only two tiers of drawers or three tiers of rather small drawers under the desktop surface, followed by eight legs supporting the whole. Also, the bureau Mazarin has cross braces between the legs, forming two Xs or two Hs on each side.

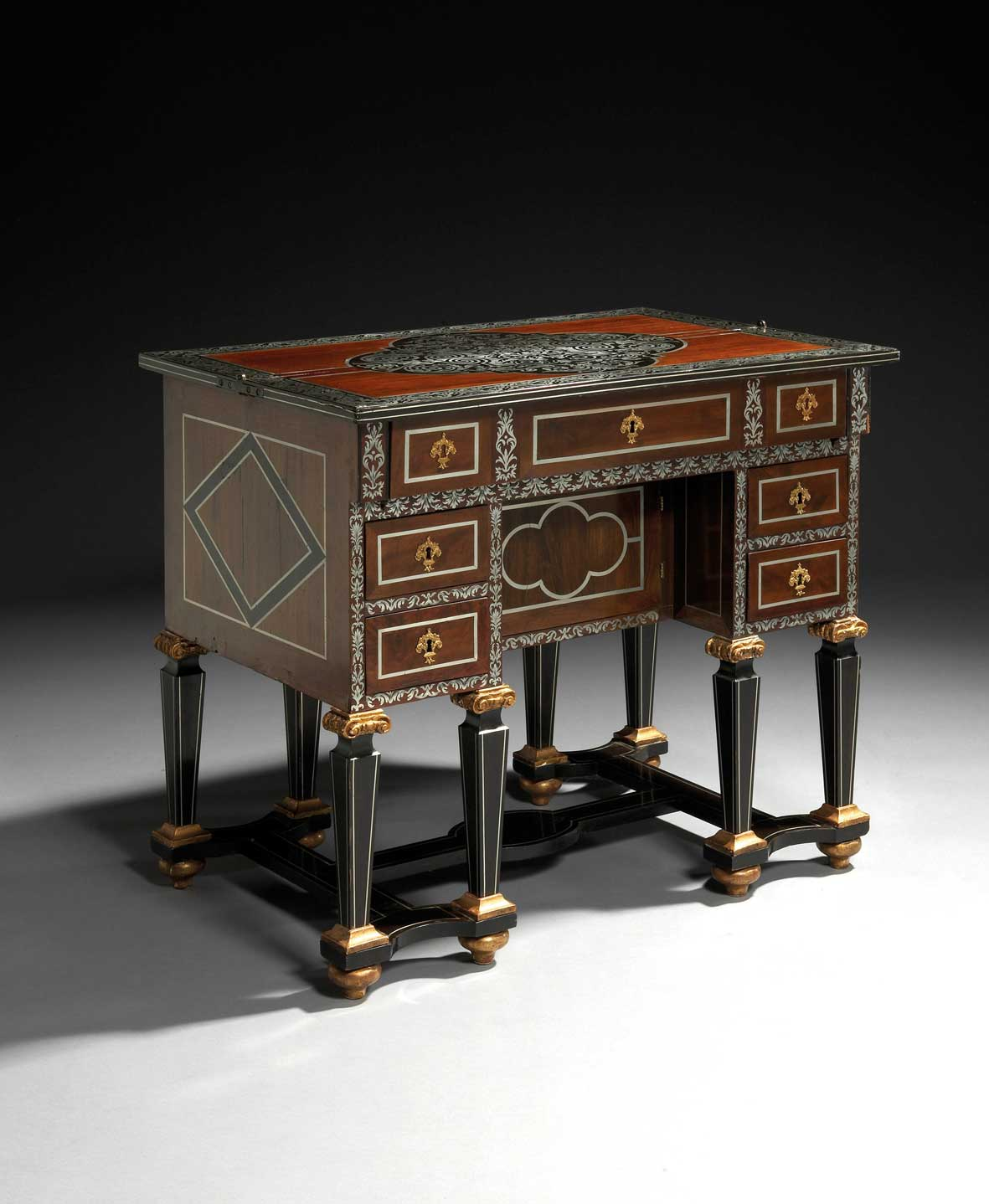
bureau Mazarin

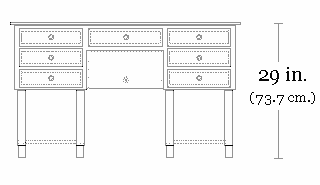
bureau Mazarin (front view)

A bureau Mazarin is usually a kneehole desk, in that it is meant to be used sideways, with one knee only beneath the work surface. The kneehole desk was designed in an age where only the nobility, or those who followed its customs closely, could afford to have such desks made. Members of the nobility often wore a ceremonial or practical sword, which was forever in the way. It was thus easier to use a desk sideways, with only one knee under it. The rest of the space next to the knee often served as a lockable storage space.

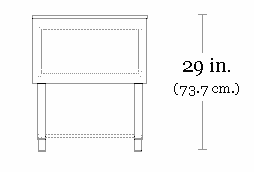
bureau Mazarin (side view)

As was often the case with many desks of the period, the bureau Mazarin was often used as a dressing table instead of serving as a desk, or was used for both functions.

As with the Kunstschrank of the lands of the Holy Roman Empire, the desk was sometimes more of a status symbol than a useful piece of furniture.

== See also ==
- List of desk forms and types.

== Bibliography ==
- De Reyniès, Nicole. Le Mobilier Domestique: Vocabulaire Typologique. Paris: Ministère de la Culture et de La Communication, 1987.
- Payne, Christopher, ed.. Sotheby's Concise Encyclopedia of Furniture. London: Conran Octopus, 1989.
- Romand, Didier. L'argus des meubles. Paris: Balland, 1976.
