= Jean Bérain the Younger =

French designer (1678–1726)

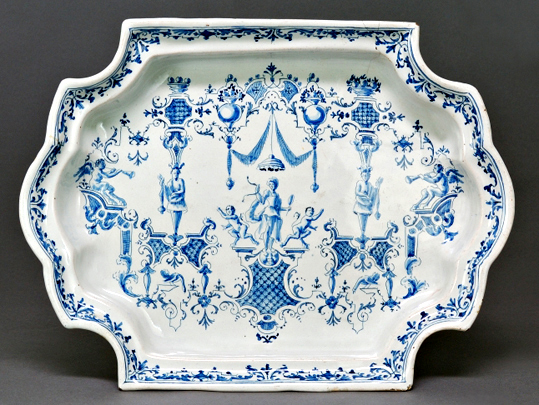
Bérainesque grotesque decor on an 18th-century faience plate from Turin

Jean Bérain the Younger (1678 in Paris–1726 in Paris) was a French designer, and son of Jean Bérain the Elder.

He was his father's pupil, and exercised the same official functions after his father's death. Thus he planned the funeral ceremonies at Saint Denis Basilica on the death of the Dauphin, and afterwards made the designs for the obsequies of Louis XIV.

He was perhaps best known as an engraver. He engraved eleven plates of the collection Ornements de peinture et de sculpture qui sont dans la galerie d'Apollon au chasteau du Louvre, et dans le grand appartement du roy au palais des Tuileries (Paris, 1710), which have been wrongly attributed to his father, the Mausolée du duc de Bourgogne, and that of Marie Louise Gabrielle de Savoie, reine d'Espagne (1714), etc. His work is exceedingly difficult to distinguish from his father's, the similarity of style being remarkable.
