= Philippe Caffieri (1634–1716) =

Italian sculptor

Filippo Caffieri (1634–1716), known as Philippe Caffieri, was an Italian decorative sculptor, active mainly in France.

He was born in Rome to an aristocratic family originally from Naples. After briefly serving Pope Alexander VII, was brought to France by Cardinal Mazarin and entered the service of King Louis XIV in 1660. He installed him in the same building as the Gobelins Manufactory, engaged in decorative, design, and engineering work for the French crown. He married the sister of the king's painter, Charles Le Brun. He was the first in a family of sculptors, his sons and descendants would form the prolific Caffieri family of sculptors active mainly for the French court.

== Children ==
- François-Charles Philippe Caffieri (Francesco Carlo Caffieri) (1667–1721), eldest son, associated with his father's work and sculptor for ships
- Jacques, fifth son with disability

== Sources ==
- Boni, Filippo de' (1852). Biografia degli artisti ovvero dizionario della vita e delle opere dei pittori, degli scultori, degli intagliatori, dei tipografi e dei musici di ogni nazione che fiorirono da'tempi più remoti sino á nostri giorni. Seconda Edizione.. Venice; Googlebooks: Presso Andrea Santini e Figlio. p. 164.
