= Jean Bérain the Elder =

French royal artist (1640–1711)

- Born: 1640; Saint-Mihiel, Spanish Netherlands
- Died: 24 January 1711 (aged 70–71)
- Occupations: Draughtsman, designer, painter, engraver
- Children: Jean Bérain the Younger

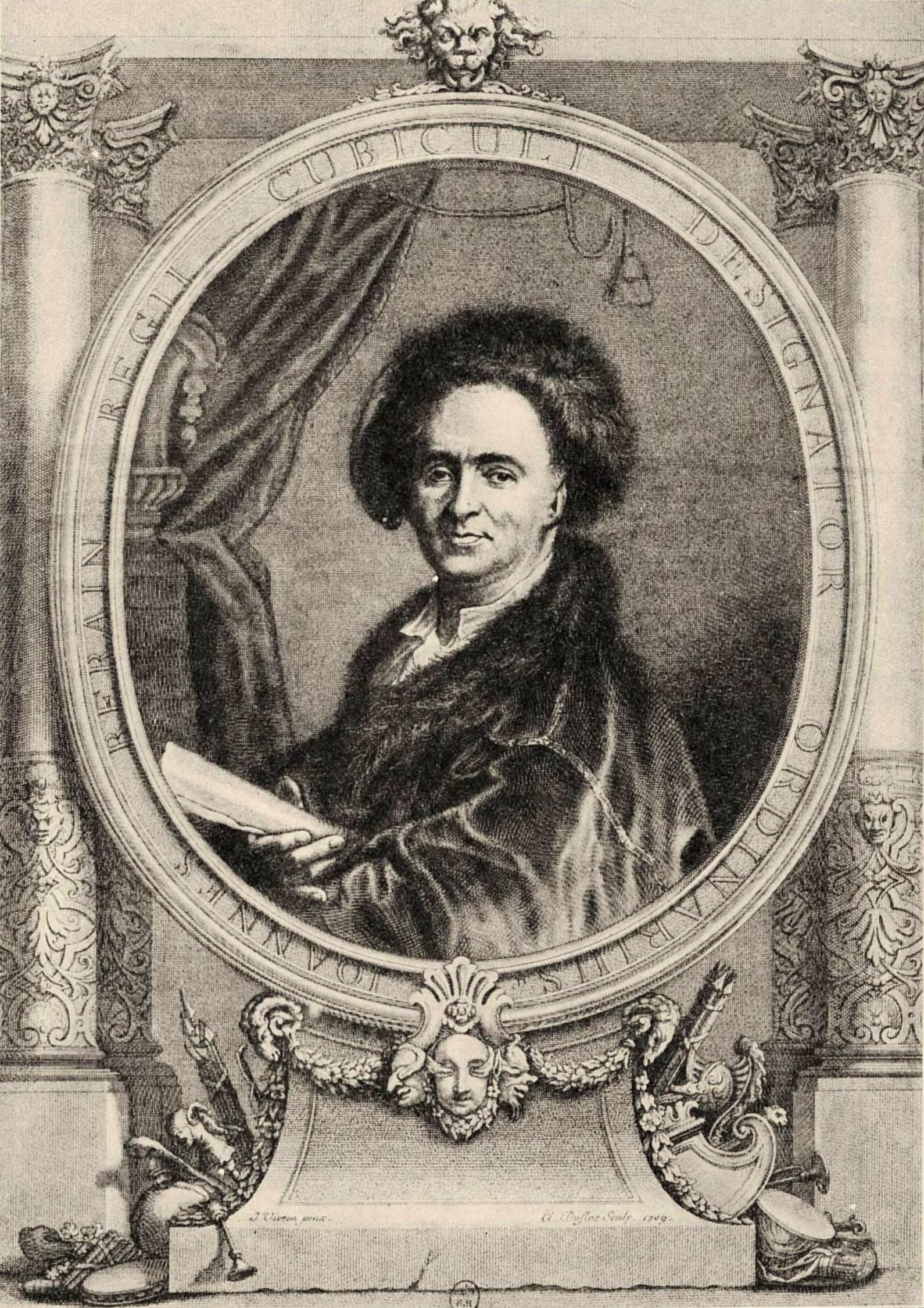
Portrait of Bérain, engraving by Claude Duflos after Joseph Vivien

Jean Bérain the Elder (1640 – 24 January 1711) was a draughtsman and designer, painter and engraver of ornament, the artistic force in the Royal office of the Menus-Plaisirs du Roi where all the designs originated for court spectacle, from fêtes to funerals, and many designs for furnishings not covered by the Bâtiments du Roi. The "Berainesque" style of light arabesques and playful grotesques was an essential element in the style Régence that led to the French Rocaille and European Rococo.

== Biography ==
Born in Saint-Mihiel, Meuse, in the Spanish Netherlands, he was the son of a master gunsmith, in whose line of work engraving was a prominent technique. He spent his career in Paris. Long after his death the connoisseur Pierre-Jean Mariette wrote of him, "Nothing was done, in whatever genre that it might have been, unless it were in his manner, or where he had given designs for it." Through his engravings and those of his son, his style was highly influential beyond the court and Paris, notably in the Low Countries, Germany and London. His close friendship with Nicodemus Tessin the Younger ensured that Berain's own nuance in the Louis XIV style was transmitted to court circles in Sweden.

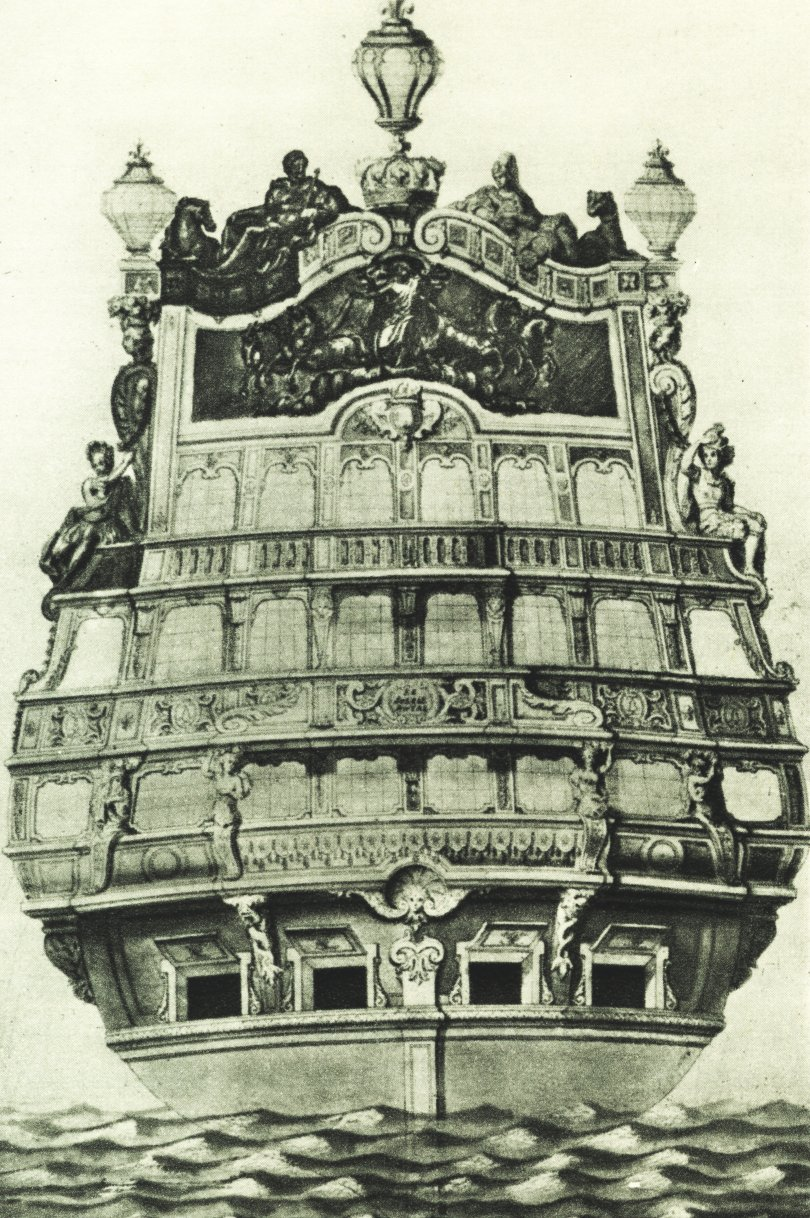
Transom of the Soleil Royal, Louvre, 1670

Berain was established in Paris by 1663. On 28 December 1674 he was appointed dessinateur de la Chambre et du cabinet du Roi (designer of the king's chamber and office) in the Menus-Plaisirs (a post he retained until his death), in succession to Henri de Gissey, whose pupil he is believed to have been. From 1677 onward he had workrooms and an apartment in the Galeries du Louvre near to those of André Charles Boulle, for whom he made many designs for furniture. After the death of Charles Le Brun Berain was commissioned to compose and supervise the whole of the exterior decoration of the king's ships. His first designs for royal interiors date from the years 1682–1684.

He was inventive and industrious, and, beginning with interiors at the Hôtel de Mailly (1687–88) assimilated and adapted Raphaelesque grotesque ornament to the taste of the time. He provided arabesque designs for the manufacture of Beauvais tapestry. At Meudon for Louis, le Grand Dauphin, whose favourite designer he remained. Berain's decors, beginning in 1699, initiated the Régence style that was a precursor of the Rococo.

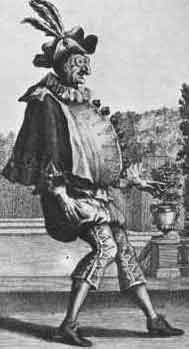
Costume design for Pulcinella (1703)

Bérain also designed for the theatre. By 1674 he had already begun designing costumes for Jean-Baptiste Lully's Opéra, including costumes for dancers in the divertissements. For Lully's 1684 opera Amadis, a tale of chivalric romance, Bérain carried out research into the styles of the Middle Ages and the Renaissance, a historical approach to costume design that was unusual for the time. Besides costume designs for Lully's tragédies en musique, Bérain designed the costumes for Lully's ballets Le triomphe de l'amour (1681) and Le temple de la paix (1685).

In 1680 he additionally took over Carlo Vigarani's work as the designer of the Opéra's stage machinery and scenery, and until 1707 he was in charge of staging all lyric works produced at the Théâtre du Palais-Royal in Paris as well as at the royal residences. After Lully's death in 1687, he created designs for the earliest opéra-ballets, Pascal Colasse's Les saisons (1695) and André Campra's L'Europe galante (1697). In his set designs Bérain continued using highly symmetrical single-point perspective, following in the footsteps of his Italian predecessors Giacomo Torelli and Vigarani, as well as Giovanni Francesco Grimaldi and Giovanni Burnacini. He never employed the per angolo (oblique) perspective designs that were being tried in Italy by designers such as the Galli-Bibienas.

In 1692 it was Bérain who worked with the Royal Family on the occasion of the marriage of Philippe d'Orléans to the king's illegitimate daughter Françoise-Marie de Bourbon, Mademoiselle de Blois. Bérain designed their jewelled wedding clothes and their private apartments at the Palais-Royal in the Capital.

His numerous designs were for the most part engraved under his own supervision; a collection of them was published in Paris in 1711 by his son-in-law, Jacques Thuret, clockmaker to the king from 1694. There are three books, L'Œuvre de J. Berain, Ornements inventés par J. Berain and Œuvres de J. Berain contenant des ornements d'architecture.`

Désiré Guilmard in Les Maîtres ornemanistes, gives a complete list of his published works.

His son and pupil, Jean Berain the Younger (1678–1726), was born and died in Paris. He exercised the same official functions after his father's death and worked in a very similar taste.
