= Philippe Caffieri (1714–1774) =

French sculptor

Philippe Caffiéri (1714–1774) was a French sculptor. The son of Jacques Caffieri, he was received as a maître fondeur-ciseleur, joined his father's workshop and sometimes signed his independent works, especially after the death of his father in 1755, P.CAFFIERI. The younger Philippe's style was gradually modified by the new taste for Neoclassicism. Like his father, he drew large sums from the crown, usually after giving many years credit, while many other years were needed by his heirs to get in the balance of the royal indebtedness.
