= Mathieu Criaerd =

French master cabinetmaker

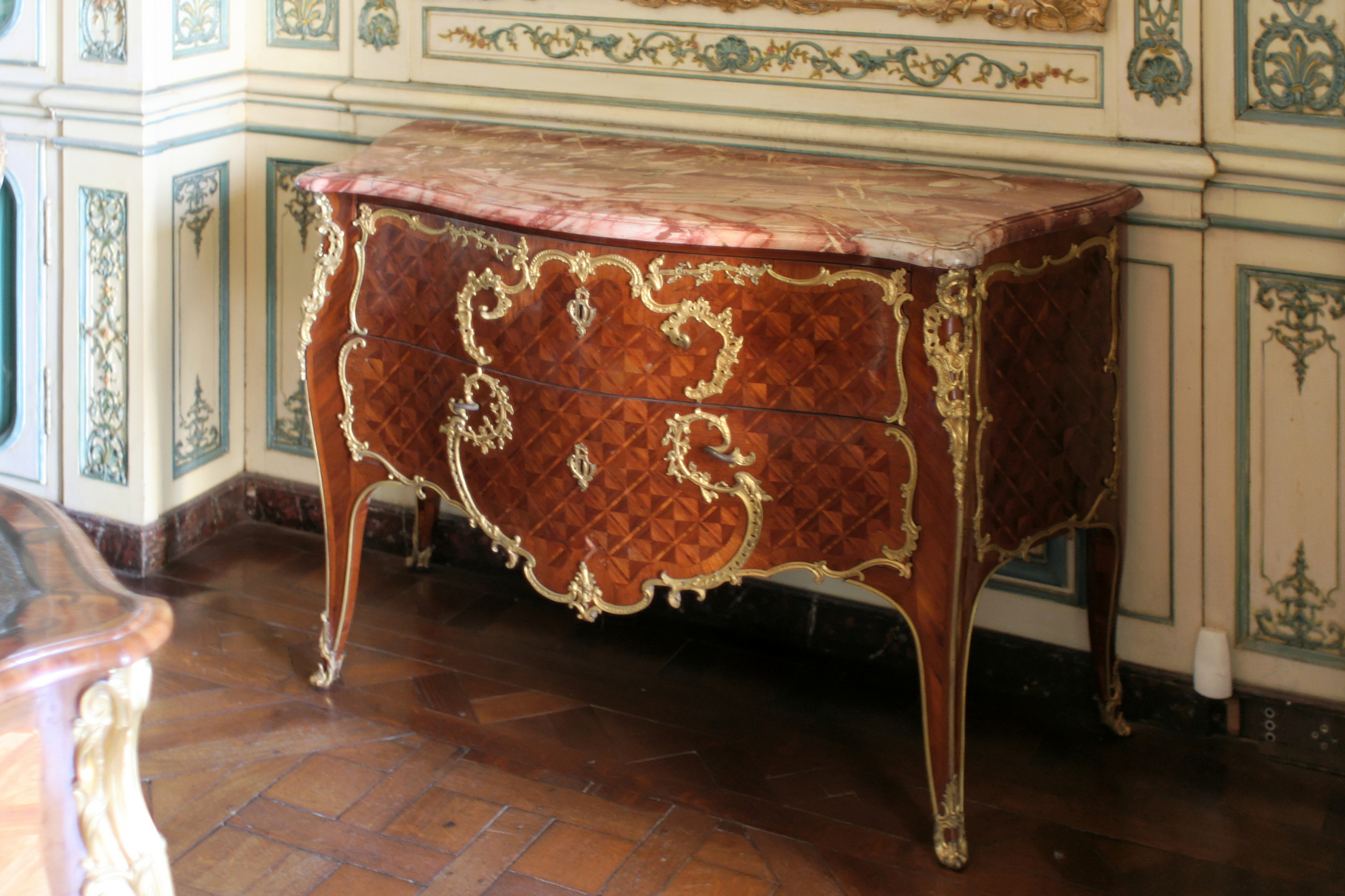
Commode stamped by Criaerd, delivered by the marchand-mercier Hébert, 29 January 1748, in the library of the Appartement du Dauphin, Versailles

Mathieu Criaerd (1689–1776) was the most prominent of a large family of cabinetmakers (ébénistes), apparently of Flemish ancestry, who were working in Paris during the 18th century. He became a master in the Corporation des Menuisiers-Ébénistes 29 July 1738 and set up his workshop in the rue Traversière-Saint-Antoine, in the heart of the furniture-making district of Paris, using the stamp M CRIAERD.

Through the marchand-mercier Thomas-Joachim Hébert, Criaerd scored an early triumph for them both in 1743, with a commode and corner cabinets (encoignures) en suite, that were delivered on 20 January by Hébert for the use of Louis XV's mistress Mme de Mailly in her Blue Room at the Château de Choisy; it was decorated in vernis Martin in blue and white, with chinoiserie motifs, as if it were entirely made of Chinese porcelain, and its mounts, rather than being gilded, were silvered. Though in fact it was the painted decor that impressed, the sensational success of the set launched Hébert's career as a purveyor of refined furnishings and objets d'art to the court of Louis XV and doubtless brought Criaerd himself to the notice of wealthy clients.

Criaerd specialized in furniture veneered with Chinese lacquer or lacquered to imitate it, or with floral marquetry, with rococo mounts. On a number of occasions he supplied furniture carcasses to Jean-François Oeben's workshop, "a sufficient indication of his high standing", Francis Watson observed of Criaerd. His large production of lacquered commodes in an admittedly somewhat routine Louis XV manner elicited the observation from André Bouthemy, who was attempting to distinguish, in a Morellian technique, the recognizable workshop characteristics of a number of Parisian ébénistes, "There is no lack even of reputed artists worthy of interest in other respects, who sacrificed to facility commonplace productions: the Criaerds, Roussels and Delormes, for example, have carried out pieces of furniture that all blend together. The commode and corner cabinets delivered by Mathieur Criard for Mme de Mailly, mistress of Louis XV, are distinguished assuredly by the remarkable paintings with which they are covered, but their metal mounts are of widely available models, such as the hardware trade of the time produced." After his wife died in 1767, Criaerd made over the workshop to his younger son Sébastien-Mathieu Criaerd, known as "Criaerd le jeune", who expanded the commercial aspect of the venture as a dealer in furnishings, but continuing to stamp with his father's maindron, as was customary practice.
