= French furniture =

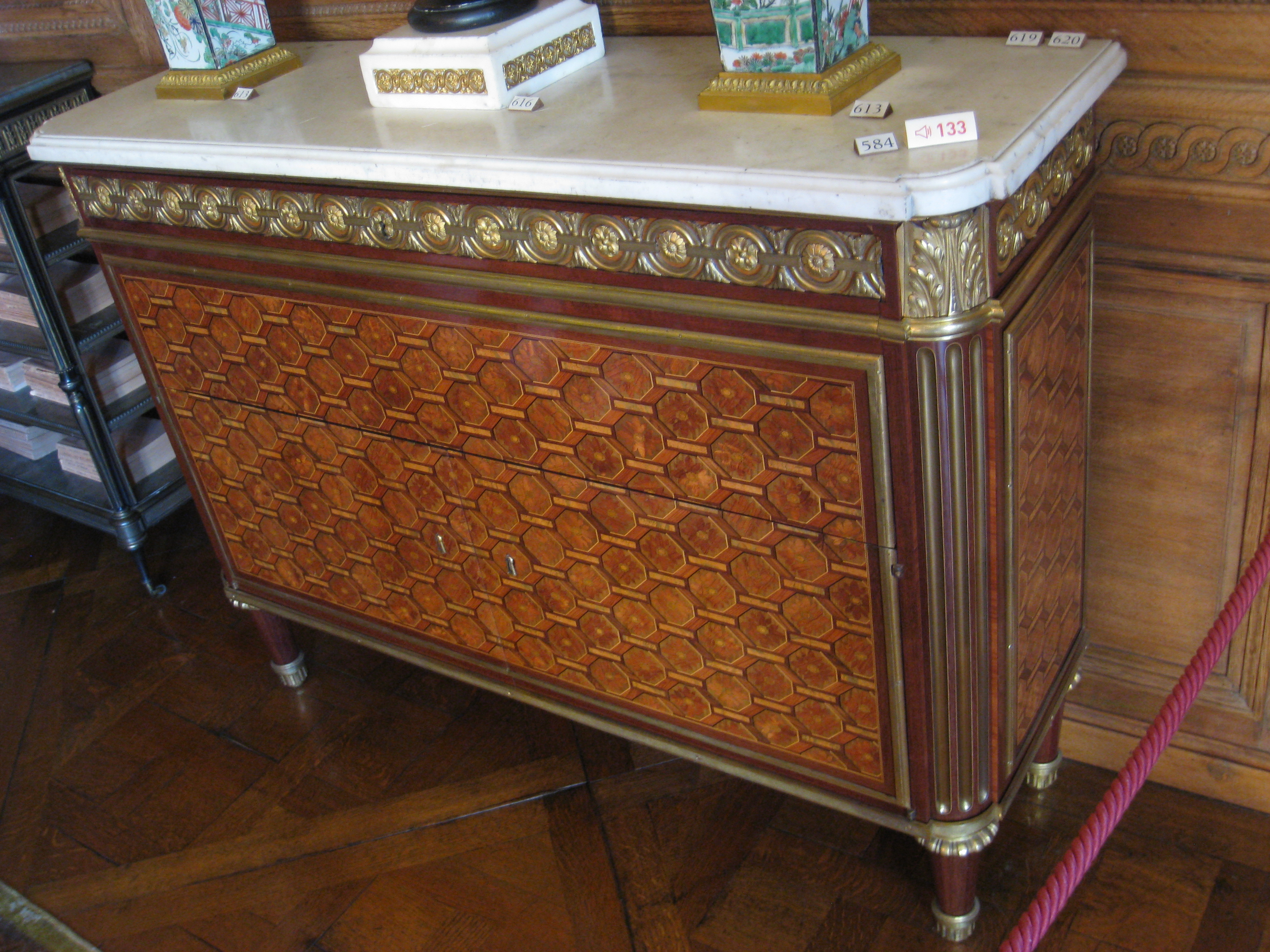
Secrétaire à abattant by Jean-François Leleu, Paris, ca 1770 (Musée Nissim de Camondo, Paris)

French furniture comprises both the most sophisticated furniture made in Paris for king and court, aristocrats and rich upper bourgeoisie, on the one hand, and French provincial furniture made in the provincial cities and towns many of which, like Lyon and Liège, retained cultural identities distinct from the metropolis. There was also a conservative artisanal rural tradition of French country furniture which remained unbroken until the advent of the railroads in the mid-nineteenth century.

== Provincial furniture ==
Furniture made in provincial centers such as Blois and Orléans in the Loire valley, and at Lyon or Liège (not part of France politically but within its cultural orbit), followed at some distance the design innovations that were initiated in the luxury trades of Paris, often with a time lag that could amount to decades.

Features typically associated with French Provincial furniture include cabriole legs, and simple scalloped carving. Dining chairs often have a wheat pattern carving reflecting the country surroundings of the maker. The ladder back chair with a woven rush seat is the typical French Provincial dining chair. Finishes vary though common to all colours is the accumulation of polish or grime in the carving over time resulting in an aged patina and emphasis on the carving regardless of whether the furniture is painted or stained.

== Parisian furniture ==
In the metropolitan culture of France, French furniture, connoting Parisian furniture, embodies one of the mainstreams of design in the decorative arts of Europe, extending its influence from Spain to Sweden and Russia, from the late seventeenth century to the last craft traditions in workshops like Jacques-Emile Ruhlmann, which came to an end only with the Second World War. In the nineteenth and twentieth centuries, French furniture of the classic period 1660-1815, has been collected as passionately by non-French amateurs, with the English in the historical lead, and has set record prices consistently, since the Hamilton Palace sale of 1882, with the result that it is represented in many national museums.

In Paris, an unbroken tradition of apprenticeship, already fully formed when the design center for luxury furnishings shifted from Antwerp to Paris in the 1630s, was slowly disrupted by the Industrial Revolution after the mid-nineteenth century. Perhaps the last of the Parisian ébénistes working from a traditional atelier was Émile-Jacques Ruhlmann (1879-1933).

== French royal furniture ==
The grand tradition of French royal furniture received its impetus from the establishment of the Manufacture royale des Gobelins under the organisation of the arts in the service of Louis XIV that was controlled and directed by his minister of finance, Colbert. Favoured craftsmen would be eligible for premises in the galleries of the Palais du Louvre, a practice that had been initiated on a small scale under Henri IV. At the Gobelins, much more than tapestry was made for the furnishing of the royal palaces and the occasional ambassadorial gift: the celebrated silver furnishings for the Galerie des Glaces at Versailles was produced by silversmiths working to designs by Charles Le Brun at the Gobelins.

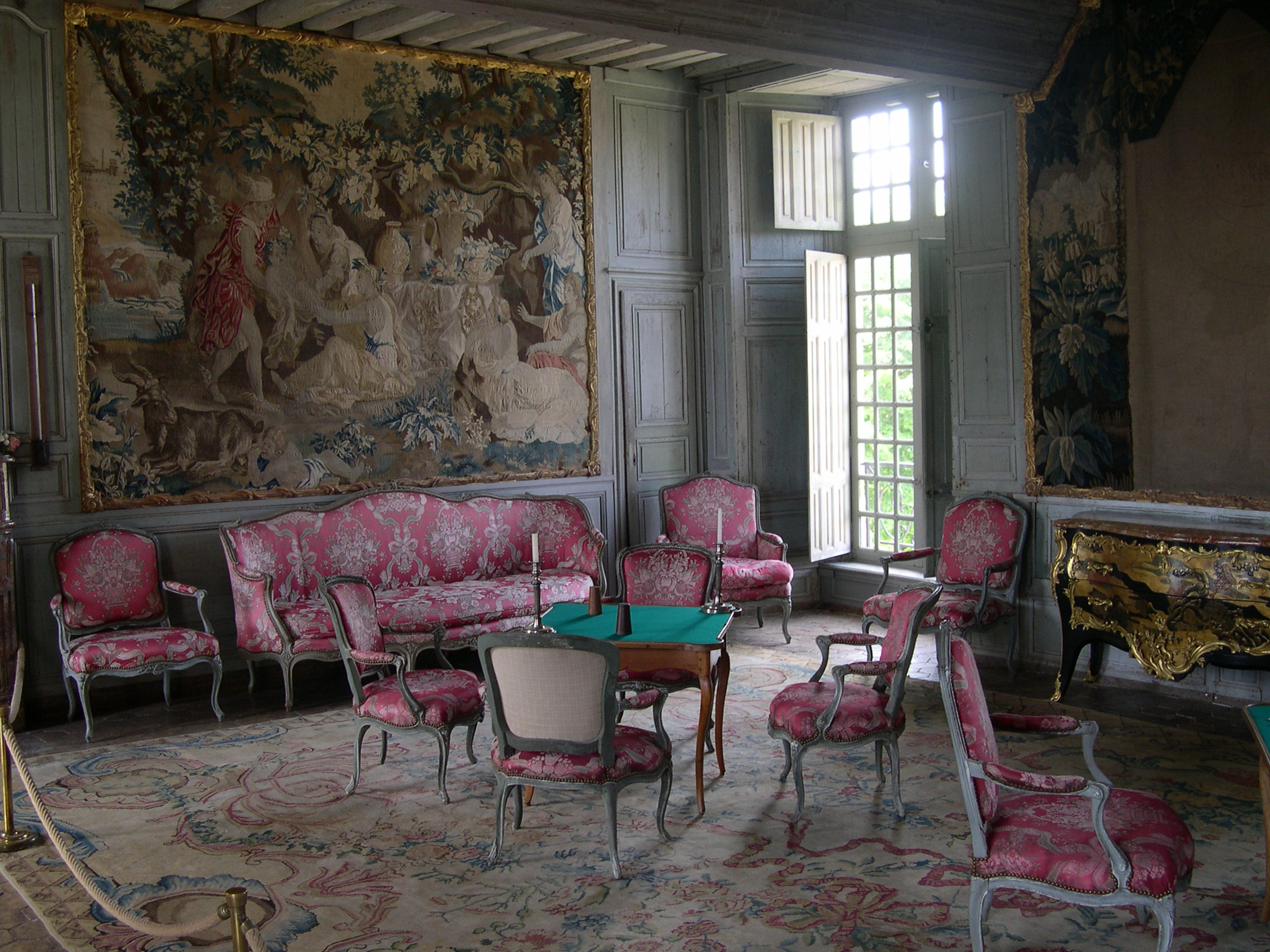
Mid-18th century "Louis XV" seat furniture, with integrated flowing lines, and a lacquer-veneered Parisian commode, mounted in gilt bronze, (Château de Talcy)

In Paris, the furniture trade was divided among craft guilds with jealous regard for infringements. Menuisiers were solely occupied with carved furnishings, which included beds and all seat furniture, as they were for the carved boiseries of the interiors they were destined to occupy. Carvers and gilders worked directly for them. Ébénistes, who drew their name from the ebony that they worked into cabinets that were carved in shallow relief and incorporated veneers of tortoiseshell and ivory, a specialty of Paris furniture in the mid-seventeenth century, retained their control over all carcase furniture that was intended to be veneered, often with elaborate marquetry. The bronze mounts that decorated these high-style case-pieces, from the 1660s to the abolition of guilds in the French Revolution, was furnished, and even carried to the ébéniste's workshop by separate guilds of foundrymen.

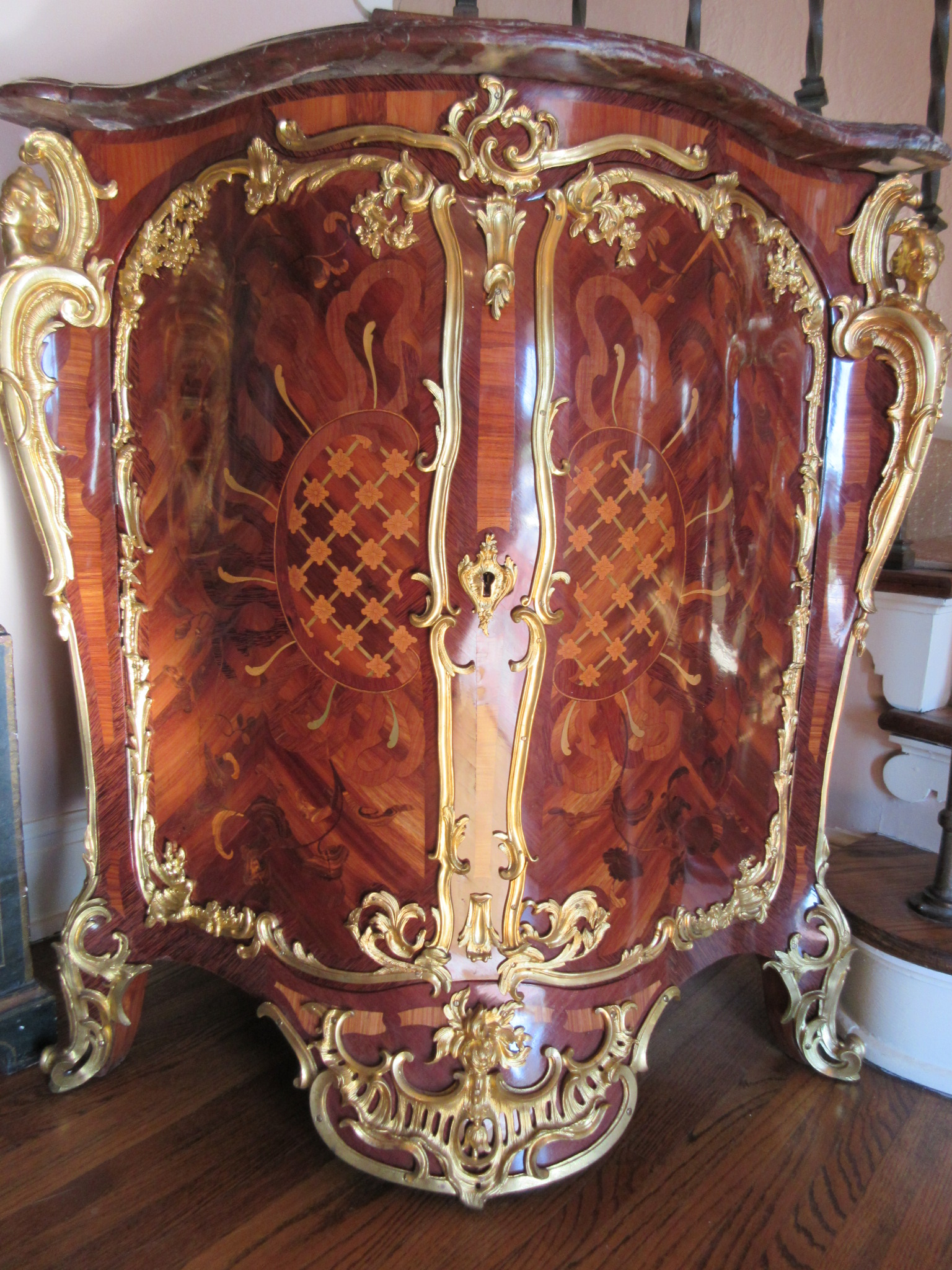
An encoignure by royal cabinetmaker Jean-Pierre Latz circa 1750 is richly ornamented with marquetry and ormolu.

French furniture of the Ancien Régime, often characterised by dealers and collectors by reign-names, as "Louis Quinze furniture", etc., can be seen as representative, even formative, manifestations of broader European styles: French Gothic furniture, of which so little has survived; French Renaissance furniture of the sixteenth century; Early Baroque furniture associated with Louis XIII, comparable to what was produced at Antwerp; sculptural and tectonic High Baroque furniture associated with Louis XIV; Rococo furniture, associated with the Régence and the reign of Louis XV; and Neoclassical furniture, associated with Louis XVI.

French furniture of the Revolution and the First French Empire is imbued with a more severe, self-consciously archaeological phase of Neoclassicism, which began to lose its grip on styles in the 1830s, with Gothic and Rococo revivals, leading to the eclecticism of the French Second Empire. Art Nouveau provided one form of reaction to the battle of the historicist styles, and Modernism marked a more rigorous break with the past. Art Deco offered a decorative version of Modernism.

Since the Second World War, the manufacture of furniture in France, devolved from the prominence of the capital itself, has been part of the increasingly international world of industrial design.

For a selection of outstanding Parisian ebénistes: see Ébéniste.

== See also ==
- Henry II style
- Louis XIV style
- Louis XIV furniture
- Louis XV furniture
- Louis XVI style
- Directoire style
- Empire style
- French Restoration style
- Louis Philippe style
- Second Empire style
- Art Nouveau
- Art Deco
- Ebeniste

== Sources ==
- Pierre Verlet
- Peter K. Thornton
- Francis J.B. Watson
- Salverte
- Nicolay
- Denise Ledoux-Lebard
- Nadine Neilson
