= Pierre Roussel =

Pierre Roussel (1723 - 7 June 1782) was a successful but somewhat pedestrian cabinetmaker (ébéniste) of Paris. He was joined in his extensive business by his two sons, Pierre-Michel (master in 1766) and Pierre le jeune (master in 1771).

Roussel's stamp, with its fleur-de-lis between the P and ROUSSEL, is often seen, but such quantities of goods made by others, both new and old, passed through the shop, and so much cabinetwork from Roussel's workshop was sold and stamped by other marchands-ébénistes, that it is not easy to recognize any consistent sequence of characteristic styles, characteristic constructions, gilt-bronze mounts unique to his shop or marquetry. Consequently Roussel is often credited with a wide-ranging stylistic approach.

The elder Roussel's father was a simple compagnon, a journeyman cabinetmaker working for a master ébéniste. Four of Roussel's brothers were menuisiers, working on carved seat furniture and room paneling. He married Marie-Antoinette Fontaine in 1743 and was received as a master cabinetmaker in the Paris guild, 21 August 1745. From modest beginnings, by the 1760s Roussel worked himself to the top of his profession: he was appointed a juré in 1762 and by 1780 and had held other offices in the Corporation des Menuisiers-Ébénistes.

Among his grand later patrons was Louis Joseph, Prince of Condé, who made considerable purchases for the Palais Bourbon and the Château de Chantilly between 1775 and 1780. At the time of his death, the inventory was compiled by a noted ébéniste, Jean-François Leleu and Jean-Baptiste Cochois. There were at least three workshops, a store-room (magasin) and a retail shop (boutique). A number of pieces were lacquered, and six lacquer panels and marquetry was mentioned, geometric, floral and landscape. There were also marble tops, and a stock of veneers.

Roussel was able to give his four daughters dowries and marry them successfully into the solid bourgeoisie. Roussel's son Pierre-Michel established himself as a furniture dealer in fashionable rue St-Honoré. Pierre II Roussel, "le jeune" inherited the family shop from his mother, who had continued to run it after her husband's death, using the same stamp, but in 1792 he closed it, to deal exclusively in exotic timbers and veneers.
