= Antoine Gaudreau =

Parisian ébéniste

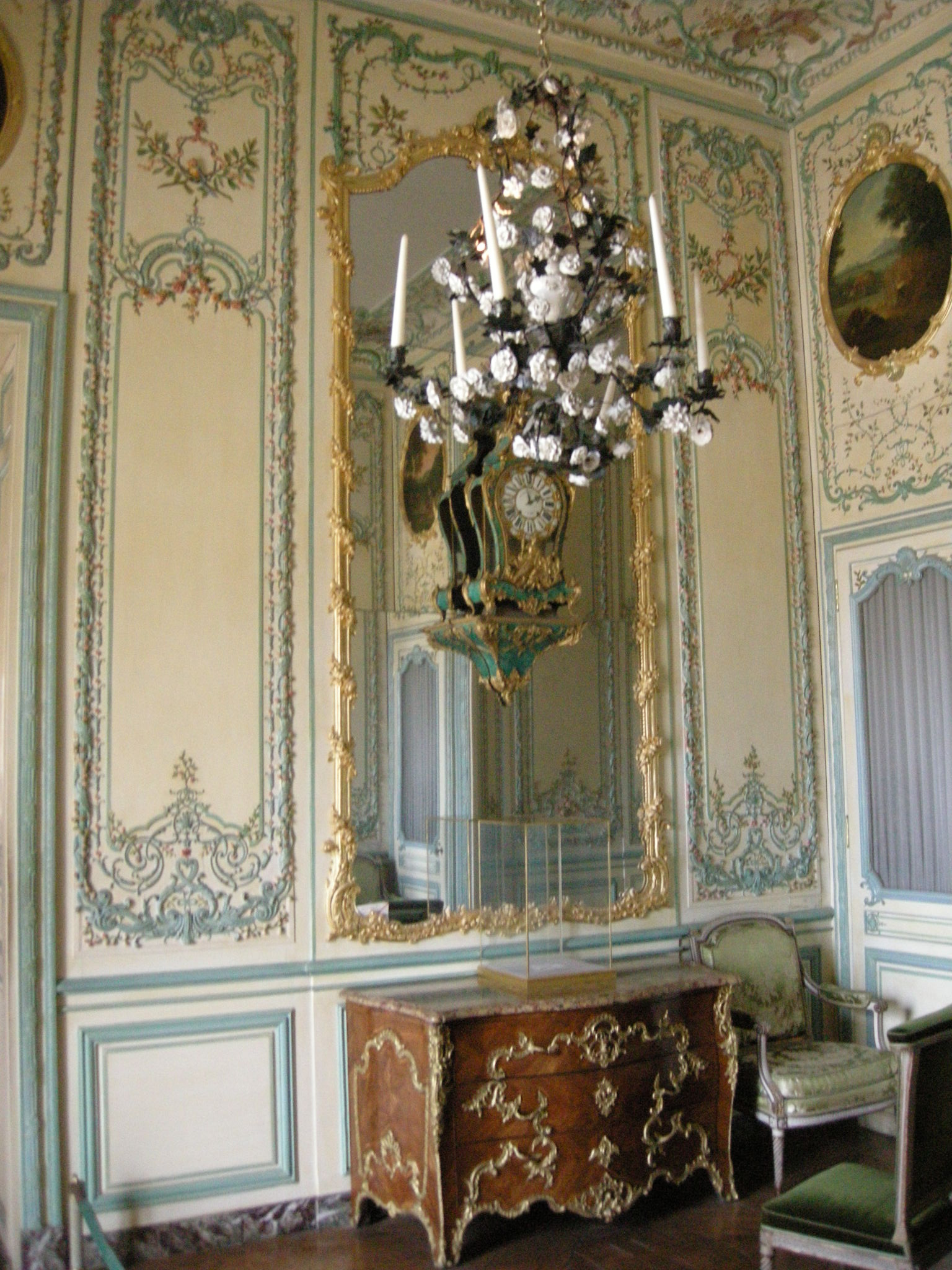
Commode (1745), delivered for Fontainebleau, now in the Cabinet Interieure de la Dauphine, Versailles

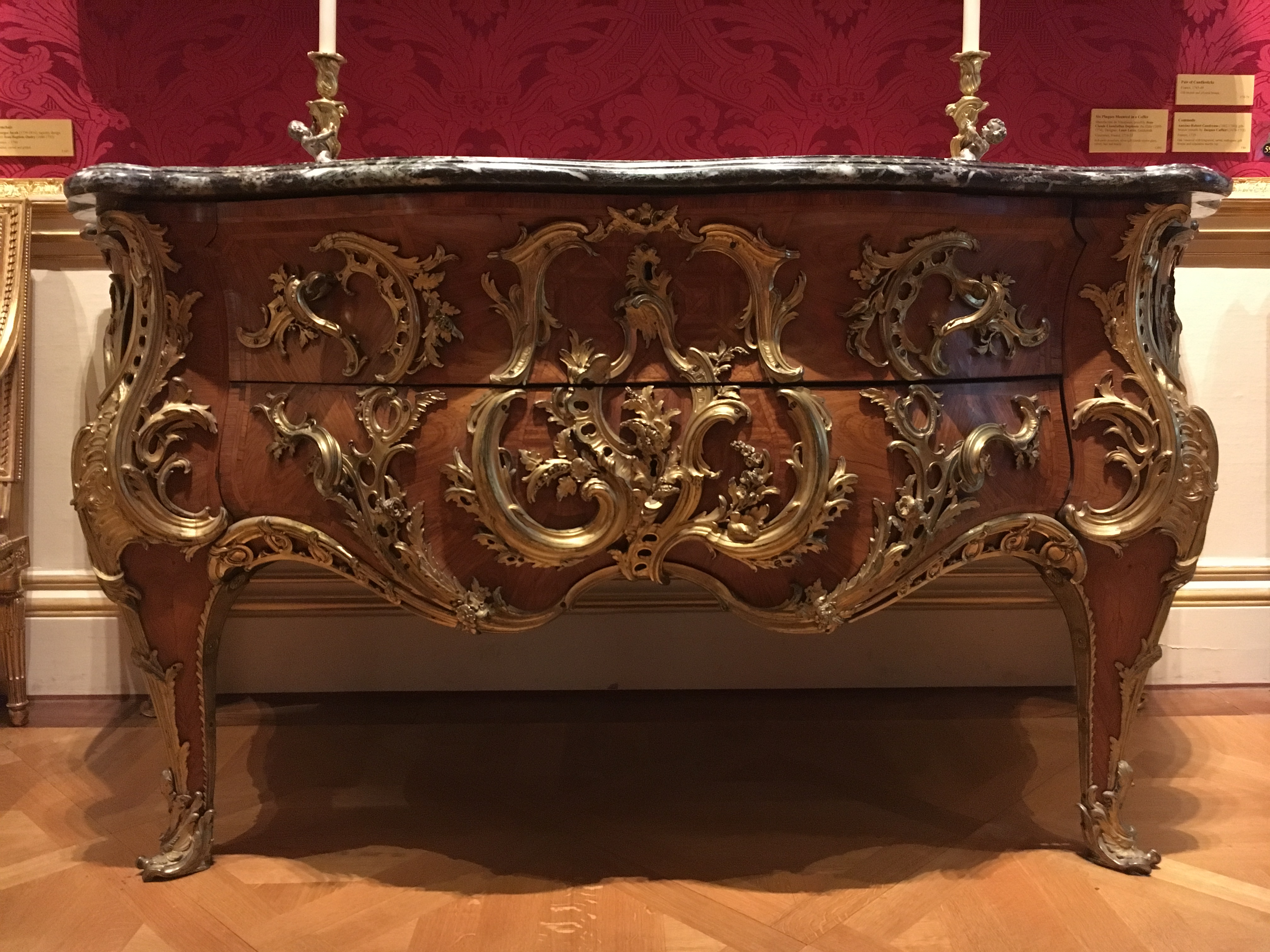
Commode (1739) for Louis XV's bedchamber at Versailles, now in the Wallace Collection

Antoine-Robert Gaudreau (c. 1680 – 6 May 1746) was a Parisian ébéniste who was appointed Ébéniste du Roi and was the principal supplier of furniture for the royal châteaux during the early years of Louis XV's reign. He is largely known through the copious documentation of the Garde-Meuble de la Couronne; he entered the service of the Garde-Meuble in 1726. However, since his career was spent before the practice of stamping Paris-made furniture began (1751), no stamped piece by Gaudreau exists and few identifications have been made, with the exception of royal pieces that were so ambitious and distinctive that they can be recognized from their meticulous inventory descriptions.

In one case, the identification of a royal commode permits the attribution to Gaudreau of several similar ones. The commode in question, formerly in the collection of Alphonse de Rothschild, was delivered by Gaudreau on 4 August 1738 intended for the King's bedroom at Château La Muette. The gilt-bronze mounts, by which André Bouthemy attributed the commode to Charles Cressent, who may have been responsible for modelling them. Several commodes following this model exist, including one in the Jones Collection at the Victoria and Albert Museum, London. One of the group bears on its gilt-bronze mounts the crowned C tax stamp that was used in 1745-49, suggesting that the model remained current for several years.

The first French reference to a table servante, a dumb waiter or tiered serving table with recesses for cooling wine for suppers free of protocol and servants, occurs in a bill of Gaudreau in 1735, of furniture delivered to Versailles.

His premises were in rue Princesse, apart from the cabinet-making neighborhoods of Paris. He was elected syndic of the cabinet-makers' guild, the Corporation des Menuisiers-Ébénistes in 1744.

He was succeeded in his workshop, for a brief time, by his son François-Antoine Gaudreau (died 1751), also Ébéniste du Roi.

His most famous pieces are:

- The commode veneered with kingwood and satiné that he delivered for the King's Bedchamber at Versailles in 1739. It has gilt-bronze mounts by Jacques Caffieri, stamped FAIT PAR CAFFIERI. The commode is now in the Wallace Collection, London (Cat.no. F86).
- The commode-médaillier, a medal cabinet in the form of a commode, delivered in 1739 for the king's use in Louis XV's Cabinet à Pans at Versailles. In this commission Gaudreau followed a design provided by the Slodtz brothers. It is in the Cabinet des Médailles at the Bibliothèque Nationale.
- The low cupboard-bookcase delivered in 1744 for the king's Cabinet d'Angle at Versailles.
- The commode à la Régence (illustrated above), delivered for the Dauphine's apartment at the Château de Fontainebleau in 1745. It is now at Versailles.
- A bureau plat now in the Archives Nationales. (Verlet 1945).
