= Jacques-Philippe Carel =

French cabinet-maker

Jacques-Philippe Carel (fl. 1723–1760) was a Parisian cabinet-maker (ébéniste), who was admitted to the cabinetmakers' guild in 1723 and specialized in rococo case pieces of high quality veneered in end-grain (bois de bout) floral marquetry.

Two almost identical commodes made c. 1755 at the Frick Collection, New York, are part of an unusually large group of commodes of almost identical shape, variously veneered but bearing the same mounts, apparently commissioned from numerous cabinetmakers by a single marchand-mercier, who originated the design and retained a monopoly of the mounts.
