= Henry Dasson =

Nineteenth century Parisian furniture maker

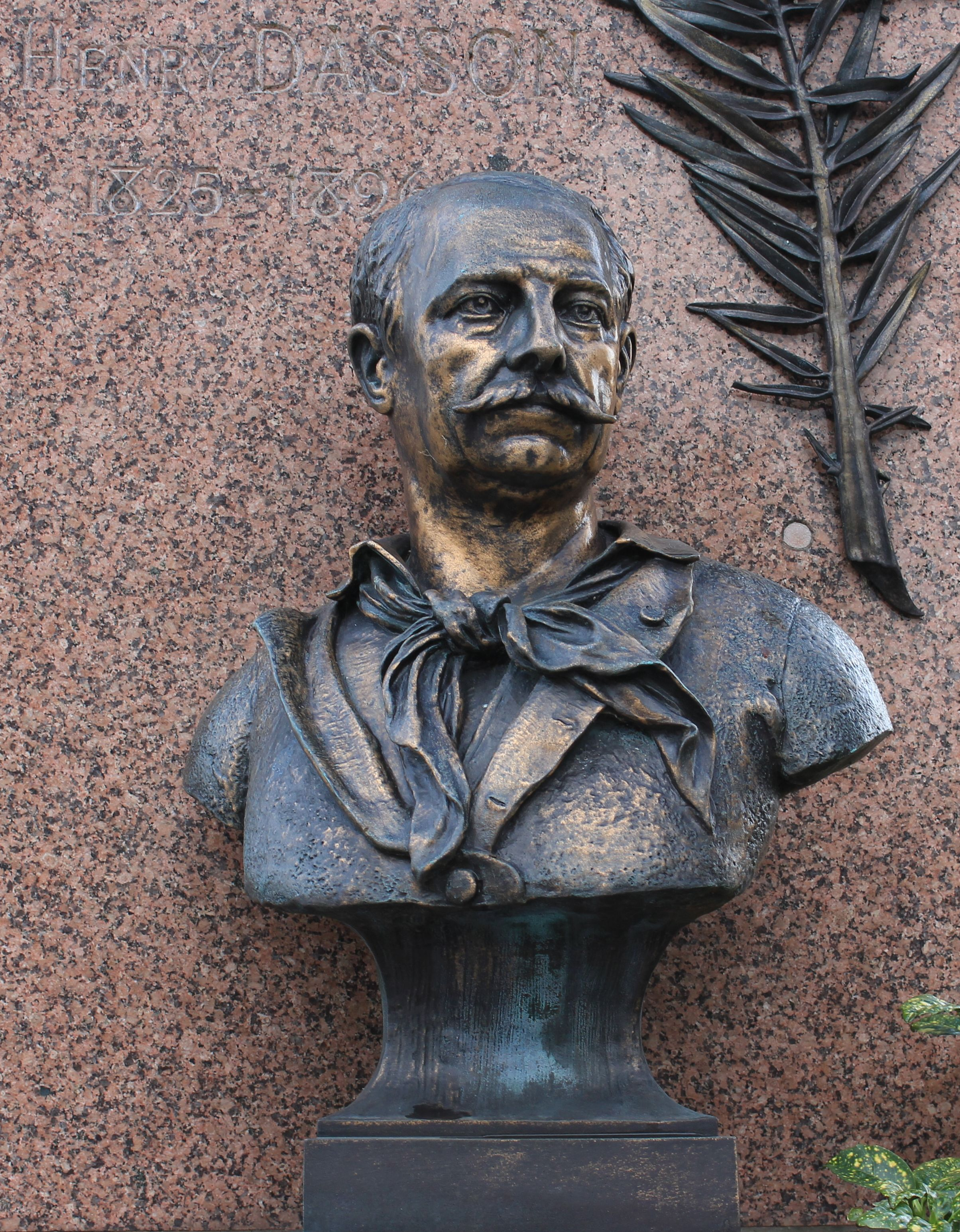
- Bust of Henry Dasson at the cemetery of Père-Lachaise
- Born: c. 1825
- Died: 1896 (aged 70–71)
- Occupation: Ébéniste (cabinetmaker)

Henry Dasson (c. 1825–1896) was a nineteenth century Parisian maker of gilt-bronze mounted furniture. Unlike other cabinetmakers of the time Dasson began his career as a bronze sculptor, and consequently one characteristic of his work is the quality of his bronze and more precisely of the chiselling.

His Paris workshop was situated at 106 rue Vieille-du-Temple, where he specialised in the production of Louis XIV, XV and XVI style furniture using the finest gilt-bronze mounts.

In 1871, he purchased the flourishing business and remaining stock of Charles-Guillaume Winckelsen, known for the high quality of his furniture. It has been suggested that Dasson inherited the craft of ciseleur from Winckelsen.

At the 1878 and 1889 Paris Expositions Universelles Dasson exhibited a number of pieces in the Louis XV and XVI styles, as well as pieces of his own modified eighteenth-century design. The exhibits in 1878 included a table entirely in gilt-bronze, purchased by Lord Dudley. His copy of the celebrated Bureau du Roi sold at the same exhibition to Lady Ashburton.

Dasson ceased production in 1894, and at this time held a sale of his models, listed in 'Catalogues of drawings for art bronzes, style furniture and important decoration with rights of reproduction by Henry Dasson et Cie, manufacturer of art bronzes and cabinetmaker as a result of cessation of production..' The records from this sale show that Paul Sormani, as well as Joseph Emmanuel Zweiner, Maison Millet and Beurdeley acquired certain drawings and models by Dasson.

== Bibliography ==
- Mestdagh, Camille; Lécoules, Pierre (2010). L'Ameublement d'art français: 1850–1900. Editions de l'Amateur.
- Ledoux-Lebard, Denise (1984). Les Ebenistes du XIXeme siècle. pp. 146–151.
- Meyer, Jonathan (2006). Great Exhibitions—London, New York, Paris, Philadelphia, 1851–1900. Woodbridge: Antique Collectors' Club. p. 269, pls. H7, H8, H10: p. 270, pl, H12.
