= Mathäus Funk =

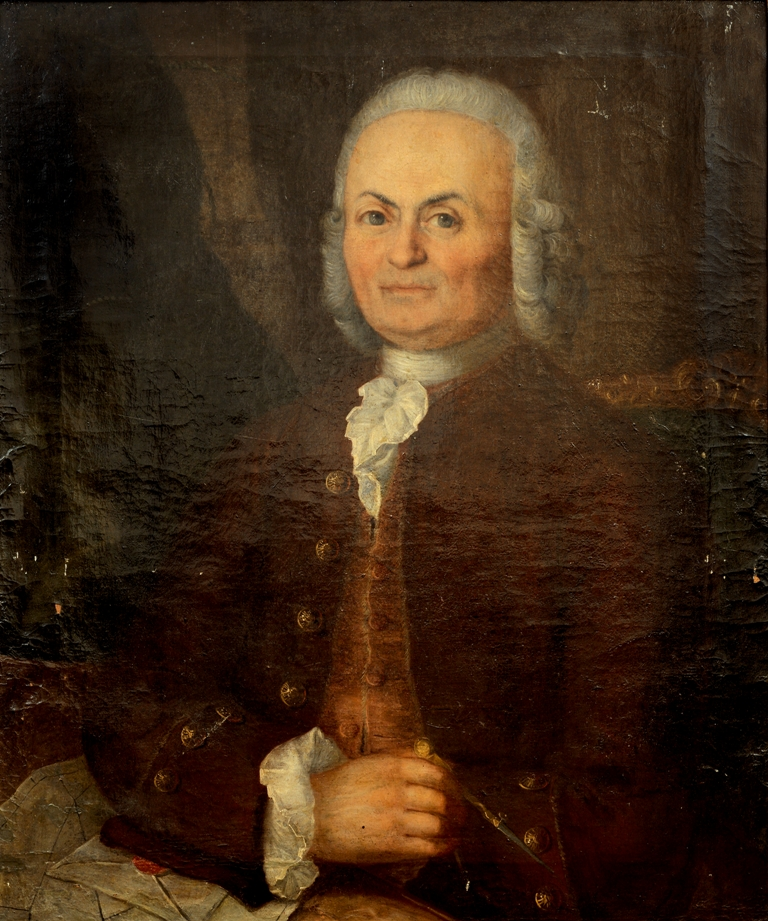
- Funk portrayed by John Webber, c. 1770
- Born: Mathäus Funk; 18 April 1697; Murten, Old Swiss Confederacy (now Switzerland)
- Died: 24 September 1783 (aged 86); Bern, Old Swiss Confederacy
- Occupation(s): Cabinet maker, ebonist
- Era: Baroque
- Spouse: Maria Magdalena Wäber (m. 1725)
- Children: 1
- Relatives: John Webber (nephew-in-law)

Mathäus Funk also spelled Matthäus Funk (German pronunciation: [mataːʊs funk]; 18 April 1697 - 24 September 1783) was a Swiss ebonist and cabinet maker who was primarily active in Bern, Switzerland. Many of his furniture pieces were featured in notable auctions like Lempertz or Sotheby's.

== Life ==
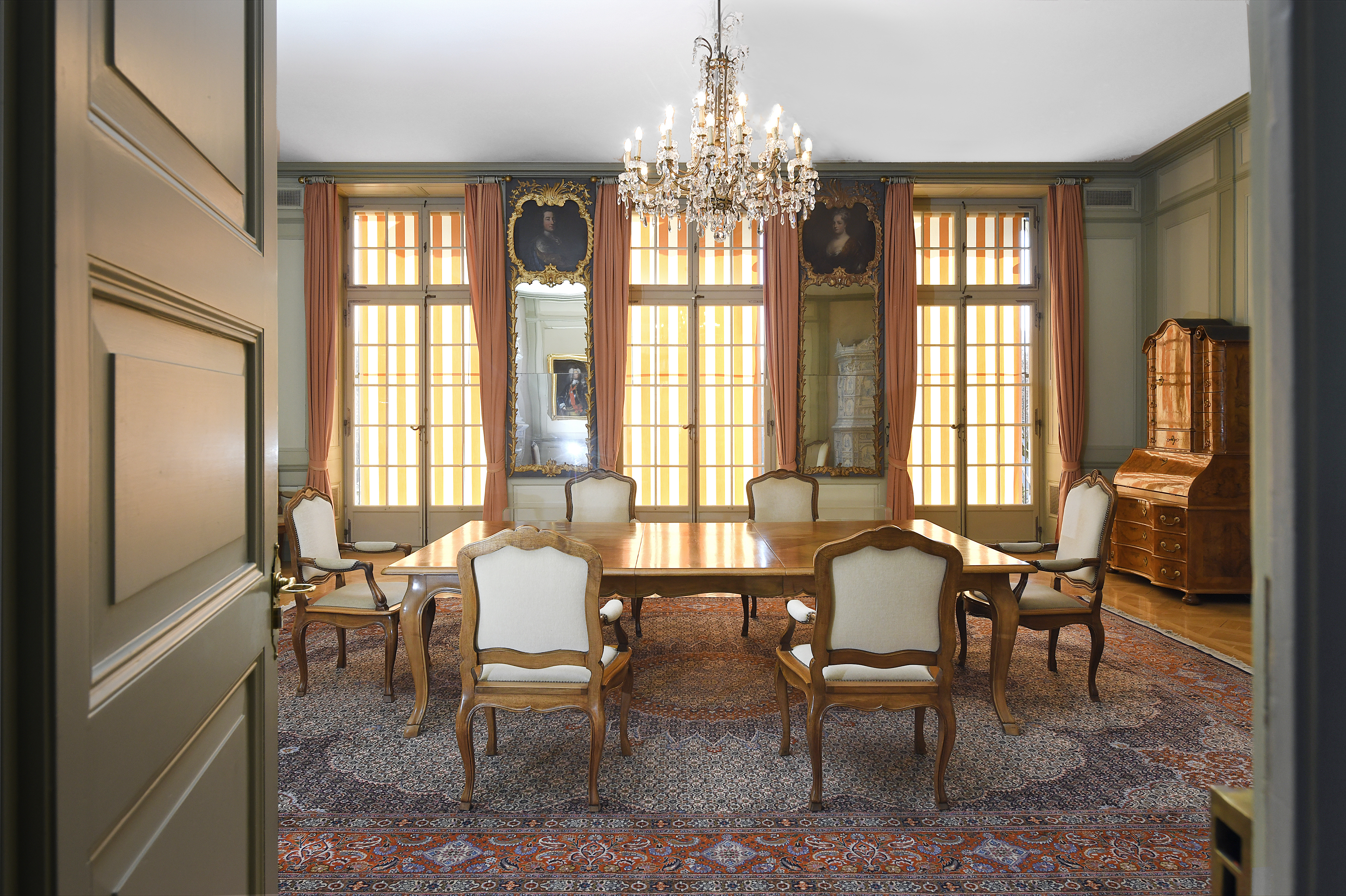
Erlacherhof with furniture by M. Funk (Bern, Switzerland)

Funk was born 18 April 1697 in Murten, Old Swiss Confederacy, to German-born Johann Lorenz Funk, a postal carrier, and Anna Margarita Funk (née Sergant). He completed an apprenticeship as cabinetmaker and then worked as a wandering journeyman.

He took-up residency in Bern on 23 November 1724. In 1725 he married Maria Magdalena Wäber, who hailed from an old, well-established Bernese family. They had one son, Daniel Funk, who became a watchmaker. After his wife's death, his sister-in-law, Rosina Wäber, managed the household. A brother of his wife, Abraham Wäber, emigrated to England. His nephew-in-law, John Webber, became the expedition painter of James Cook.
