= Thomas Elfe =

English interior designer and cabinetmaker

- Born: 1719; London, England
- Died: November 18, 1775; Charleston, South Carolina
- Occupation: Artisan
- Spouse(s): Mary Hancock (1748); Rachel Prideau (1755–1775)

Thomas Elfe (1719 – 28 November 1775) was an English interior designer and ébéniste (cabinetmaker).

Born and trained in London, he immigrated to America in the 1740s, settling permanently in Charleston, South Carolina. The socio-economic context of the region enabled him to prosper. He invented, designed and marketed quality furniture appreciated by wealthy families. An entrepreneur with innovative methods, he became the most famous furniture craftsman in colonial America in the 18th century. Examples of his work are now on display in many American monuments and museums.

== Biography ==
=== Career path ===
Of Scottish origin, Thomas Elfe was born in London, England, in 1719. Trained as a cabinetmaker by his uncle, he emigrated from England in the 1740s to Virginia and, around 1746, settled in Charleston (Province of South Carolina).

By the middle of the 18th century, "Charles Town" was booming economically. Middle-class citizens were becoming wealthier than in New York City or Philadelphia. Their furniture purchases were a lucrative business for local craftsmen and cabinetmakers. The people of Charleston saw themselves as English citizens, living in the province of South Carolina. They emulated London society by seeking, for example, to own quality furniture. Charleston's wealthy appreciated the London style and rejected the work of local carpenters.

Thomas Elfe sought to make his qualities known. In October 1747, for example, he advertised in the South Carolina Gazette for a pair of large carved and gilded wall sconces, valued at £150. (Note: According to author Samuel A. Humphrey, this would represent several thousand American dollars in the 20th century. Humphrey (1995), p. 1)

Recognized as a "master" of the craft, he took on one or two apprentices and entrusted them with carpentry and furniture repair and construction tasks. As an established furniture maker, the business flourished in this booming economy, and led to the success and profitability of Thomas Elfe's carpentry workshop.

During this period of colonial America, he was considered Charleston's finest furniture craftsman of the 18th century. The company's account book is preserved by the Charleston Library Society. Covering several accounting years, it shows that, between 1768 and 1775, Thomas Elfe, accompanied by several employees, produced over one thousand five hundred pieces of furniture, including finely detailed cabinets. These documents also show that he sold an average of around seventeen pieces of furniture per month.

His professional career lasted almost thirty years, from 1746 to approximately 1775. At one point, his fortune exceeded £6,200. Local Charleston historian and former director of the Charleston Museum, E. Milby Burton (1889–1977), attributed to Thomas Elfe the creation of some of the finest furniture of national renown ever produced. E. Milby Burton described him as the most successful furniture craftsman of the eighteenth century.

=== Personal life and relationships ===
In June 1748, Thomas Elfe married Marie Hancock, a widow who died a few months later. He did not remarry until late 1755, when he married Rachel Prideau. They had six children: William, Elizabeth, Hannah, George, Thomas and Benjamin.

homas Elfe's work influenced Thomas Chippendale (1718–1779). Their lives shared many similarities. Both were born in England at the same time, and both spent their childhoods in London. They were apprenticed in the capital in the 1730s; Thomas Elfe was his uncle's apprentice, while Thomas Chippendale was his father's apprentice. They each married in 1748, then became widowers and remarried. Each had a son named Thomas, who later took over his father's furniture business. They lived through the dark days of the American Revolution unaffected. They both had large furniture stores with many employees, and died within four years of each other.

Thomas Elfe was also a close friend of Charleston carpenter and sculptor Thomas Watson. He learned much from his skills. When Thomas Watson died in 1747, he chose Elfe as heir to his business and personal effects.

=== Death and will ===
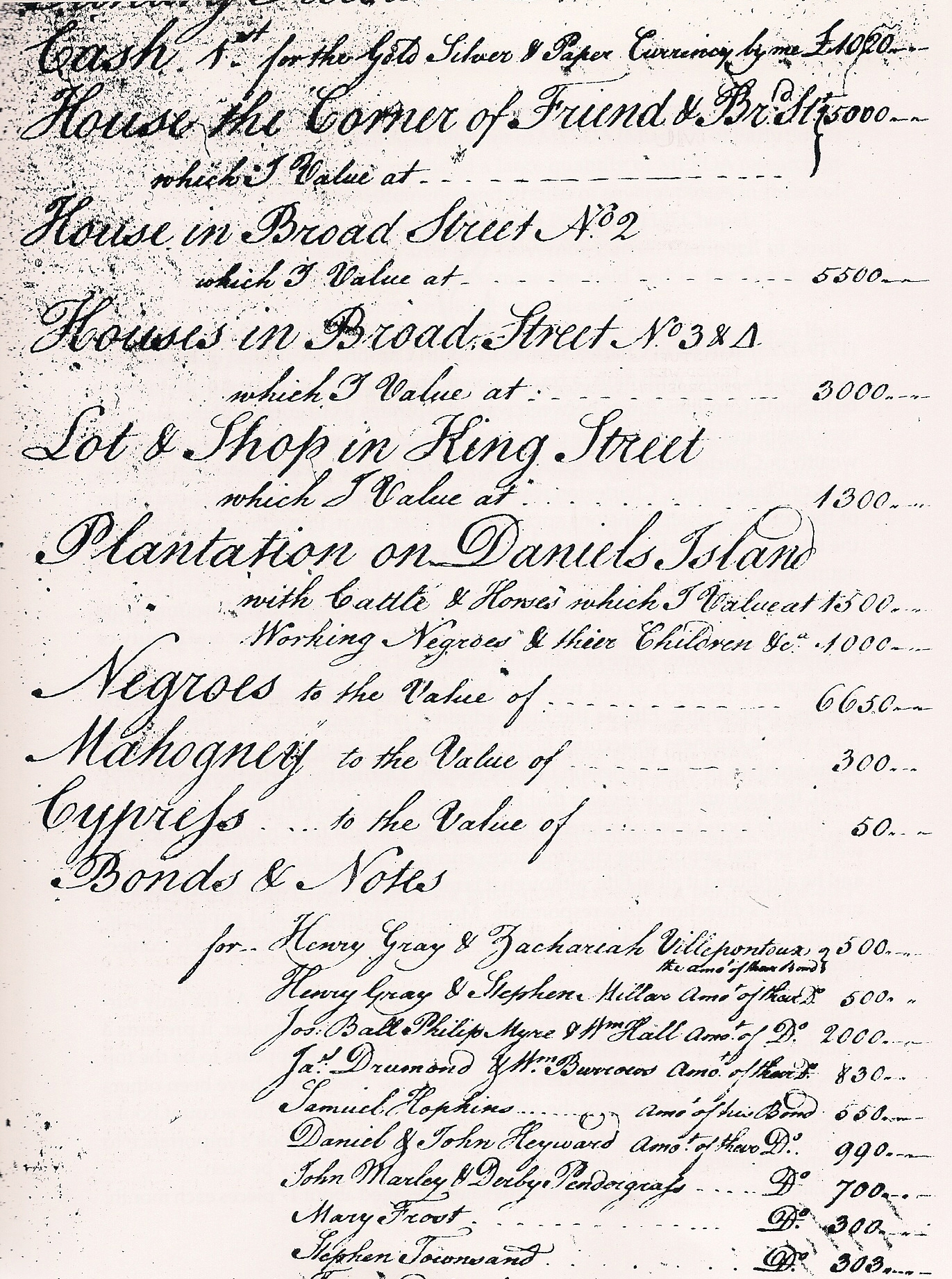
Thomas Elfe's will dated 7 July 1775.

Thomas Elfe died on 28 November 1775, in Charleston, at the age of 56. His burial place is unknown. Each of his children received a townhouse and £1,000. William also inherited the Amelia Township plantation and its eight negroes. Thomas, his only cabinetmaker son, received the company's equipment, the associated property and three black cabinetmakers, named Joe, Jack and Paul. Thomas Elfe, who owned them as slaves, employed them in various tasks, including cleaning and minor furniture repairs. Rachel, his wife, and friends Thomas Hutchinson and Benjamin Baker are the executors of his will.

== Works ==
Innovative furniture designer Thomas Elfe produced tea tables and trays, coffeepot handles, bookcases and lounge chairs, as well as stackable chests, double chests of drawers and built-in wardrobes. He focused on the London style, but his work could also be Georgian, Rococo, Gothic, Chinese or French.

To optimize his creations, Thomas Elfe, together with his partner Thomas Hutchinson, twenty-three white and around eight black craftsmen, set up a well-organized production chain divided into five parts. The chain started with Jeremiah Sharp sawing the mahogany, while a second group of carpenters, including Thomas Ralph, prepared the cypress used for the furniture's structure. The bulk of the process then moved to the store itself, where the smallest items were designed. Sculptors then decorated them. The final stage in the production chain involved all the finishing touches, which were always carried out outside the store. By using this method of subcontracting, Thomas Elfe reorganized the manufacturing system in the workshops, while other famous cabinetmakers in London were also trying to do the same at this time.

Works by Thomas Elfe are on display at the South Carolina Governor's Mansion in Columbia, the Charleston Museum, the DeWitt Wallace Decorative Arts Museum in Virginia, the Museum of Early Southern Decorative Arts in North Carolina, and the Winterthur Museum, Garden and Library in Delaware. In 1758, he made chairs and tables for the Council Chamber for £728. Two years later, he rebuilt the framework of St. Michael's Episcopal Church. Around 1763, the churchwardens asked him to design the altar. Thomas Elfe closed the store at an unknown date.

To date, no piece of furniture has been found bearing the customary label in Thomas Elfe's name. If he so identified them, however, it is unlikely that they would have withstood Charleston's humid summers and the insects that feed on the glue. To identify a piece of furniture made by Thomas Elfe, researchers are therefore relying on other leads, notably the fact that he produced huge quantities of furniture, which increases the chances of finding authentic pieces.

Some exceptional features common to several pieces of furniture recently found in Charleston clearly indicate that they were made by the same cabinetmaker. For example, the frette – an ornament formed by half-timbers drawing broken lines on a flat surface that intersect – is repeated on many of these pieces. Although it is impossible to attribute this technique – which was common in his day – to him, its constant use on the furniture found in Charleston suggests that these pieces are the work of Thomas Elfe, to the exclusion of almost all other craftsmen.

== Property assets ==
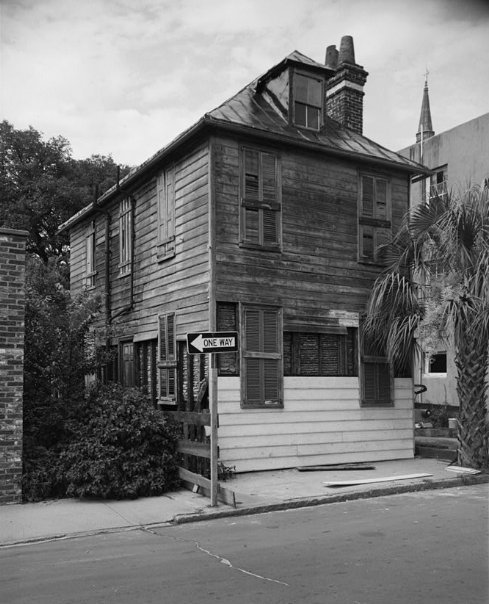
Thomas Elfe's house in 1963, before its restoration.

Thomas Elfe was also a real estate investor. He made his money buying, selling and renting properties in the Charleston area. He owned a number of properties that served, from time to time, as his principal residence, a haven of peace or a furniture store, but the addresses of which are uncertain. A description of his furniture store in the South Carolina Gazette of 28 September 1747, placed his main workshop "near Doct. Martin", a location that is no longer known. In 1748, his store is said to be "on the corner opposite Mr. Eycott", also an unknown location.

He owned a building in Broad and Friend, now Legare. In 1766, it was advertised for rent in the South Carolina Gazette. The ad stated that the main house was three stories high, with three bedrooms on each floor. A separate house on the property served as his store.

Thomas Elfe's house at 54 Queen Street, which he designed and built in 1760, still stands in Charleston.

== Bibliography ==
- Burton, E. Milby (1997). Charleston Furniture, 1700-1825. University of South Carolina Press. ISBN 978-1-57003-147-2.
- Foster, Mary Preston (2005). Charleston: A Historic Walking Tour. Arcadia Publishing. ISBN 978-0-7385-1779-7.
- Humphrey, Samuel A. (1995). Thomas Elfe, Cabinetmaker. Wyrick. ISBN 978-0-941711-15-9.
- Perry, Lee Davis (2007). Insiders' Guide to Charleston: Including Mt. Pleasant, Summerville, Kiawah, and Other Islands. Globe Pequot Press. ISBN 978-0-7627-4403-9.
- Hart, Emma (2009). Building Charleston: Town and Society in the Eighteenth-Century British Atlantic World. University of Virginia Press. ISBN 978-0-8139-2869-2.
- Taunton Press (1995). Fine Woodworking, numéros 113 à 116. Taunton Press.
- Charleston Museum (1933). Fine Woodworking, numéros 2 à 27. Charleston Museum.
