= Encoignure =

Furniture in room corner

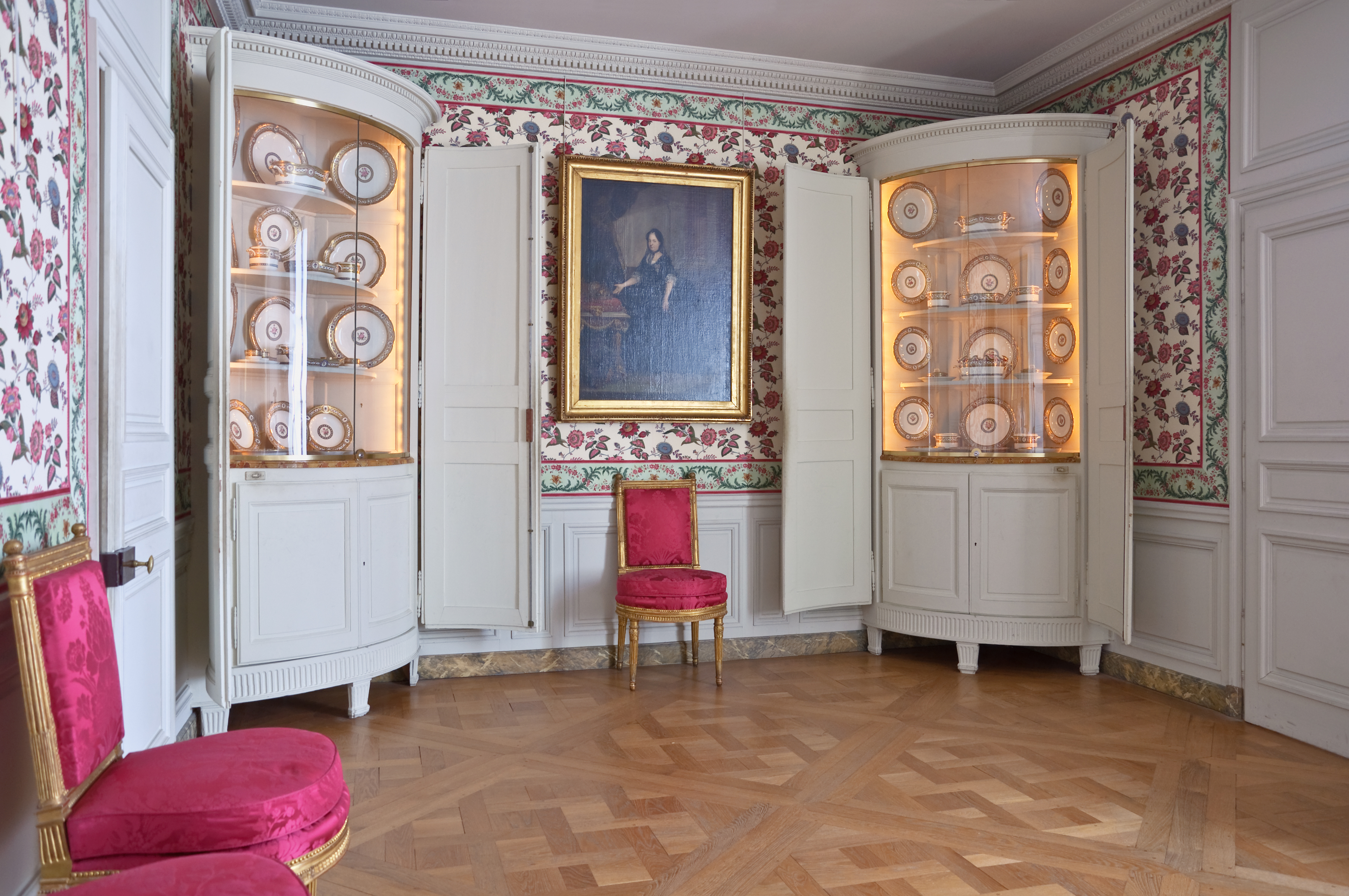
Encoignure vaisseliers in the petit appartement de la reine at the Palace of Versailles

Encoignure is a type of furniture located in a corner of a room. In French, it literally means the angle, or return, formed by the junction of two walls. Since the 20th century, the word has been chiefly used to designate a small armoire, oakley, commode, cabinet, or cupboard made to fit a corner. A chair placed in a corner is referred to as a chaise encoignure.

Originally the design came from France, hence the name: pieces in the Louis Quinze or Louis Seize style in lacquer or in mahogany, elaborately mounted in gilded bronze, are among the more alluring pieces from the period of grand French furniture. They were made in a vast variety of forms so far as the front was concerned; but are otherwise strictly limited by their destination. As a rule these delicate and dainty pieces were in pairs and placed in opposite angles; frequently the tops were finished in expensive colored marble.

== See also ==
- What-not
