= Petit appartement de la reine =

Rooms in the Palace of Versailles, France

Coordinates: 48°48′16″N 2°7′14″E

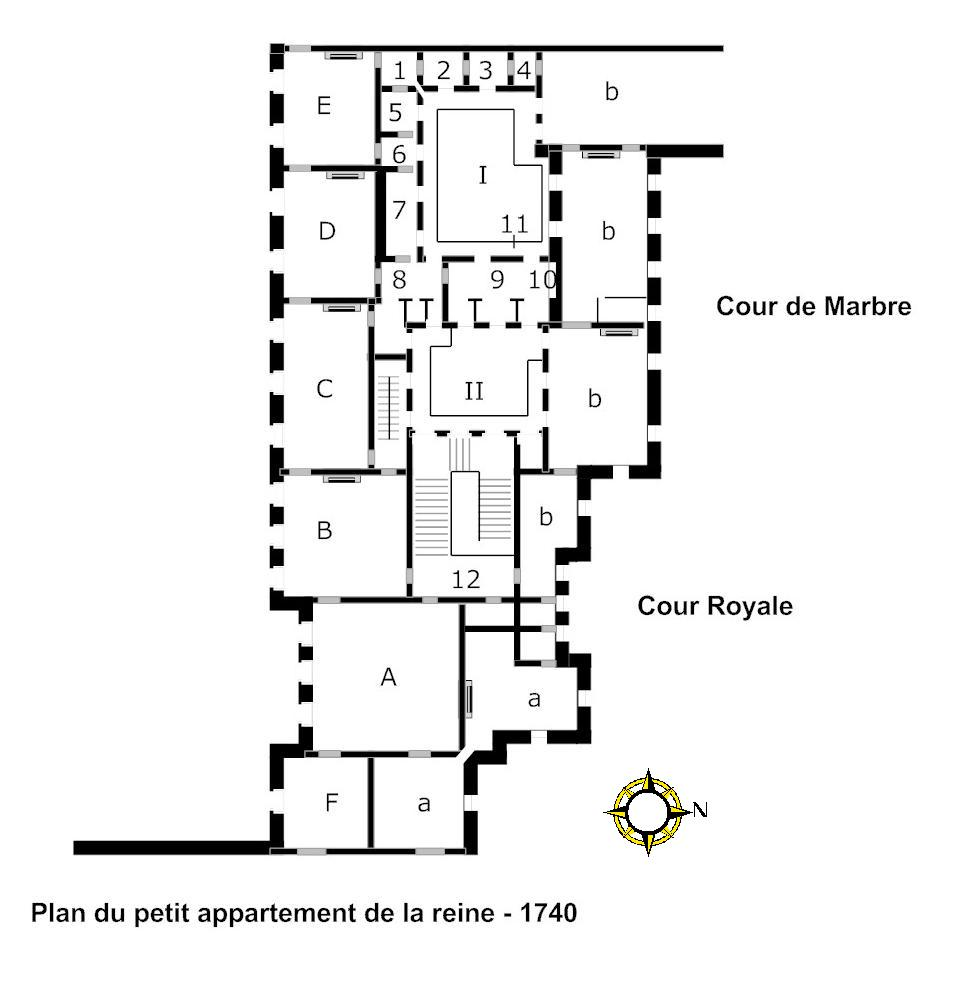
- Plan of the petit appartement de la reine ca. 1740

Key to the plan of the petit appartement de la reine
- 1: escalier (staircase)
- 2: service de la reine
- 3: valet du roi
- 4: passage (aisle)
- 5: cabinet de la chaise (toilet room)
- 6: oratoire (chapel)
- 7: petite galerie (cabinet des chinois; laboratoire)
- 8: pièce des bains (bathrooms)
- 9: grand cabinet intérieur
- 10: arrière cabinet
- 11: terrasse
- 12: escalier de la reine (Queen's Staircase)
- A-F: grand appartement de la reine (Queen's State Apartment)
- a: ancien appartement de la marquise de Maintenon (Mme de Maintenon's previous rooms)
- b: appartement du roi (King's Apartment)
- I: cour de Monseigneur
- II: cour de Monsieur

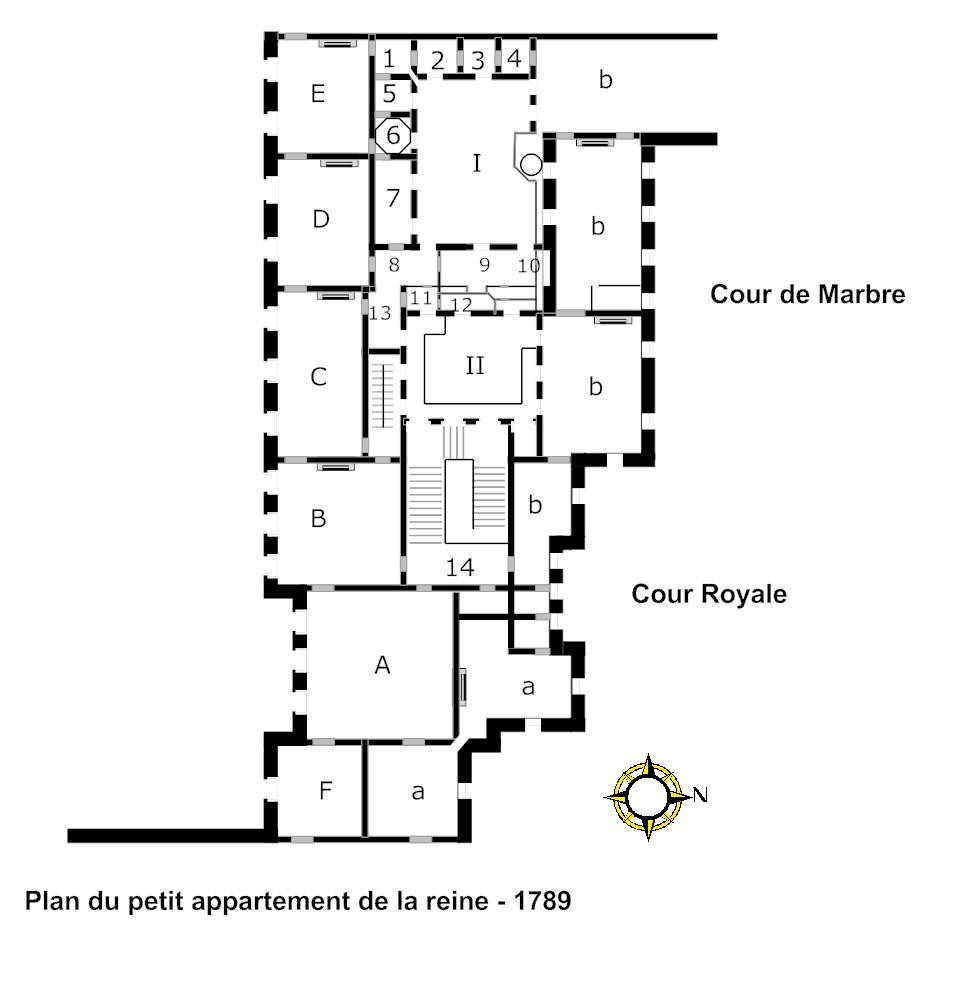
- Plan of the petit appartement de la reine ca. 1789

Key to the plan of the petit appartement de la reine
- 1: escalier (staircase)
- 2: service de la reine (Queen's Service)
- 3: escalier à l’appartement de la reine au rez-de-chaussée (staircase to Queen's Apartments on the ground floor)
- 4: passage (aisle)
- 5: cabinet de la chaise (toilet room)
- 6: cabinet de la Méridienne
- 7: bibliothèque (library)
- 8: supplément de la bibliothèque (annex to library)
- 9: grand cabinet intérieur
- 10: arrière cabinet
- 11: pièce des bains (bathrooms)
- 12: chambre des bains (bathroom)
- 13: antichambres (anterooms)
- 14: escalier de la reine (Queen's Staircase)
- A-F: grand appartement de la reine (Queen's State Apartment)
- a: appartement du duc de Duras
- b: appartement du roi (King's Apartment)
- I: cour de Monseigneur
- II: cour de Monsieur

The petit appartement de la reine (French: [pɛˈtit‿apaʁtəˈmɑ̃dəlaʁɛn], Queen's Small/Private Aparment) is a suite of rooms in the Palace of Versailles. These rooms, situated behind the grand appartement de la reine, and which now open onto two interior courtyards, were the private domain of the queens of France, Maria Theresa of Spain, Marie Leszczyńska, and Marie Antoinette, as well as of Princess Marie-Adélaïde of Savoy as dauphine.

The rooms in the petit appartement de la reine have been restored to the condition in which they were left when Marie Antoinette left Versailles on 6 October 1789, and while the rooms are mostly Louis XVI style, some parts are Louis XV style, or Rococo, like the fireplace mantel found in the supplément de la bibliothèque (annex to library), or the centre table in the cabinet de la Méridienne, as well as the mantel clock in the billiard room.

== Marie-Thérèse ==
At the completion of architect Louis Le Vau's enveloppe, Maria Theresa of Spain's private area consisted of suite of five rooms that opened on the southern side of the cour de marbre (Marble Courtyard) and onto a small interior courtyard – at the time called the cour de la reine (Queen's Courtyard). In these rooms, Maria-Theresa led her private and family life. Very little information survived about the décor or the arrangement of these rooms, owing largely to her early death in 1683 (Verlet 1985, p. 253).

The most significant modifications to the petit appartement de la reine were made after the marriage of Louis XIV's grandson, Louis, Duke of Burgundy, with Princess Marie-Adélaïde of Savoy in 1697. Shortly after the marriage, in 1699, a suite of three rooms was constructed – known as the appartement de nuit du duc de Bourgogne (Night Apartments of Duke of Burgundy) (Verlet 1985, p. 210). These rooms were created for the conjugal visits of the young duc with his wife. Consisting of a bedroom, cabinet, and garde-robe, this part of the petit appartement de la reine when constructed in 1699 divided the cour de la reine into the cour de Monseigneur to the west and the cour de Monsieur to the east (Verlet 1985, p. 256). These rooms also communicated with the appartement du roi and formed part of petit appartement de la reine and were used by the princess until her death in 1712.

== Maria Leszczyńska ==
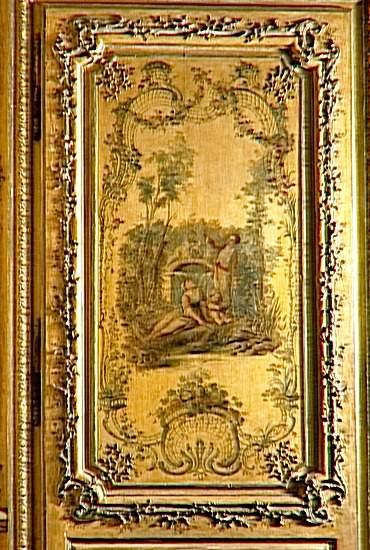
Arrière cabinet detail of vernis Martin woodwork, 1750s, coming from a back chamber of the apartment of Maria Josepha of Saxony, by carpenter Guillaume and Etienne-Simon Martin

Under Queen Marie Leszczyńska, the petit appartement de la reine underwent three distinct phases of modification: 1728-1731; 1737–1739; and, 1746-1748.

The 1728-1731 phase resulted in the construction of a chambre des bains (1740 plan #8); the petite galerie (1740 plan #7); and an oratory (1740 plan #6) (Verlet 1985, p. 401).

The 1737-1739 phase saw significant redecoration in the petite galerie (Small gallery) with a décor of paneling in green and gold vernis Martin. At this time, the appartement de nuit du duc de Bourgogne (Night Apartments of Duke of Burgundy) was remodeled for use by the queen with the construction of the grand cabinet intérieur (1740 plan #9) and the arrière cabinet (1740 plan #10), both of which were decorated with intricately carved and painted paneling. At this time, a number of paintings, most notably by artists François Boucher and Charles-Antoine Coypel, were displayed in the petit appartement de la reine (Verlet 1985, p. 402)

The 1746-1748 phase saw a redecoration of the petite galerie. During this time it was called alternately cabinet des chinois – owing to the number of chinoiserie designs by the queen, which she had framed and hung in this room – or laboratoire – a laboratory where she pursued her hobbies. At this time, the oratoire (chapel) was converted in the cabinet de la Méridienne with new paneling by carpenter Jacques Verberckt. The pièce des bains was redecorated with paneling by the Rousseau brothers and paintings by artist Charles-Joseph Natoire. The grand cabinet d’intérieur received new paneling by Verberckt (Jallut, 1969; Pons, 1992; Verlet 1985, p. 402-403).

With the death of Queen Marie Leszczyńska in 1768, the petit appartement de la reine remained vacant until the arrival of the new dauphine, Marie Antoinette, in 1770.

== Marie-Antoinette ==
The fame of the petit appartement de la reine rests squarely in the hands of the last queen of France during the Ancien Régime. The restored state of the rooms seen today at Versailles closely replicate the petit appartement de la reine as it appeared during Marie Antoinette's day (Verlet, 1937). Modifications of the petit appartement de la reine for Marie-Antoinette began in 1779 (Verlet 1985, p. 585).

Marie Antoinette ordered her favorite architect, Richard Mique to cover the walls of the petit appartement de la reine with white satin embroidered with floral arabesques, to give a decorative cohesion to the rooms. The cost of the fabric was 100,000 livres; the hangings were entirely replaced with wood paneling in 1783 (Verlet 1985, p. 586).

In 1781, to commemorate the birth of the first dauphin, Louis XVI commissioned architect Richard Mique to redecorate the cabinet de la Méridienne (1789 plan #6) (Verlet 1985, p. 586). It was in this room that Marie Antoinette would choose the clothing she would wear that day.

In this same year, the bibliothèque – occupying the site of the petite galerie of Marie Leszczyńska – (1789 plan #7) and the supplément de la bibliothèque – occupying the pièce des bains of Maria Leszczyńska – (1789 plan #8), and, additionally, a room for the toilette à l’anglaise a pièce des bains and a salle des bains were arranged, opening on the cour de Monsieur (Verlet 1985, p. 403).

The last major modification to the petit appartement de la reine occurred in 1783, when Marie Antoinette ordered a complete redecoration of the grand cabinet intérieur. The costly embroidered hangings were replaced with carved gilt paneling designed by Richard Mique. The new décor caused the room to be renamed the cabinet doré (Verlet 1985, p. 586).

Of all the features of the petit appartement de la reine, the so-called secret passage that links the grand appartement de la reine with the appartement du roi is one that has become a legend in the history of Palace of Versailles. The passage actually dates from the time of Queen Maria-Theresa, and had always been a suite of service rooms that also served as a private means by which the king and queen could communicate with each other (1740 plan #1-4; 1789 plan #1-4). It is true, however, that Marie Antoinette, who was sleeping in the chambre de la reine in the grand appartement de la reine, escaped from the Paris mob on the night of 5/6 October 1789 by using this route. The entrance to the so-called secret passage is through a door located on the west side of the north wall of the chambre de la reine.

== Gallery of Images ==
Views of the petit appartement de la reine
Bibliothèque - library

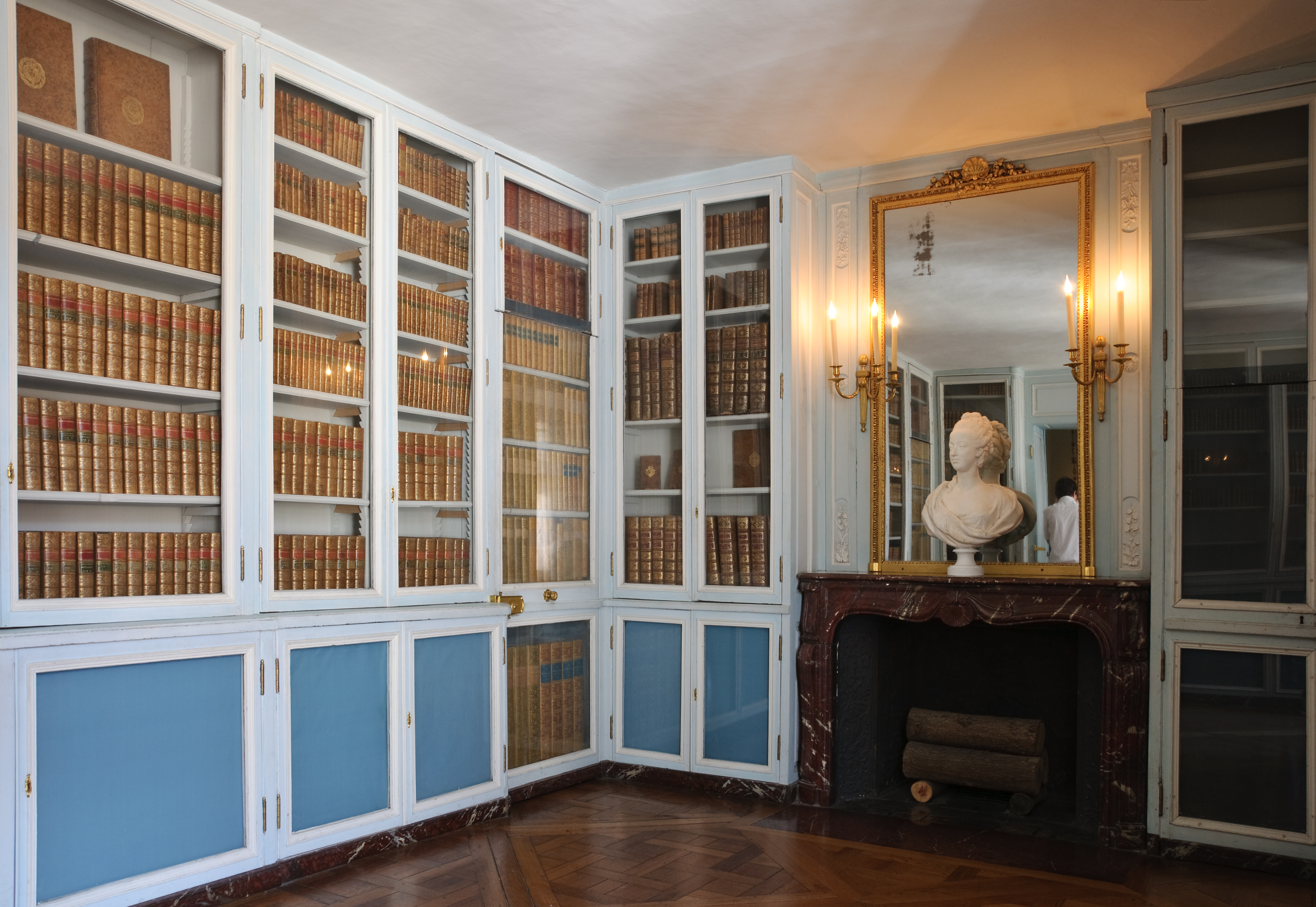
Supplement de la bibliothèque – annex to the queen's library

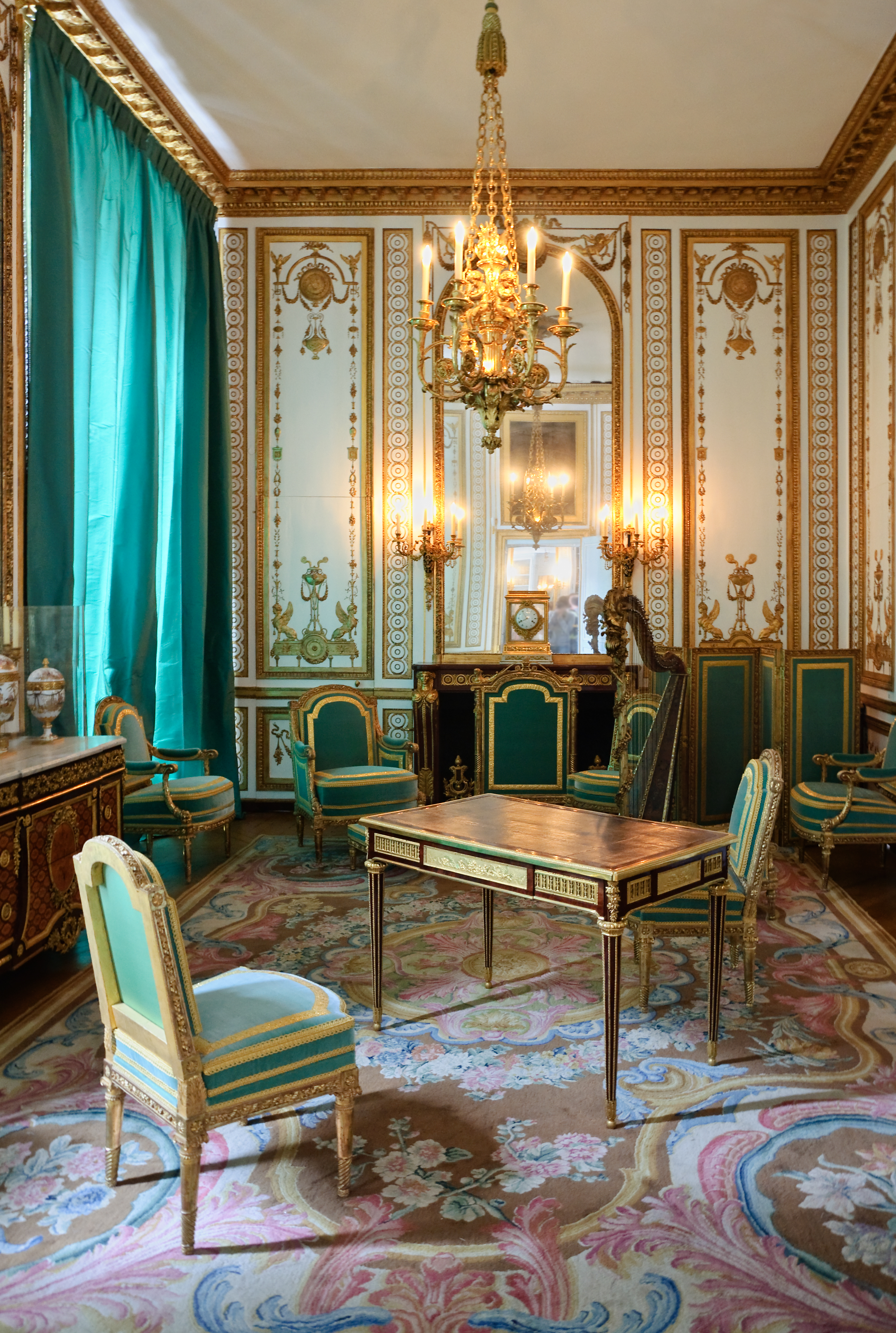
Grand cabinet intérieur – le cabinet doré

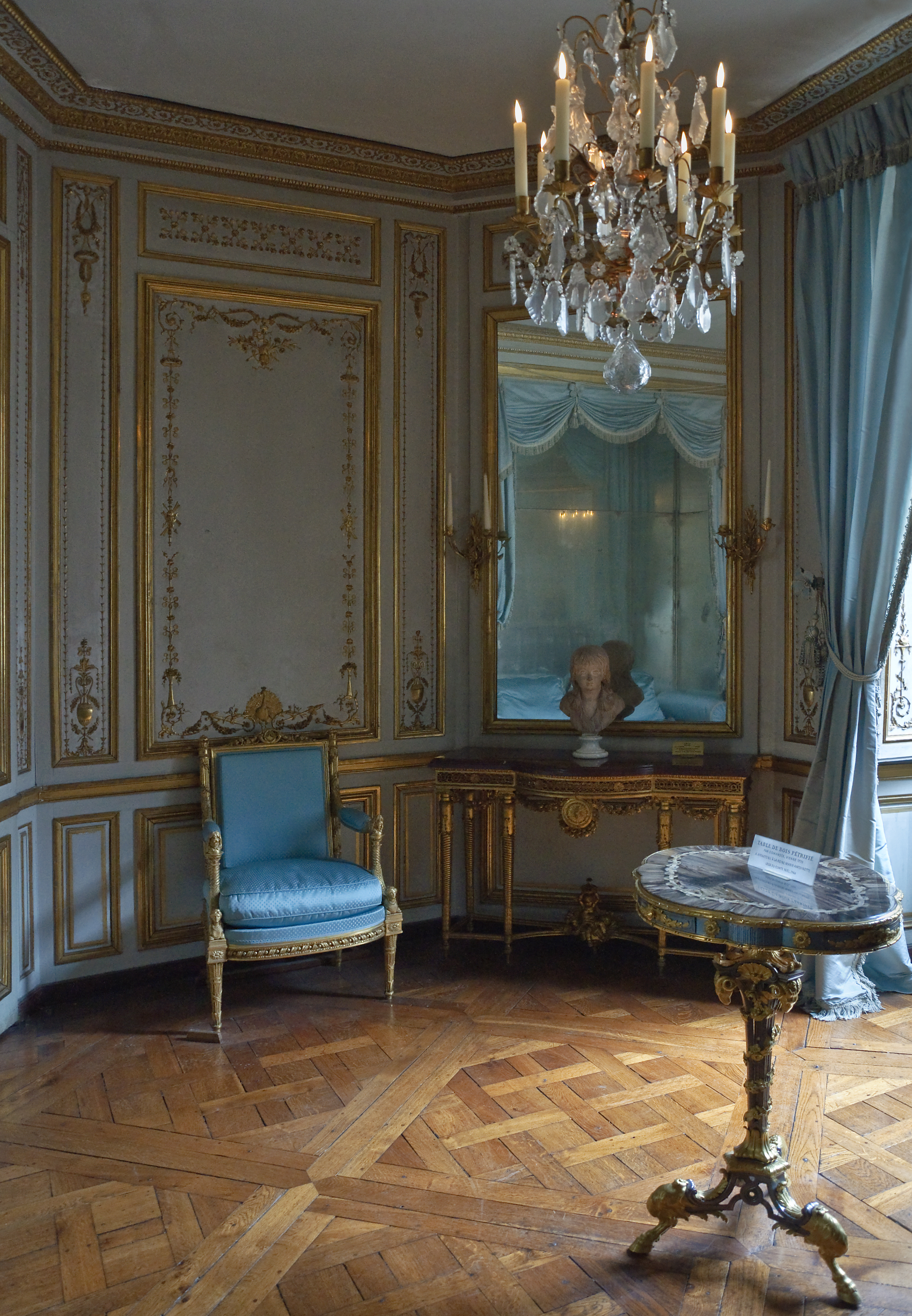
Cabinet de la Méridienne

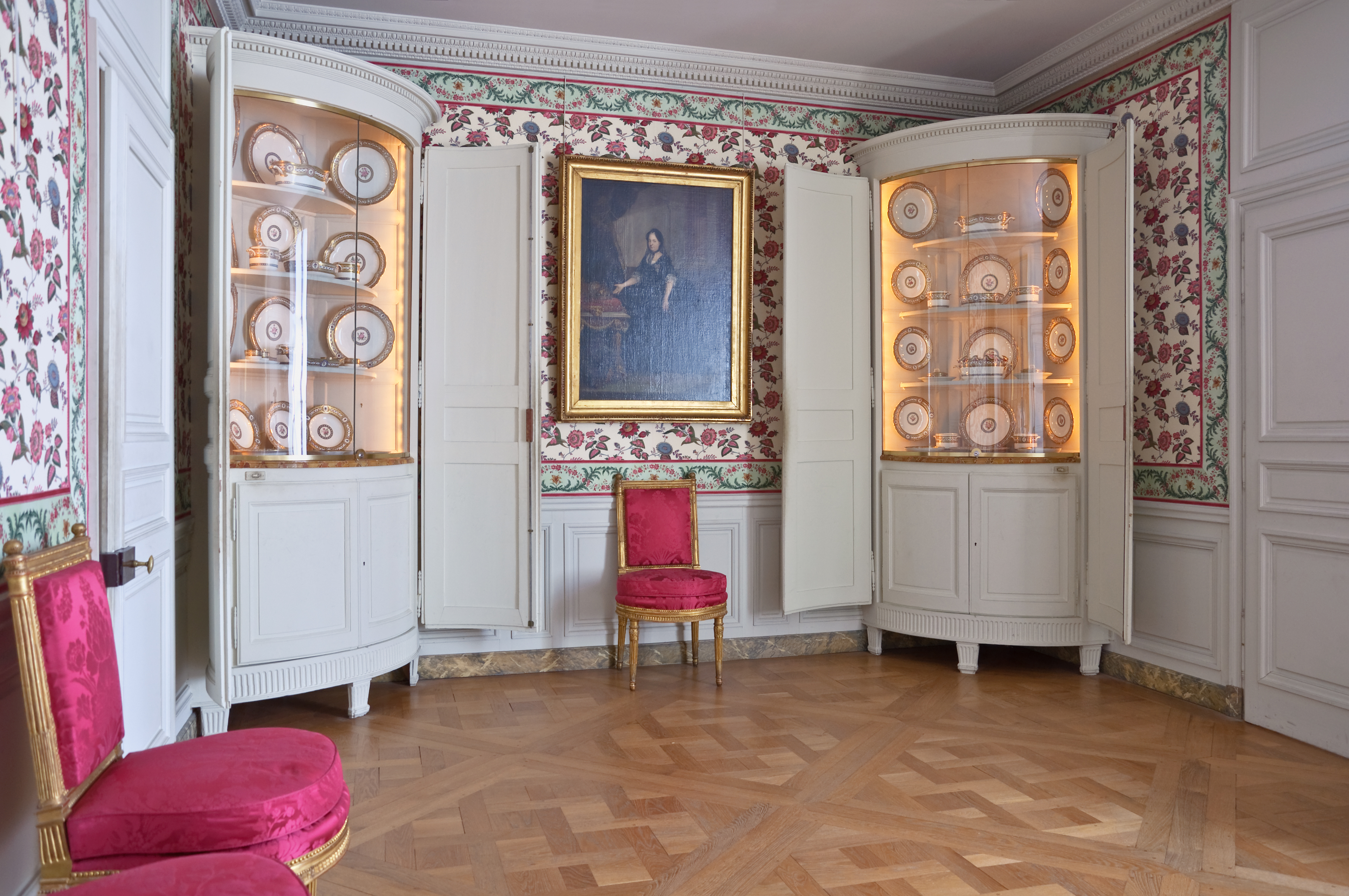
The dining room on the second floor. Tableware from the Sèvres service ordered for Marie Antoinette in 1784 displayed in the corner cabinets

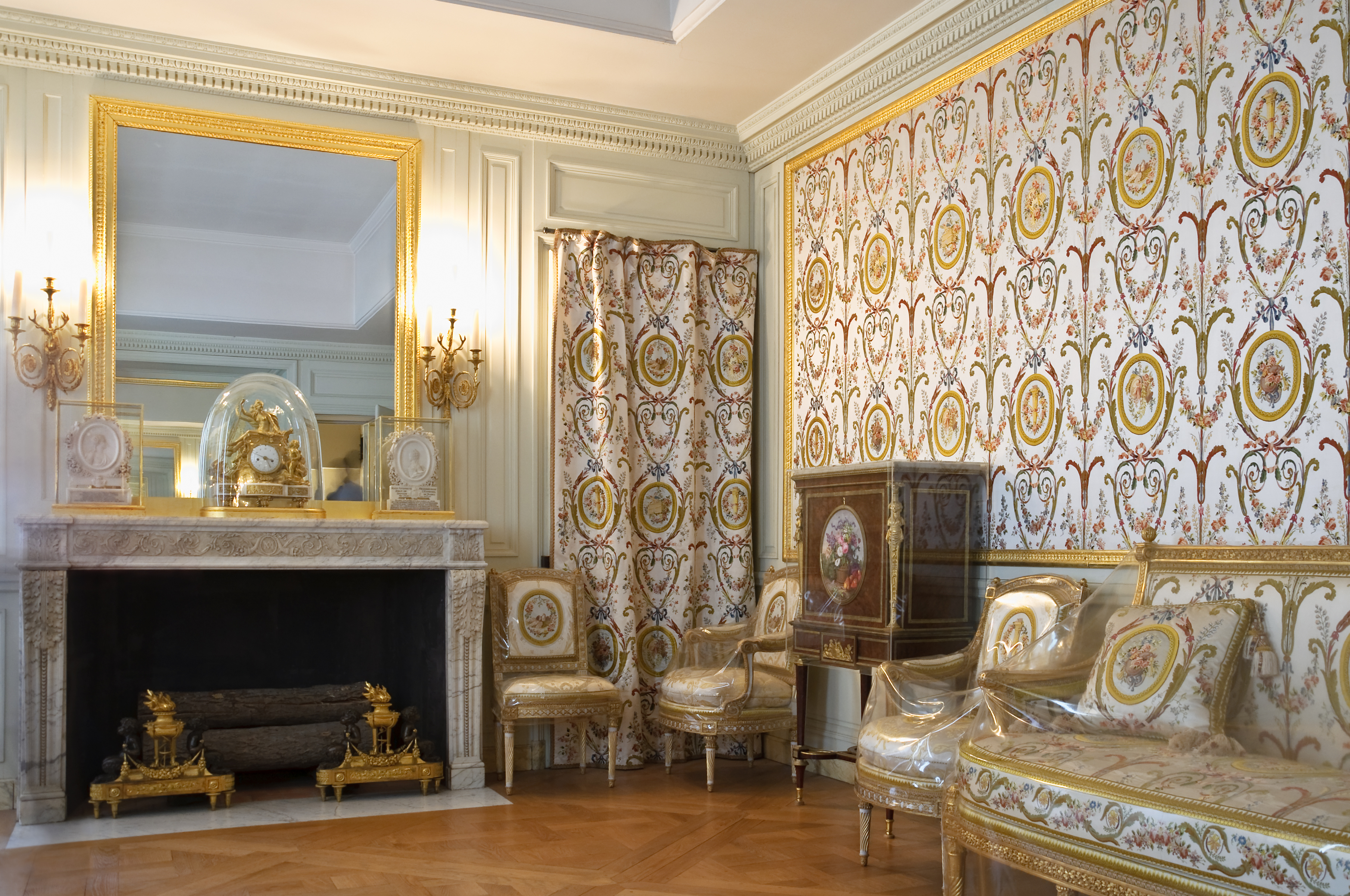
Billiard room of Marie Antoinette, on the 2nd floor

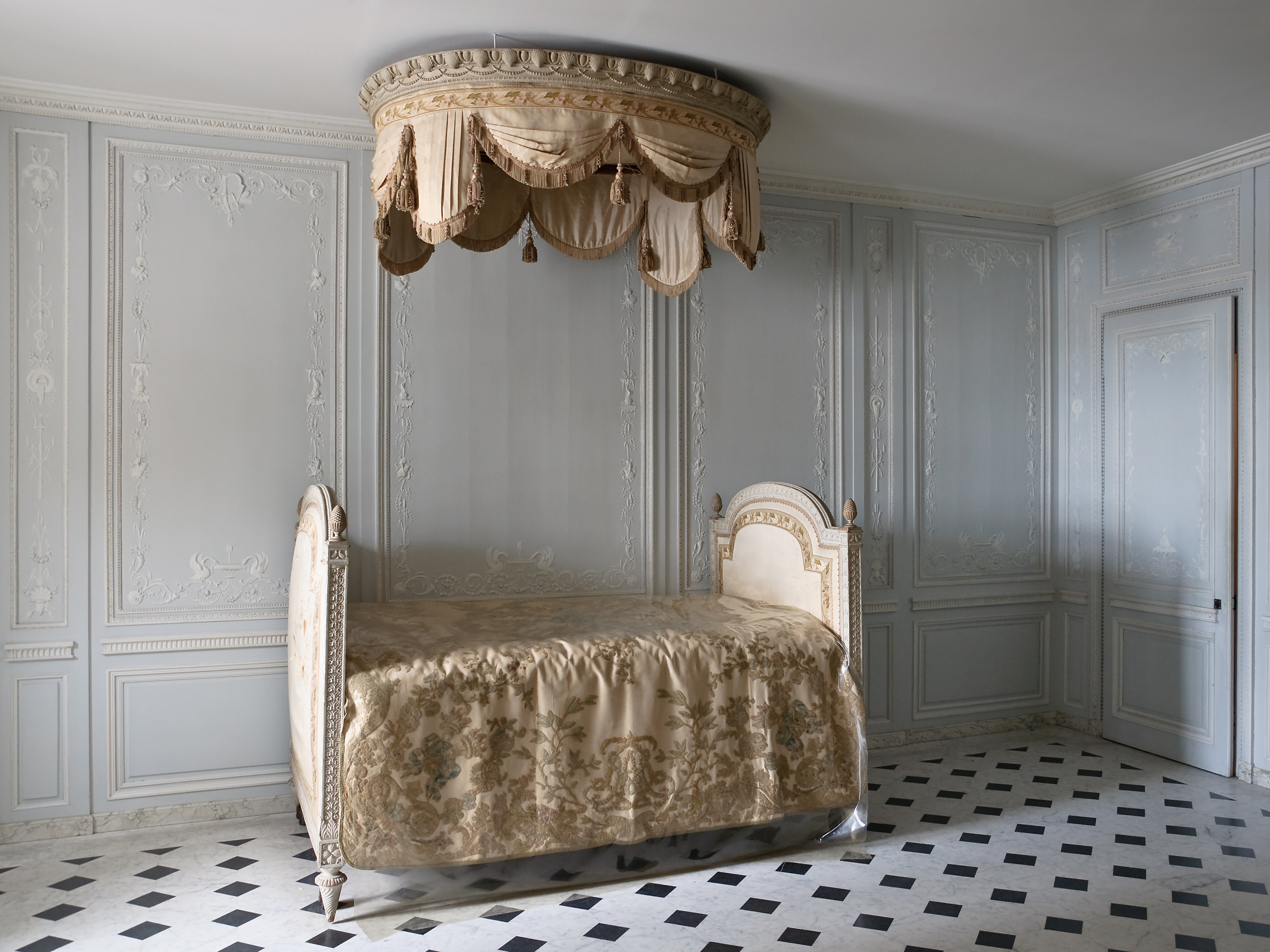
Bathroom on the ground floor

== Sources ==
Books

- Blondel, Jacque-François (1752–1756). Architecture françoise, ou Recueil des plans, élévations, coupes et profils des églises, maisons royales, palais, hôtels & édifices les plus considérables de Paris (4 volumes). Paris: Charles-Antoine Jombert.
- Bluche, François (1991). Dictionnaire du Grand Siècle. Paris: Arthème Fayard.
- Bluche, François (2000). Louis XV. Paris: Perrin.
- Campan, Madame (1823). Mémoires sur la vie privée de Marie-Antoinette (3 vols). Paris: Baudouin frères.
- Cronin, Vincent (1975). Louis and Antoinette. New York: William Morrow and Company, Inc. ISBN 9780688003319.
- Croÿ-Solre, Emmanuel de (1906–1921). Grouchy, Emmanuel-Henri de; Cottin, Paul (eds.). Journal inédit du duc de Croÿ (4 volumes). Paris : E. Flammarion.
- France d'Hézecques, Félix comte de (1873). Souvenirs d'un page de la cour de Louis XVI. Paris: Didier.
- Kimball, Fiske (1943). The Creation of the Rococo. Philadelphia: Philadelphia Museum of Art.
- La Rochefoucauld, Gabriel de (1943). Marie Leczinska femme de Louis XV. Paris: Éditions de France.
- Lever, Évelyne (1991). Marie-Antoinette. Paris: Fayard.
- Lighthart, Edward (1997). Archétype et symbole dans le style Louis XIV versaillais: réflexions sur l'imago rex et l'imago patriae au début de l'époque moderne. Doctoral thesis.
- Luynes, Charles-Philippe d'Albert, duc de (1860–1865). Mémoires sur la cour de Louis XV (1735-1758) (17 volumes). Paris : Firmin-Didot frères.
- Marie, Alfred; Marie, Jeanne (1984). Versailles au temps de Louis XV. Paris: Imprimerie Nationale.
- Mauricheau-Beaupré, Charles (1949). Versailles. Paris: Draeger et Veive.
- Monicart, Jean-Baptiste de (1720). Versailles immortalisé. Paris: E. Ganeau.
- Nolhac, Pierre de (1889). Le Château de Versailles au temps de Marie-Antoinette. Versailles: Aubert.
- Nolhac, Pierre de (1896). La Dauphine Marie-Antoinette. Paris: Boussod: Valadon.
- Nolhac, Pierre de (1900). Louis XV et Marie Leczinska. Paris: Manzi, Joyant et Cie.
- Nolhac, Pierre de (c. 1908). La Reine Marie-Antoinette. Paris: Calmann-Lévy.
- Nolhac, Pierre de (1926). Versailles au XVIIIe siècle. Paris: Louis Conard.
- Nolhac, Pierre de (1929). Versailles. Paris: A. Morancé.
- Nolhac, Pierre de (1930). Versailles et la cour de France: L'Art à Versailles. Paris: Louis Conard.
- Nolhac, Pierre de (1937). La Résurrection de Versailles, souvenirs d'un conservateur, 1887-1920. Paris: Plon.
- Paris, Isabelle, comtesse de (1992). Moi, Marie-Antoinette. Paris : R. Laffont.
- Petitfils, Jean-Christian (2005). Louis XVI. Paris: Perrin.
- Verlet, Pierre (1985). Le château de Versailles. Paris: Librairie Arthème Fayard.
- Zweig, Stefan (1933). Marie Antoinette: The Portrait of an average Woman. Trans. Eden and Cedar Paul. New York: Garden City Publishing Company, Inc.

Journals

- Fromageot, P. (1903). "Le château de Versailles en 1795 d'après le journal de Hugues Lagarde". Revue de l'Histoire de Versailles: 224–240.
- Jallut, Marguerite (1964). "Château de Versailles: Cabinets intérieurs et petits appartements de Marie-Antoinette". Gazette des Beaux-Arts. 63: 289–354.
- Jallut, Marguerite (1969). "Marie Leczinska et la peinture". Gazette des Beaux-Arts. 73: 305–322.
- Müntz de Raissac, Muriel (May 1993). "Richard Mique et les appartements de Marie-Antoinette à Versailles". Eighteenth Century Life. 17, n.s., 2: 207–219.
- Pons, Bruno (April 1992). "Jacques Verberckt (1704-1771), Sculpteur des Bâtiments du Roi". Gazette des Beaux-Arts. 119: 173–188.
- Verlet, Pierre (1937). "L'ancien mobilier de Versailles, son étude et ses méthodes". Gazette des Beaux-Arts. 17: 179–183.
