= Thomas Shearer =

18th-century English cabinet-maker

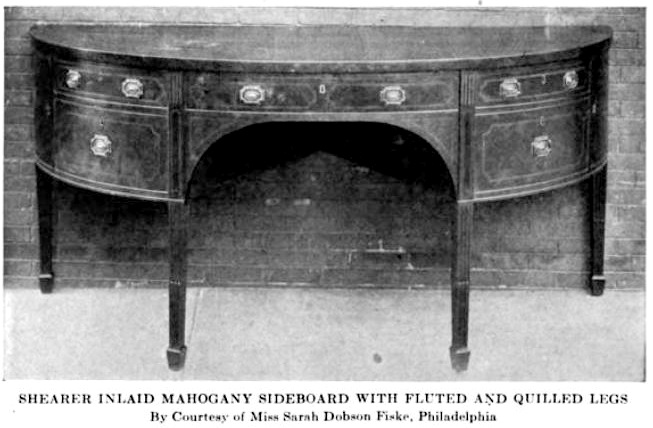
A Thomas Shearer mahogany sideboard

Thomas Shearer (fl. 1788) was an 18th-century English furniture designer and cabinet-maker.

Shearer was a craftsman and the author of most of the plates in The Cabinet Maker's London Book of Prices and Designs of Cabinet Work, issued in 1788 "for the London Society of Cabinet Makers." The majority of these plates were republished separately as Designs for Household Furniture. They exhibit their author as a man with an eye at once for simplicity of design and delicacy of proportion; some of his pieces possess a dainty and slender elegance which were a high mark in the history of English furniture.

There can be little doubt that Shearer exercised considerable influence over George Hepplewhite, with whom there is reason to suppose that he was closely associated, while Thomas Sheraton has recorded his admiration for work which has often been attributed to others. Shearer, in his turn, owes something to the Adam brothers, and something, no doubt, to the stock designs of his predecessors.

There is every reason to suppose that he worked at his craft with his own hands and that he was literally a cabinet-maker—so far as we know, he never made chairs. Much of the elegance of Shearer's work is due to his graceful and reticent employment of inlays of satinwood and other foreign woods. But he was as successful in form as in decoration, and no man ever used the curve to better purpose.

In Shearer's time the sideboard was in process of evolution; previously it had been a table with drawers, the pedestals and knife-boxes being separate pieces. He would seem to have been first to combine them into the familiar and often beautiful form they took at the end of the 18th century. The combination may have been made before, but his plate seemed to have been the first published document to show it.

Shearer, like many of his contemporaries, was much given to devising "harlequin" furniture. According to the Encyclopædia Britannica Eleventh Edition, "[h]e was a designer of high merit and real originality, and occupies a distinguished place among the little band of men, often, like himself, ill-educated and obscure of origin, who raised the English cabinet-making of the second half of the 18th century to an illustrious place in artistic history."
