= Commode =

Type of furniture (or toilet)

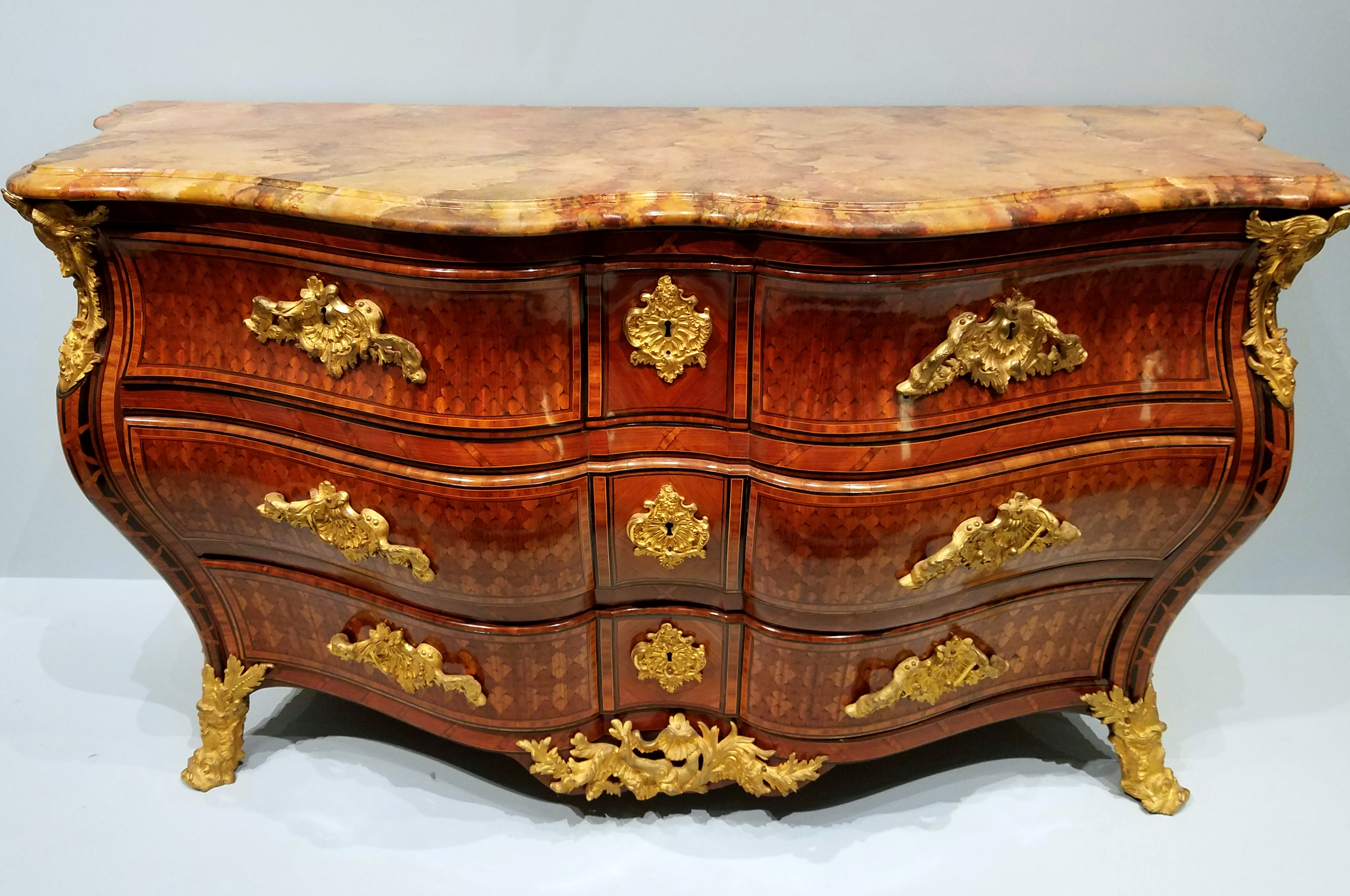
French commode, by Gilles Joubert, circa 1735, made of oak and walnut, veneered with tulipwood, ebony, holly, other woods, gilt bronze and imitation marble, in the Museum of Fine Arts (Boston, United States)

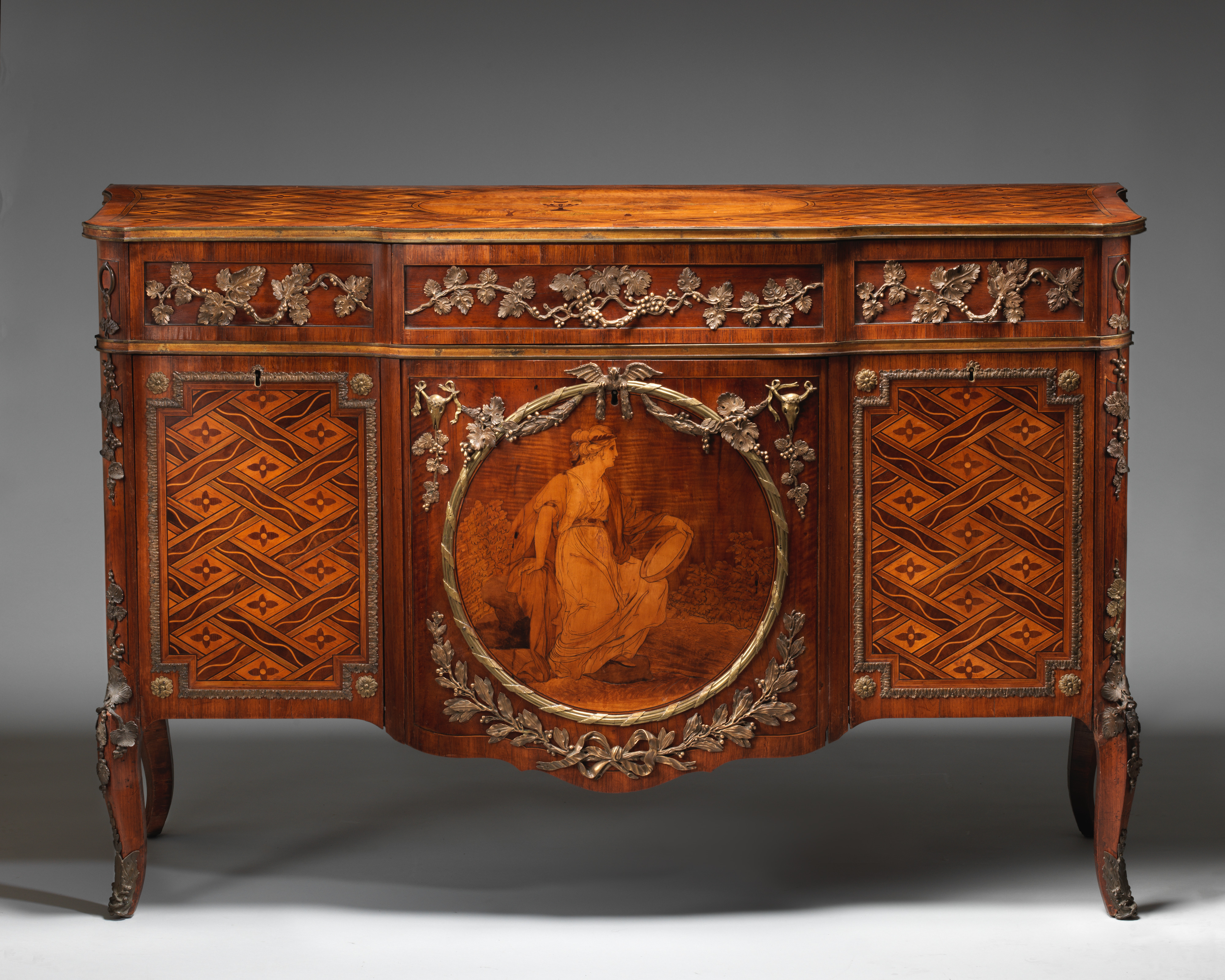
A British commode, circa 1772, marquetry of various woods, bronze and gilt-bronze mounts, overall: 95.9 by 145.1 by 51.9 centimetres (37.8 in × 57.1 in × 20.4 in), in the Metropolitan Museum of Art (New York City)

Commode is a term that may refer to multiple different pieces of furniture. The Oxford English Dictionary has multiple meanings of "commode". The first relevant definition reads: "A piece of furniture with drawers and shelves; in the bedroom, a sort of elaborate chest of drawers (so in French); in the drawing room, a large (and generally old-fashioned) kind of chiffonier."

Another meaning attested is a washstand, a piece of furniture equipped with basin, jug, and towel rail, and often with space to store the chamber pot behind closed doors. A washstand in the bedroom pre-dates indoor bathrooms and running water.

In British English, "commode" is the standard term for a commode chair, often on wheels, enclosing a chamber pot—as used in hospitals and assisted living homes. In the United States, a "commode" is now a colloquial synonym for a flush toilet.

The word commode comes from the French word for "convenient" or "suitable", which in turn comes from the Latin adjective commodus, with similar meanings.

== History and types ==
=== France ===
The term originates in the vocabulary of French furniture from about 1700. At that time, a commode meant a cabinet or chest of drawers, low enough so that it sat at the height of the dado rail (à hauteur d'appui). It was a piece of veneered case furniture much wider than it was high, raised on high or low legs.

Commodes were made by ébénistes; the French word for "cabinet-maker" is derived from ebony, a black tropical hardwood notable as a foreign luxury. The beautiful wood was complemented with ormolu (gilt-bronze drawer pulls). The piece of furniture would be provided with a marble slab top selected to match the marble of the chimneypiece.

A commode occupied a prominent position in the room for which it was intended: it stood against the pier between the windows, in which case it would often be surmounted by a mirror glass, or a pair of identical commodes would flank the chimneypiece or occupy the center of each end wall.

Bombé commodes, with surfaces shaped in three dimensions, were a feature of the rococo style called Louis Quinze. Rectilinear neoclassical, or Louis Seize, commodes might have such deep drawers or doors that the feet were en toupie—in the tapering turned shape of a child's spinning top. Both rococo and neoclassical commodes might have cabinets flanking the main section, in which case such a piece was a commode à encoignures; pairs of encoignures or corner-cabinets might also be designed to complement a commode and stand in the flanking corners of a room. If a commode had open shelves flanking the main section it was a commode à l'anglaise; if it did not have enclosing drawers it was a commode à vantaux.

Before the mid-eighteenth century the commode had become such a necessary article of furniture that it might be made in menuiserie (carpentry), of solid painted oak, walnut or fruitwoods, with carved decoration, typical of French provincial furniture.

=== England ===
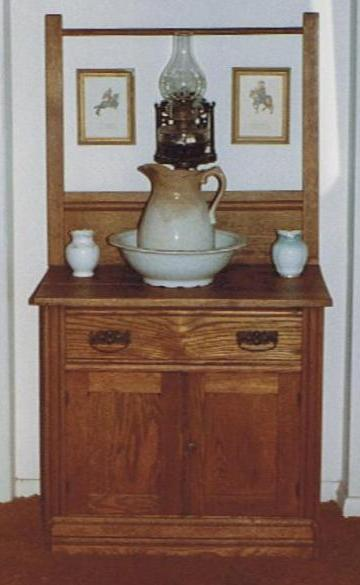
A washstand with pitcher (jug) and towel rack, sometimes known as a commode.

In the English-speaking world, commode passed into cabinet-makers' parlance in London by the mid-eighteenth century to describe chests of drawers with gracefully curved fronts, and sometimes with shaped sides as well, perceived as being in the "French" taste. Thomas Chippendale employed the term "French Commode Tables" to describe designs in The Cabinet-Maker and Upholsterer's Director (1753), and Ince and Mayhew illustrated a "Commode Chest of drawers", plate xliii, in their Universal System of Household Furniture, 1759–62. John Gloag notes that Commode expanded to describe any piece of furniture with a serpentine front, such as a dressing table, or even a chair seat. Gloag points out that Thomas Shearer's designs for two "commode dressing chests" illustrated in The Cabinet-Makers' London Book of Prices, 1788, plate 17, are repeated, but as "serpentine dressing chests", in The Prices of Cabinet Work, 1797 edition.

== Toilet ==
In British English, "commode" is the standard term for a commode chair, often on wheels, enclosing a chamber pot—as used in hospitals and the homes of disabled persons. (The historic equivalent is the close stool, hence the coveted and prestigious position Groom of the Stool for a courtier close to the monarch.) This piece of furniture is termed in French a chaise percée ("pierced chair"); similar items were made specifically as moveable bidets for washing.

In the United States, a "commode" is a colloquial synonym for a flush toilet particularly in the American South.

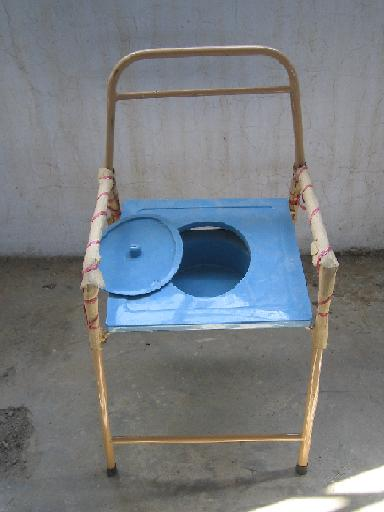
A commode chair from Pakistan

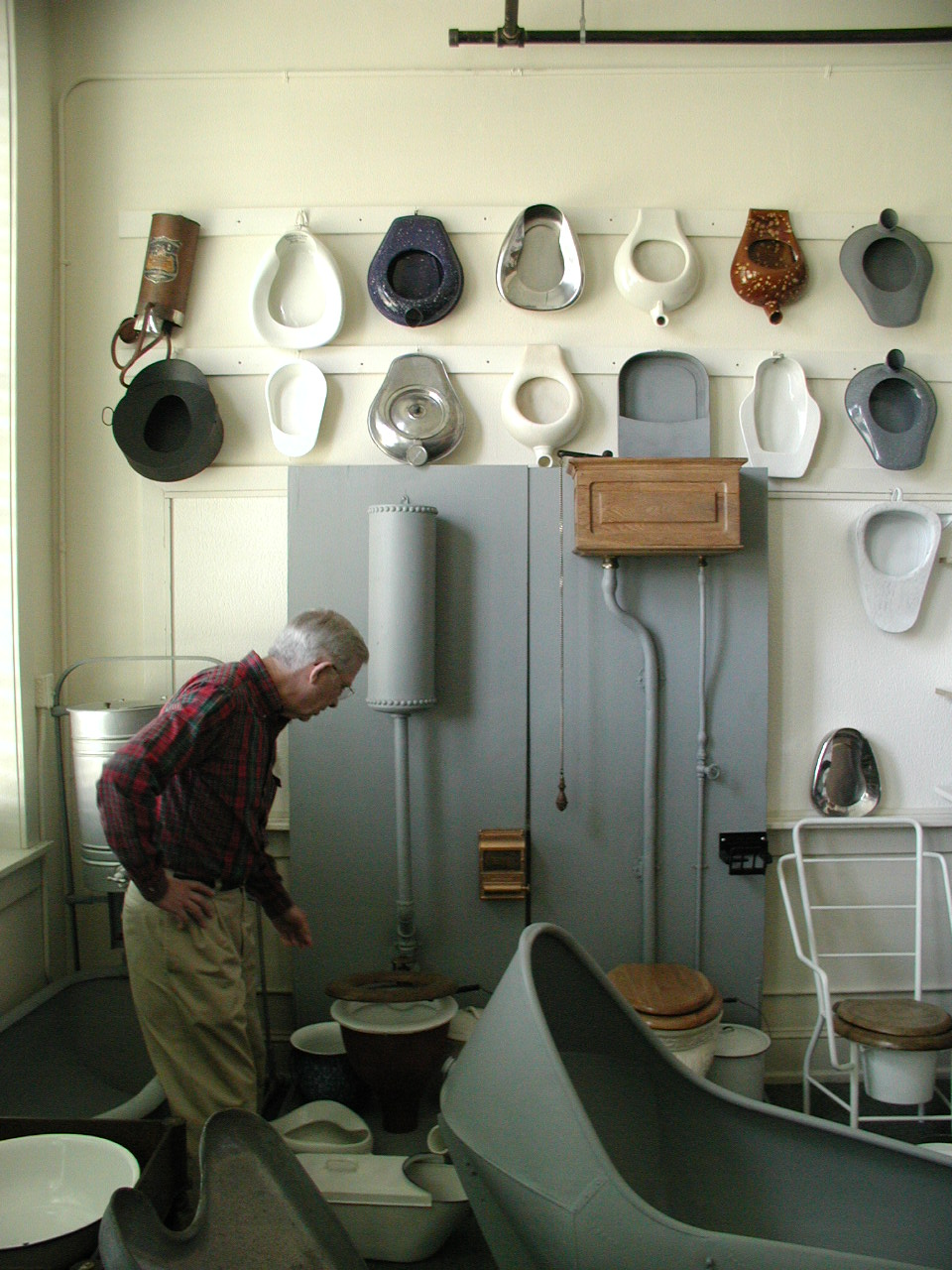
Museum collection of toilets, bed pans, hip baths, etc. The modern toilet commode is on the right.

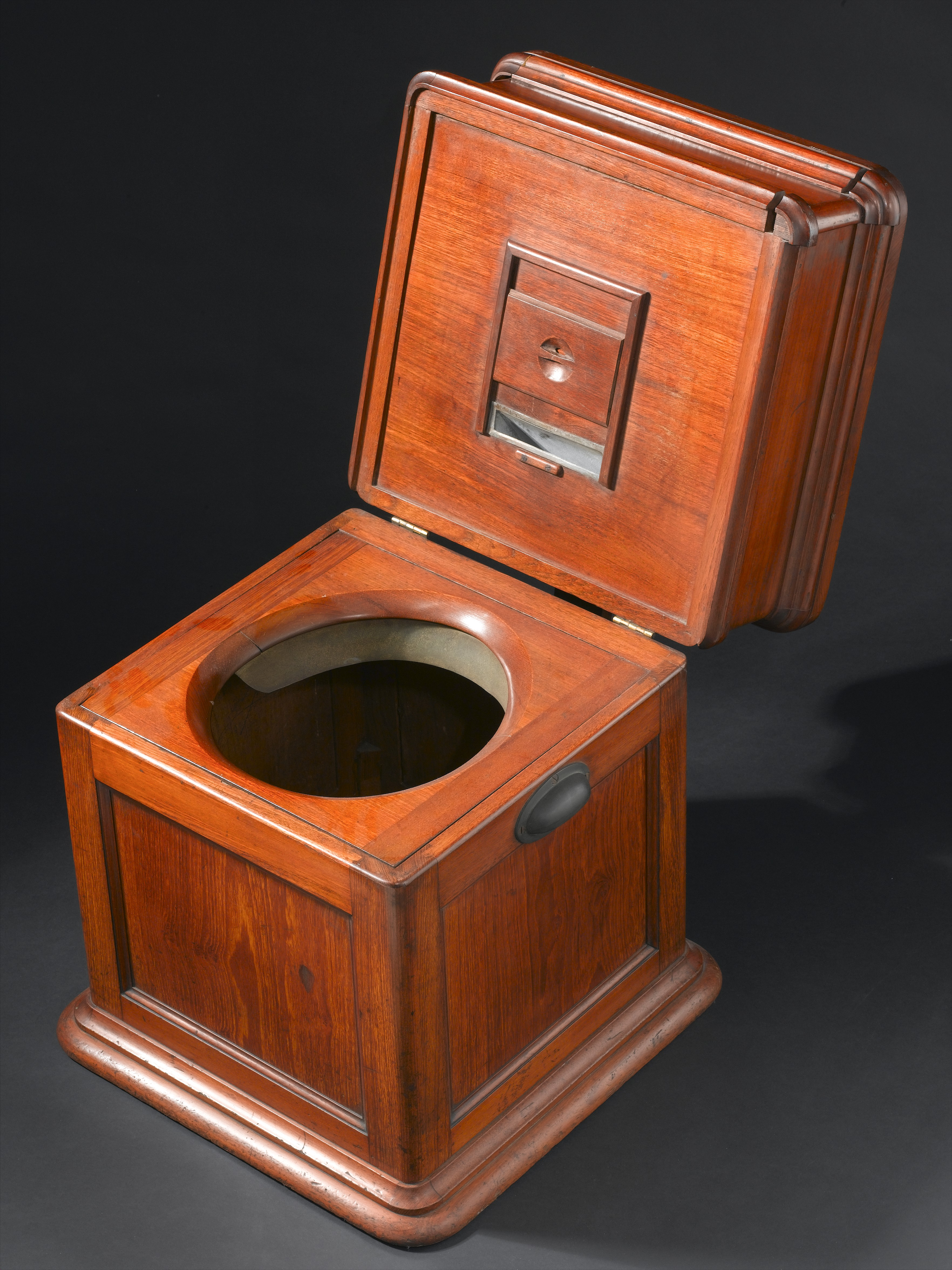
19th century heavy wooden toilet commode

== See also ==
- Lowboy and highboy
- Nightstand, a small table or similar next to a bed
