= Adrien Delorme =

French cabinetmaker

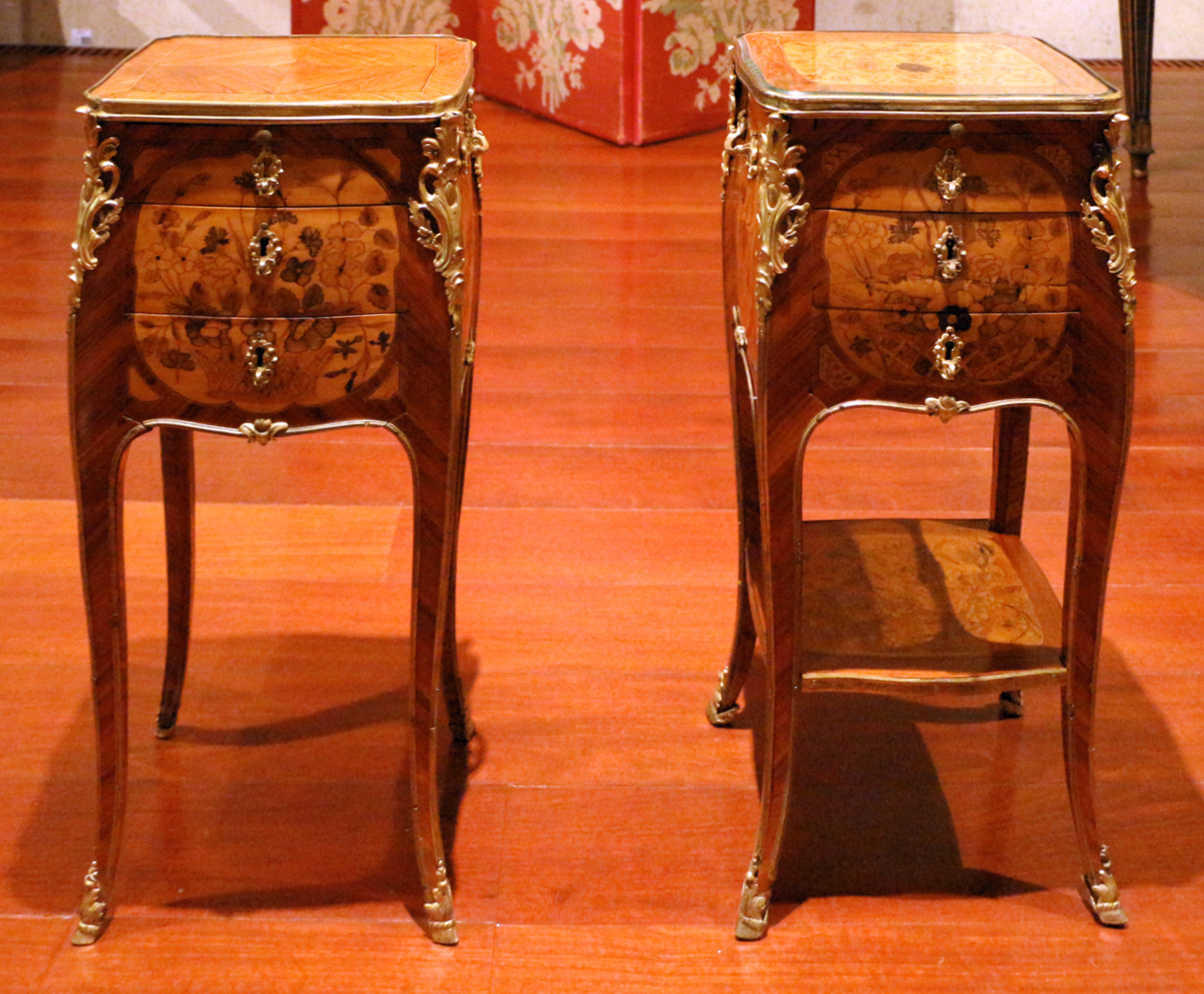
Adriem Faizelot-Delorme bedside tables in the Calouste Gulbenkian Museum

Adrien Faizelot-Delorme (master in 1748 – after 1783) was a well-known cabinetmaker (ébéniste) working in Paris, the most prominent in a family of ébénistes.

Becoming master 22 June 1748, he set up in the rue du Temple, a centrally located site where fashionable clients could find him, for he worked as a dealer in furniture as well as running his own workshop; as dealer, his stamp is often found on pieces made by other ébénistes. His own furniture featured fine marquetry and lacquered furniture.

In 1783 Delorme sold his remaining stock at public auction and retired from business.
