= Jean-François Leleu =

French furniture-maker

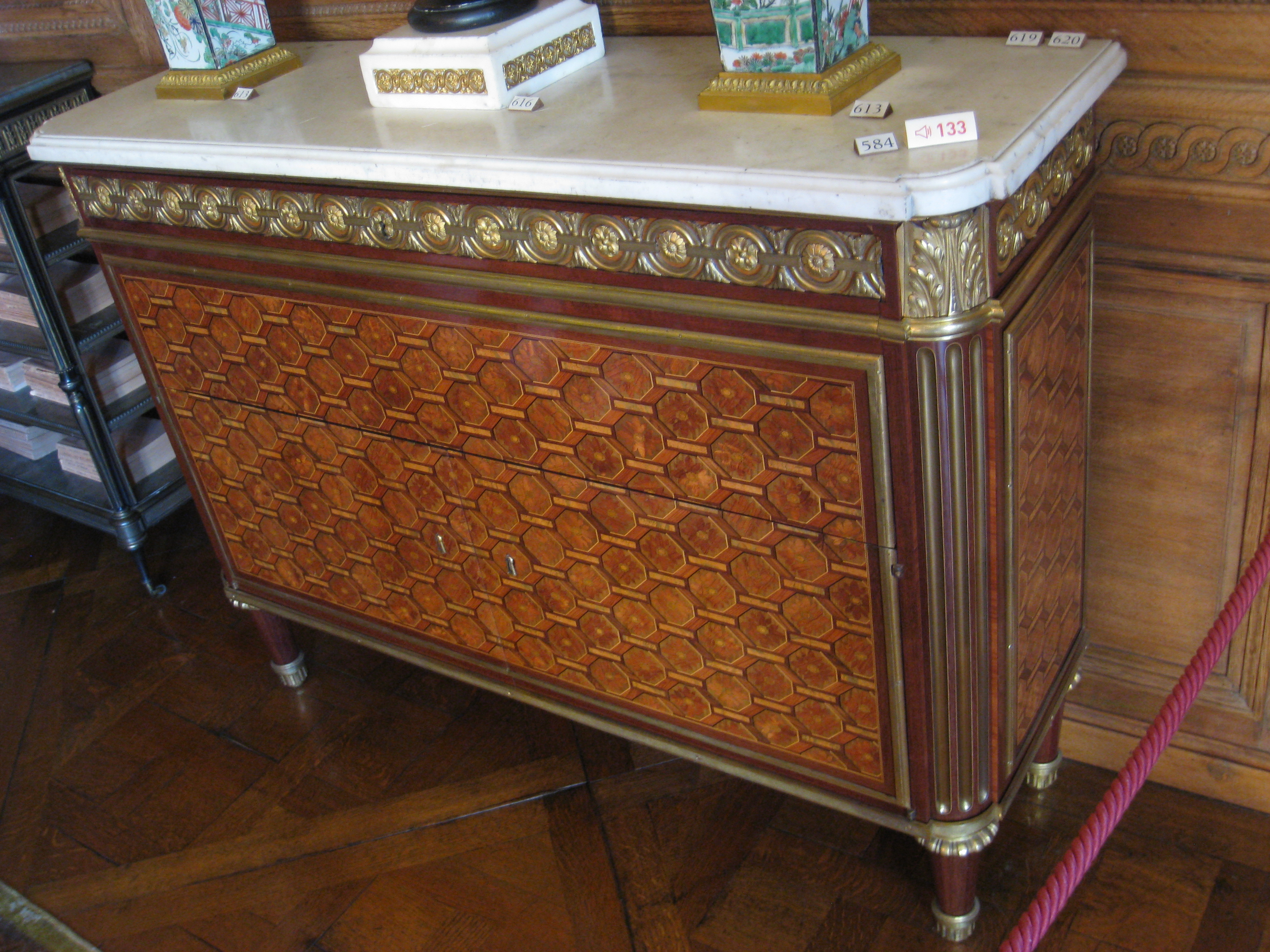
Secretaire an abattant, by Jean-François Leleu circa 1770-1780.

Jean-François Leleu (1729–1807) was a leading French furniture-maker (ébéniste) of the eighteenth century who was trained alongside his rival Jean-Henri Riesener, in the workshop of Jean-François Oeben (1721-1763). After his master's death, he became the workshop's lead and became a master ébéniste in 1764. Leleu had the patronage of wealthy aristocrats, including the Prince de Condé, Louis-Joseph de Bourbon. His furniture was known for its high quality, elegance, and restraint, with inlays of diamonds, roses, or floral bouquets. When working for marchands-merciers, he also used inlays of Sèvres porcelain and lacquer. Leleu's clients included Louis Joseph, Prince of Condé and Madame du Barry.
