= Ébéniste =

French loan-word meaning "cabinet-maker"

An ébéniste (pronounced [ebenist]) is a cabinet-maker, particularly one who works in ebony. The term is a loanword from French and translates to "ebonist".

== Etymology and ambiguities ==
As opposed to ébéniste, the term menuisier denotes a woodcarver or chairmaker in French. The English equivalent for ébéniste, "ebonist", is not commonly used. Originally, an ébéniste was one who worked with ebony, a favoured luxury wood for mid-17th century Parisian cabinets, originating in imitation of elite furniture being made in Antwerp. The word is 17th-century in origin. Early Parisian ébénistes often came from the Low Countries themselves; an outstanding example is Pierre Gole, who worked at the Gobelins manufactory making cabinets and table tops veneered with marquetry, the traditional enrichment of ébénisterie, or "cabinet-work".

== History ==
Ébénistes make case furniture, either veneered or painted. Under Parisian guild regulations, painted varnishes, generically called vernis Martin, were applied in separate workshops, sawdust being an enemy to freshly varnished surfaces. During the French Revolution the guilds in Paris and elsewhere were abolished (1791), and with them went all their regulations. As one result of this, Parisian chairmakers were able to produce veneered chairs, just as London furniture-makers, less stringently ruled, had been able to make since the production of the first chairs with splats shortly before 1720, in imitation of Chinese chairs.

Because of this amalgamation of trades, makers of chairs and of other seat furniture began to use veneering techniques, formerly the guarded privilege of ébénistes. This privilege became less distinct after the relaxation of guild rules of the Ancien Régime, and after the French Revolution's abolition of guilds in 1791. Seat furniture in the Empire style was often veneered with mahogany, and later in pale woods also.

From the mid-19th century onward, the two French trades, ébéniste and menuisier, often combined under the single roof of a "furnisher", and the craft began to make way for the industry. In Germany in Frommern a line of high polished production take up the ideas of the royal Hofebenist

From the mid-17th century through the 18th century, a notable number of ébénistes of German and Low Countries extraction were pre-eminent among Parisian furniture-makers, as the abbreviated list below suggests.

== Some 17th- and 18th-century Parisian ébénistes ==
- Joseph Baumhauer
- Pierre-Antoine Bellange
- Guillaume Beneman
- André-Charles Boulle
- Jacques-Philippe Carel
- Martin Carlin
- Mathieu Criaerd
- Adrien Delorme
- François-Honoré-Georges Jacob-Desmalter
- Pierre Garnier
- Antoine Gaudreau
- Jean-Pierre Latz
- Jean-François Leleu
- Pierre Macret
- Bernard Molitor
- Roger Vandercruse Lacroix
- Jean-François Oeben
- Jean Oppenord
- Jean-Henri Riesener
- Bernard II van Risamburgh
- Adam Weisweiler

== Later French ébénistes ==
- Henry Dasson
- François Linke
- Louis Majorelle
- Émile-Jacques Ruhlmann

== German Ebenists, or Kunstschreiner ==
- Rudolf Gambs, St. Petersburg, Karlsruhe
- Wilhelm Kimbel
- Klinckerfuß Johannes (1770–1831) 1790 Württemberg
- Friedrich Wirth (Entrepreneur) (1806–1883) 1857 Württemberg
- Wilhelm Wirth (Entrepreneur) (1837–1917) Württemberg

== Ébénistes outside France ==
- Gabriele Capello (Turin)
- Christopher Fuhrlohg (London)
- Mathäus Funk (Bern)
- Gerrit Jensen (London)
- Georg Haupt (Stockholm)
- Pierre Langlois (London)
- Charles-Honoré Lannuier (New York)
- Abdelkader Saaidi (Casablanca)
- Pietro Piffetti (Turin)
- Abraham Roentgen (Neuwied)
- David Roentgen (Neuwied)
- Decon Brodie (Edinburgh)
- Thomas Elfe (Born in London, established in Charleston)

== See also ==
- List of furniture designers
- List of furniture types
- Woodworking
