= Vernis Martin =

Style of lacquering named after the Martin brothers

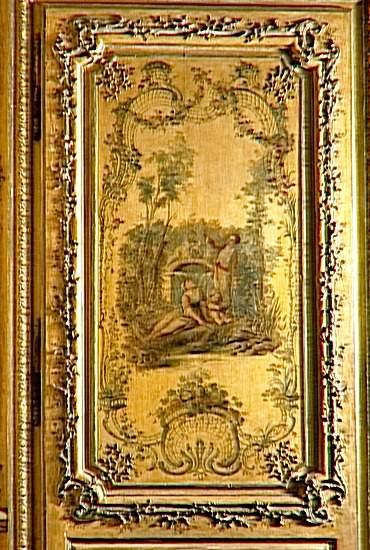
Vernis Martin boiserie, in the boudoir of the Dauphine Marie-Josèphe de Saxe, Versailles

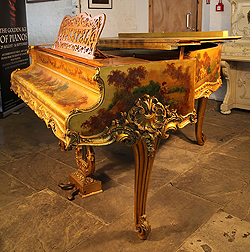
Pleyel Piano made in 1903 in Louis XV style Vernis Martin case with Watteauesque scenes

In French interior design, vernis Martin is a type (or a number of types) of japanning or imitation lacquer named after the 18th century French Martin brothers: Guillaume (died 1749), Etienne-Simon, Robert and Julien. They ran a leading factory from between about 1730 and 1770, and were vernisseurs du roi ("varnishers to the king"). But they did not invent the process, nor were they the only producers, nor does the term cover a single formula or technique. It imitated Chinese lacquer and European subjects, and was applied to a wide variety of items, from furniture to coaches. It is said to have been made by heating oil and copal and then adding Venetian turpentine.

Oriental lacquer had speedily acquired high favour in France, and many attempts were made to imitate it. Some of these attempts were passably successful, and it is likely that many of the examples in the possession of Louis XIV at his death were of European manufacture. Chinese lacquer was, however, imported in large quantities, and sometimes panels were made in China from designs prepared in Paris.

Biographical details of the career of the brothers Martin are scanty, but it is known that Guillaume, the eldest, was already in business in 1724. Their method and work must have come rapidly into vogue, for in 1730 Guillaume and Simon Martin were granted by letters patent a twenty years' monopoly, subsequently renewed, of making "toutes sortes d'ouvrages en relief de la Chine et du Japon" ("all kinds of relief works from China and Japan"). At the height of their fame the brothers directed at least three factories in Paris, and in 1748 they were all classed together as a "Manufacture nationale." One of them was still in existence in 1785.

The literature of their day had much to say of the Martin brothers. In Voltaire's comedy Nadine, produced in 1749, mention is made of a berline (carriage) "bonne et brillante, tous les panneaux par Martin sont vernis" ("good and bright, all the panels varnished by Martin"). The Marquis de Mirabeau in L'Ami des hommes refers to the enamelled snuff-boxes and varnished carriages which came from the Martins' factory. As with many great artists, their names were attached to many works they never saw, and the Martins suffered considerably in this respect. That the quality of their production varied between very wide limits is established by existing and undoubted examples; but it is extremely improbable that even their three factories could have turned out the quantity of examples that has been attributed to them. Yet their production was large and miscellaneous, for such was the rage for their lacquer that it was applied to every possible object.

The fashion was not confined to France. At its best Vernis Martin has a sheen, polish, and translucence which compel admiration. Every variety of Asian lacquer of the Far East was imitated and often improved upon by the Martins—the black with raised gold ornaments, the red, and finally in the green ground, powdered with gold, they reached the high-water mark of their art. This delicate work, poudré and wavy-lined with gold or semi with flowers overlaid with transparent enamel, is seen at its best on small boxes, fans, needle-cases and such-like. Of the larger specimens from the Martins' factories many have disappeared, or been cut up into decorative panels. It would appear that none of the work they placed in the famous hotels of old Paris is now in situ, and the really fine examples are in museums. Even the decorations of the apartments of the Dauphin at the Palace of Versailles, executed, or at least begun, in 1749, have vanished; so have those at the Château de Bellevue.

Critics have accepted that of the four brothers Robert Martin accomplished the most original and the most completely artistic work. He left a son, Jean Alexandre, who described himself in 1767 as Vernisseur du Roi de Prusse ("varnisher to the king of Prussia"). He was employed at the palace of Sanssouci, but failed to continue the great traditions of his father and his uncles. The French Revolution finally extinguished a taste which had lasted for a large part of the 18th century.
