= Corporation des Menuisiers-Ébénistes =

French woodworking guild

The Corporation des Menuisiers-Ébénistes was a French craft guild which was concerned with the profession of woodworking.
