= Tent bed =

Tent bed is a bed with a temporary tent-like cover to maintain warmth in colder periods or emergencies.

Tent beds can be improvised using common camping tents indoors or purchased as special indoor or bed tents to be mounted to normal beds.

Bed tents were widely used in South Korea in winter 2013 while nuclear plant shutdowns caused surging energy prices.

== See also ==
- Canopy bed
- Camp bed
