= Skirt (disambiguation) =

Skirt is the lower part of a dress or gown, or an outer garment serving this purpose.

Skirt or Skirts may also refer to:

== Arts, entertainment, and media ==
- "Skirt" (song), a 2013 by Kylie Minogue
- Skirts (film), a 1921 American silent comedy film
- Skirts (TV series), a 1990 Australian television series

== Underwater diving ==
- Skirt, the body of a diving mask providing a watertight seal between the lens and the face
- Skirts, the jacket and trouser waistbands of a two-piece dry suit overlapped and rolled together to provide a watertight seal

== Other uses ==
- Bed skirt, a piece of decorative fabric that is placed between the mattress and the box spring of a bed
- Piston skirt: the lower part of the curved surface of a piston in a piston engine, below the grooves for piston rings
- Skirt, the part of a hovercraft that inflates with air allowing the craft to hover
- Skirt steak, a cut of beef steak
