= Bed skirt =

Bedding accessory; piece of decorative fabric

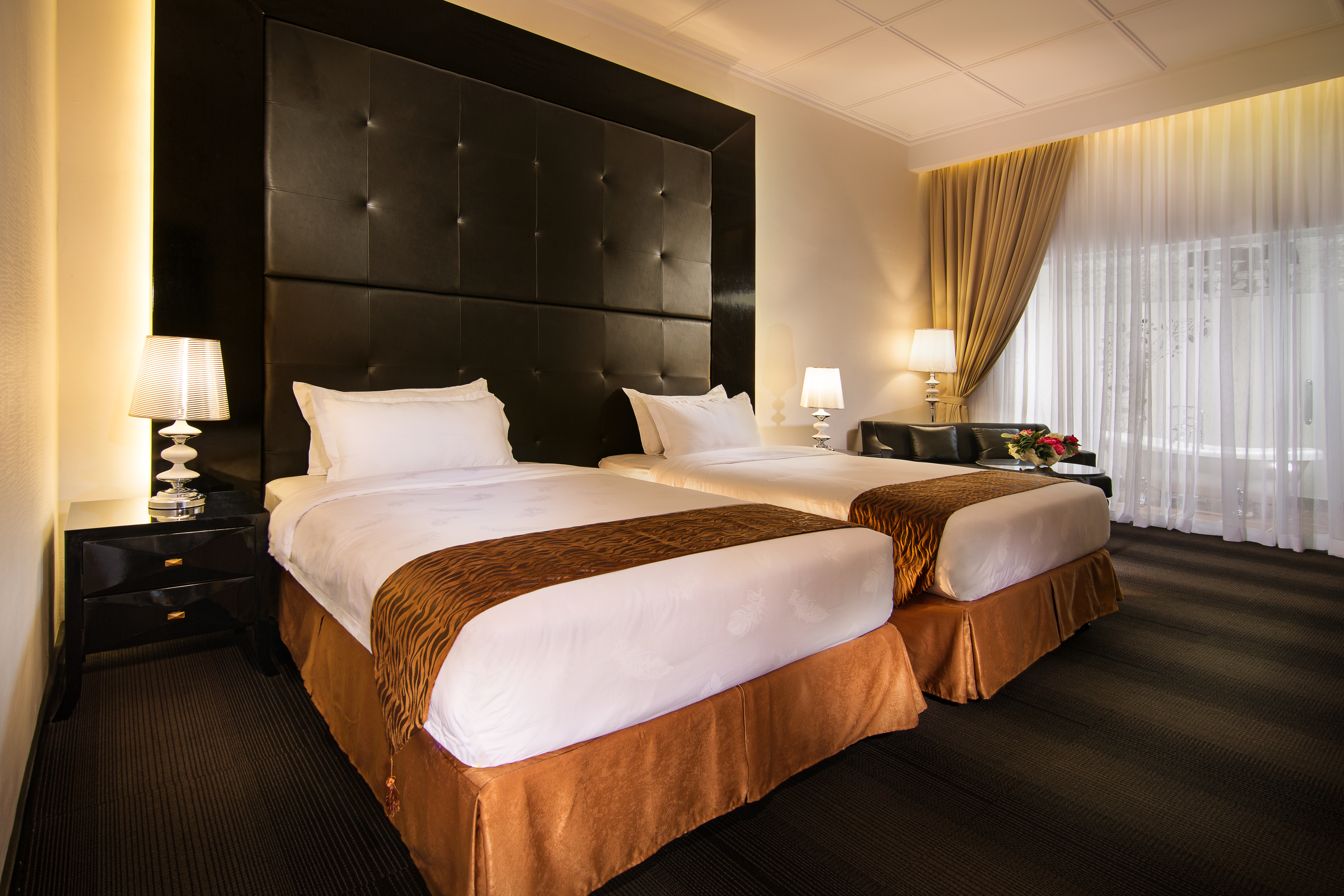
Modern beds with valances.

A bed skirt, sometimes spelled bedskirt, a bed ruffle, a dust ruffle in North America, a valance, or a valance sheet in the British Isles, is a piece of decorative fabric that is placed between the mattress and the box spring of a bed that extends to the floor around the sides. In addition to its aesthetics, a bed skirt is used to hide the ensemble fabric, wheels and other unsightly objects underneath the bed, or as protection against dust.

Popularized in the early 20th century, though dating back to the late 18th century in their earliest usage, valances were strictly utilitarian up until the 1930s and 1940s, when many women began to lavishly decorate their bedrooms. For about a century, bed skirts have been considered as intrinsic pieces of bedding and as crucial as the bedcover itself. Bed skirts generally measure between 14 inches (36 cm) and 16 inches (41 cm) in their drop.

== History ==
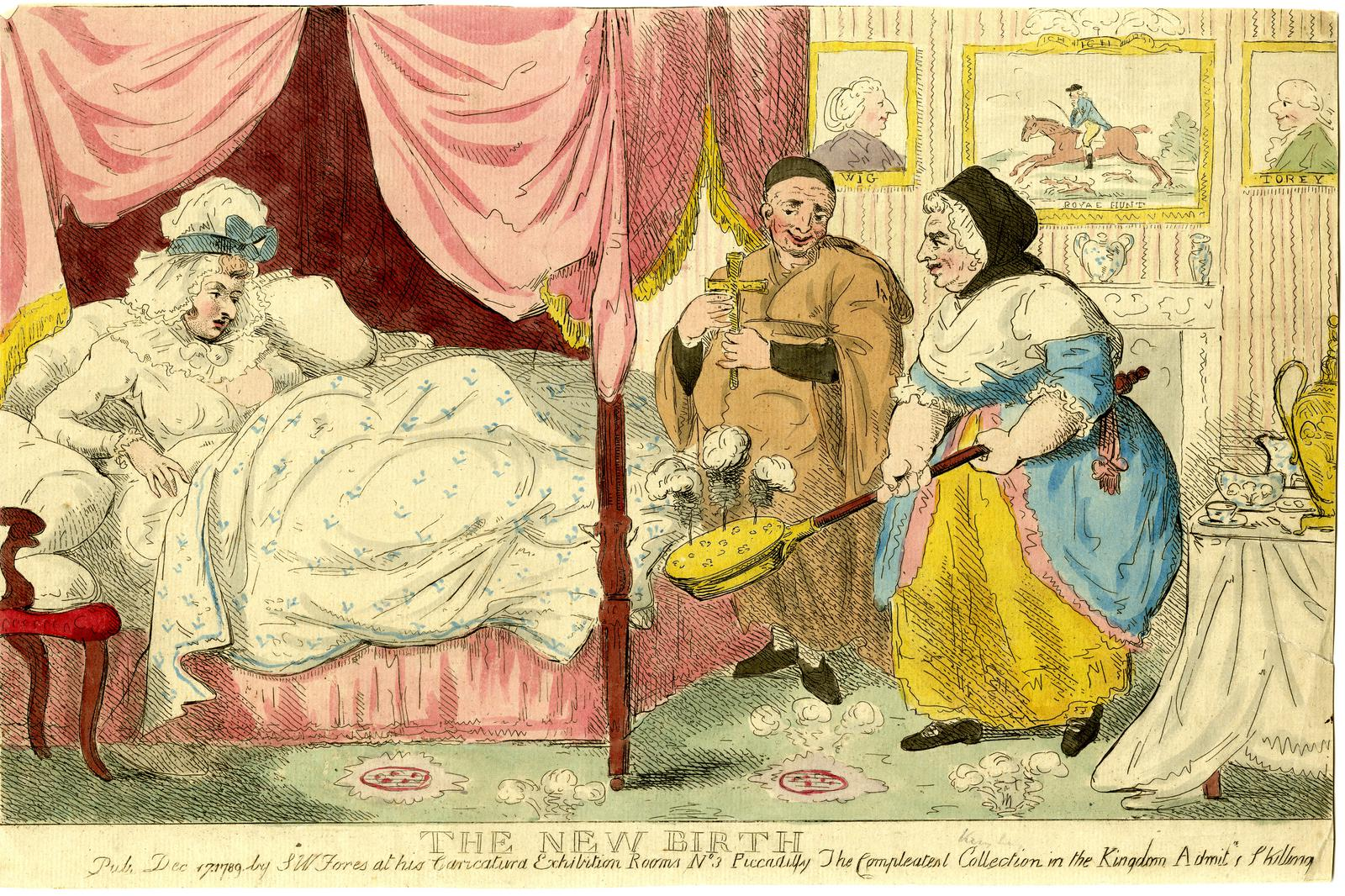
Artwork displaying a Polish bed with a pink valance, 1789.

Although bed skirts became more generally used from the early 1900s, artworks of bedrooms in the Regency, Georgian and Victorian eras displayed beds with fancy valances, typically in upper class or royal settings.

In the early 1900s, conventional cotton and coil mattresses with coordinated box springs supplanted wool or feather-filled mattresses. Valances were initially used to block drafts which could chill the undersides of beds (from the floor upwards). They were also used to conceal box springs, bed frames and badly shaped bed posts. Furthermore, people who had bed skirts discovered that bed bugs and dust mites were a minor issue in their homes as the valance averted dust.

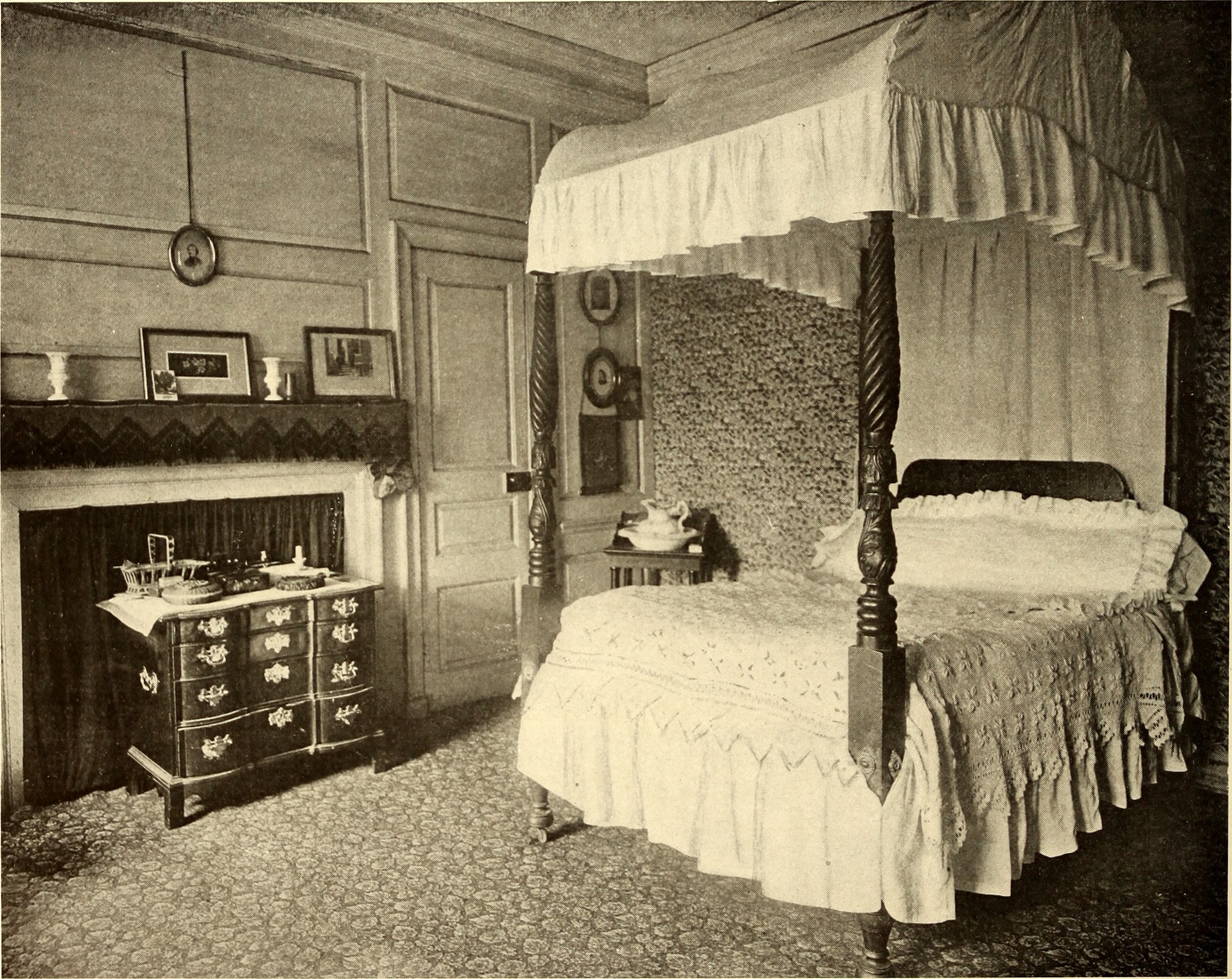
A traditional bed set with a valance, 1905.

Between the 1920s and 1930s, people adorned beds with more choices than ever, where traditional bedding components began to include valances. In the 1940s, the bedspread and valance was popular. In children's rooms, the valances stored or hid toys and assorted items beneath the bed.

Up until the 1960s, fabrics and materials such as cotton, satin, chiffon, and wool were fashionable bed skirt cloths. Towards the 1970s and 1980s, the term "dust ruffles" was superseded by "bed skirt". From the 1980s and onwards, valances were still pivotal to the bedroom's general décor.

In recent years, tailored, or pleated bed skirts have become more efficient. Springmaid, Martha Stewart, Sears, JCPenney and Laura Ashley were some bed skirt-making brands popular with consumers within the last three decades. By the late 2010s, valance styles such as ruching, lace, and ruffle declined in use as minimalists popularized the straight bed skirt. More recently, mattresses are getting thicker in size and therefore bed skirts are becoming more uncommon, as such bulky mattresses tend to touch the floor.

== Purpose ==
Valances can preserve the bed by keeping it from coming into contact with the floor. They can act as a buffer to preserve the unity of linens and bedding, since continual friction between the bed and the ground may lead to tearing or wearing down of material; therefore sheets and bedspreads will reduce quality over time. They are also used to prevent dust and allergens from accumulating under the bed, particularly by those who suffer from respiratory problems.

Aesthetically, the valance's function is to provide a snazzy look to a bed, in addition to reducing exposure to the box spring, assorted items, clutter or any space beneath the bed that can be used for storage. Embellished bed boots may be used to conceal bed posts and improve the décor when the bed skirts do not reach the floor. Valances can also be used to increase the aesthetics of the bedroom that complements the surrounding decoration. Some bed skirts can also be adjusted, depending on the size of the mattresses.

== Types ==
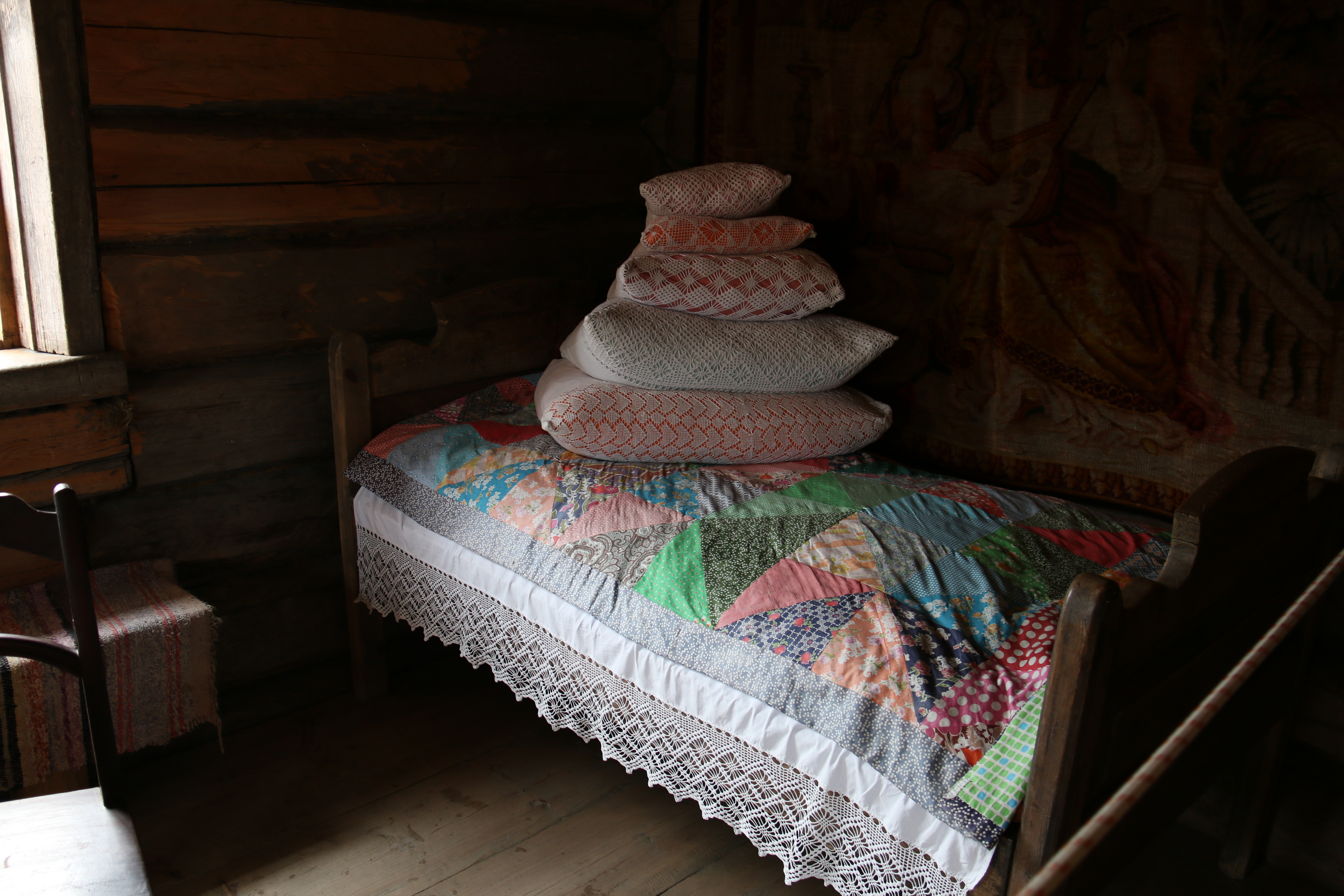
A bed with a laced valance in Irkutsk, Russia

There are three types of bed skirts:

- Traditional bed skirts, which are generally straight-pieced, tailored fabric that will fit around the circumference of the mattress and box spring, where they reach the floor.
- Box pleat valances, which have pleats at the corners and sides, giving the bed skirt a tailored appearance in a formal bedding setting.
- The wraparound bed skirt requires lifting the mattress for installation, as they feature an elasticized design that wraps around the box spring without removing the mattress.

Generally, there exists a base valance; which is placed below the mattress and covers the bottom of the bed. And a sheet valance; which is fitted over the mattress, where it acts as both a fitted sheet and a bed skirt.

== Gallery ==
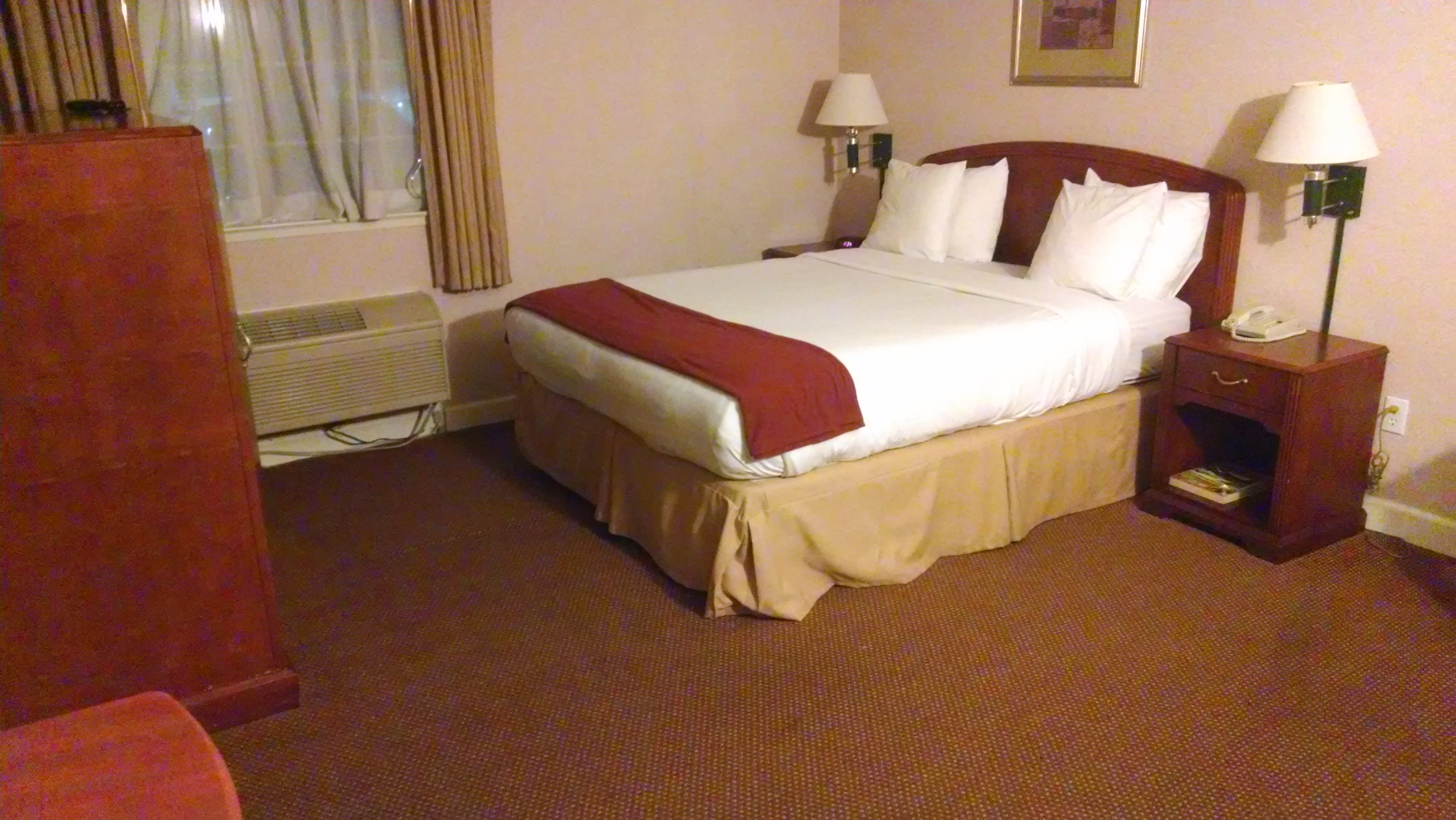
A queen sized bed with a straight valance, Los Altos, California

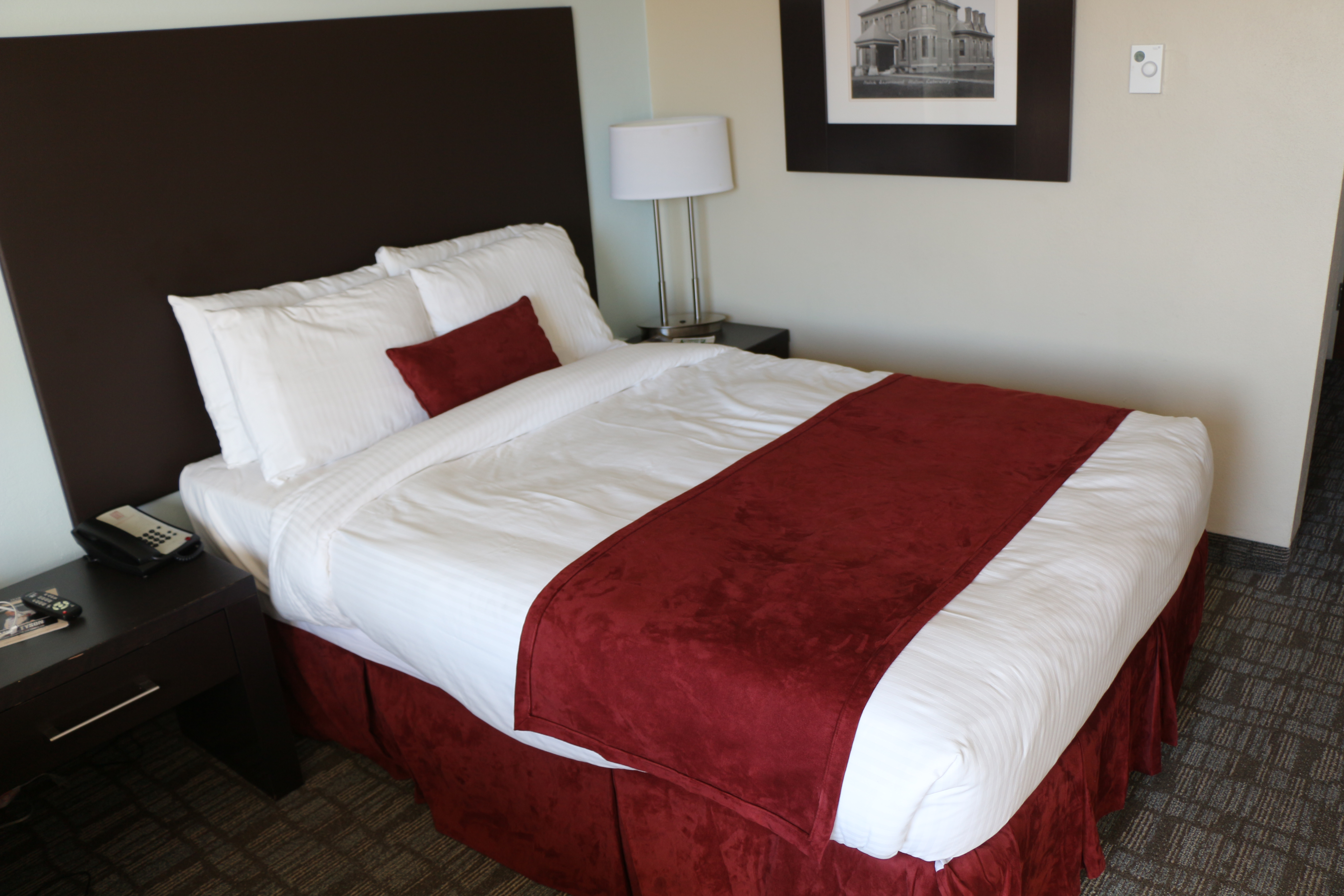
Modern queen size bed with a red valance, University of Massachusetts Amherst Hotel, Massachusetts

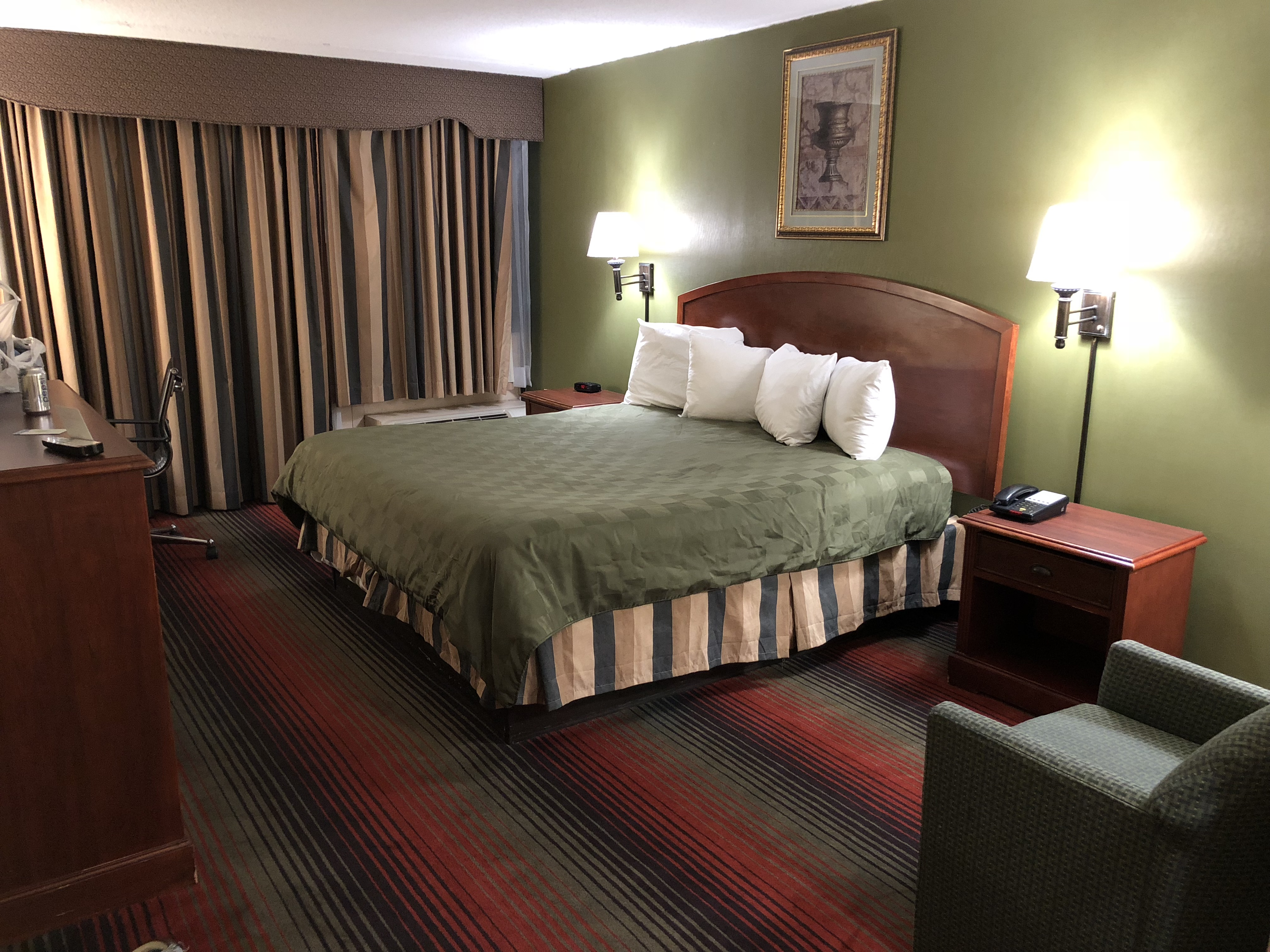
Modern king size bed with a patterned valance, Rochelle Park, New Jersey

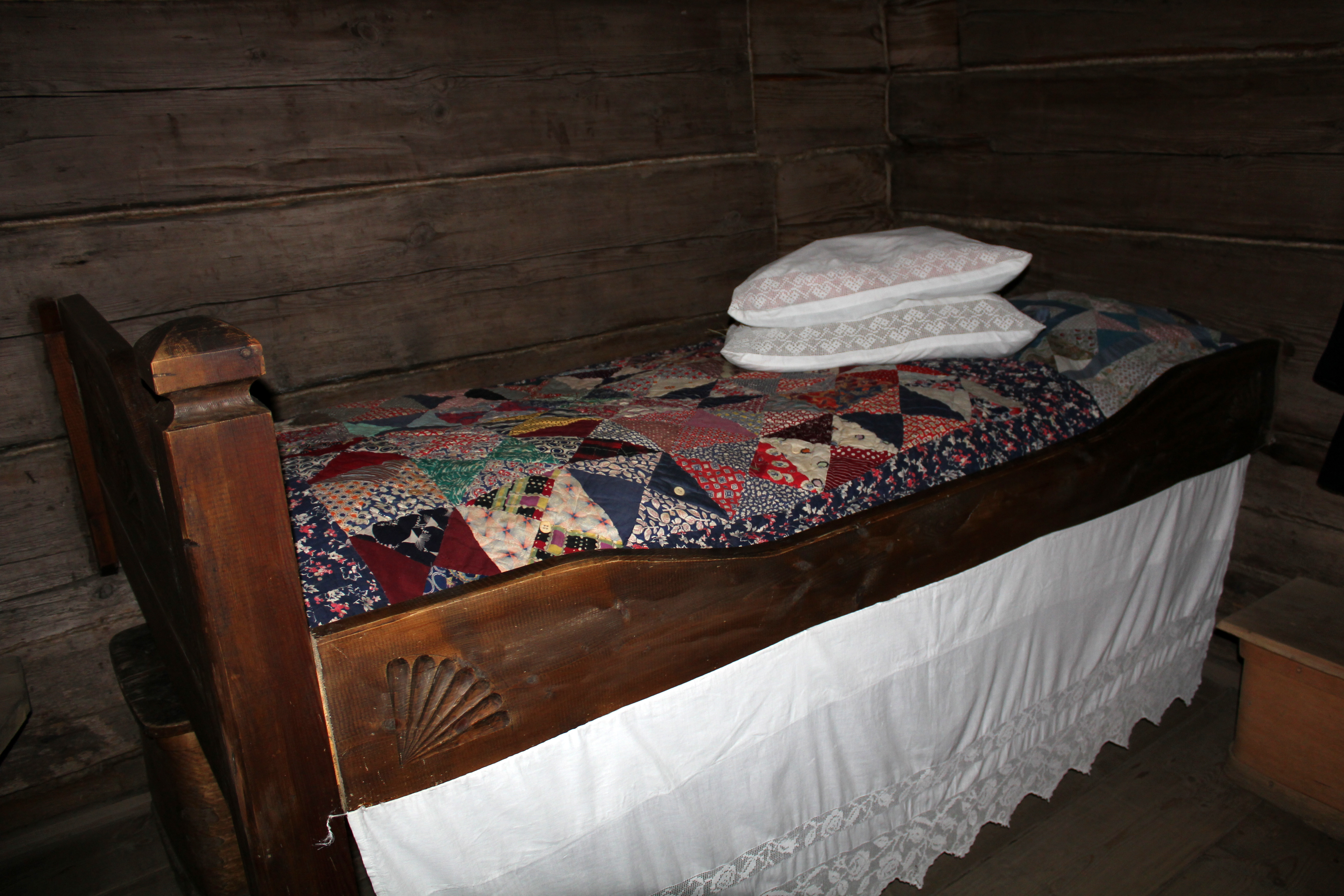
Laced valance on a single bed, Museum of Wooden Architecture, Suzdal, Russia

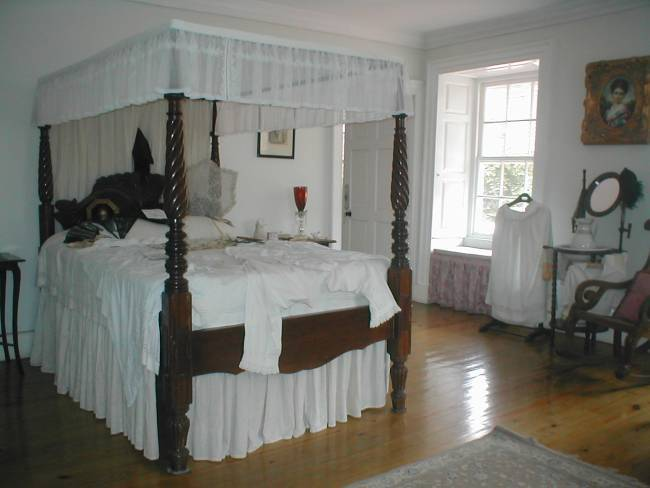
Traditional laced bed skirt, Sunbury, England

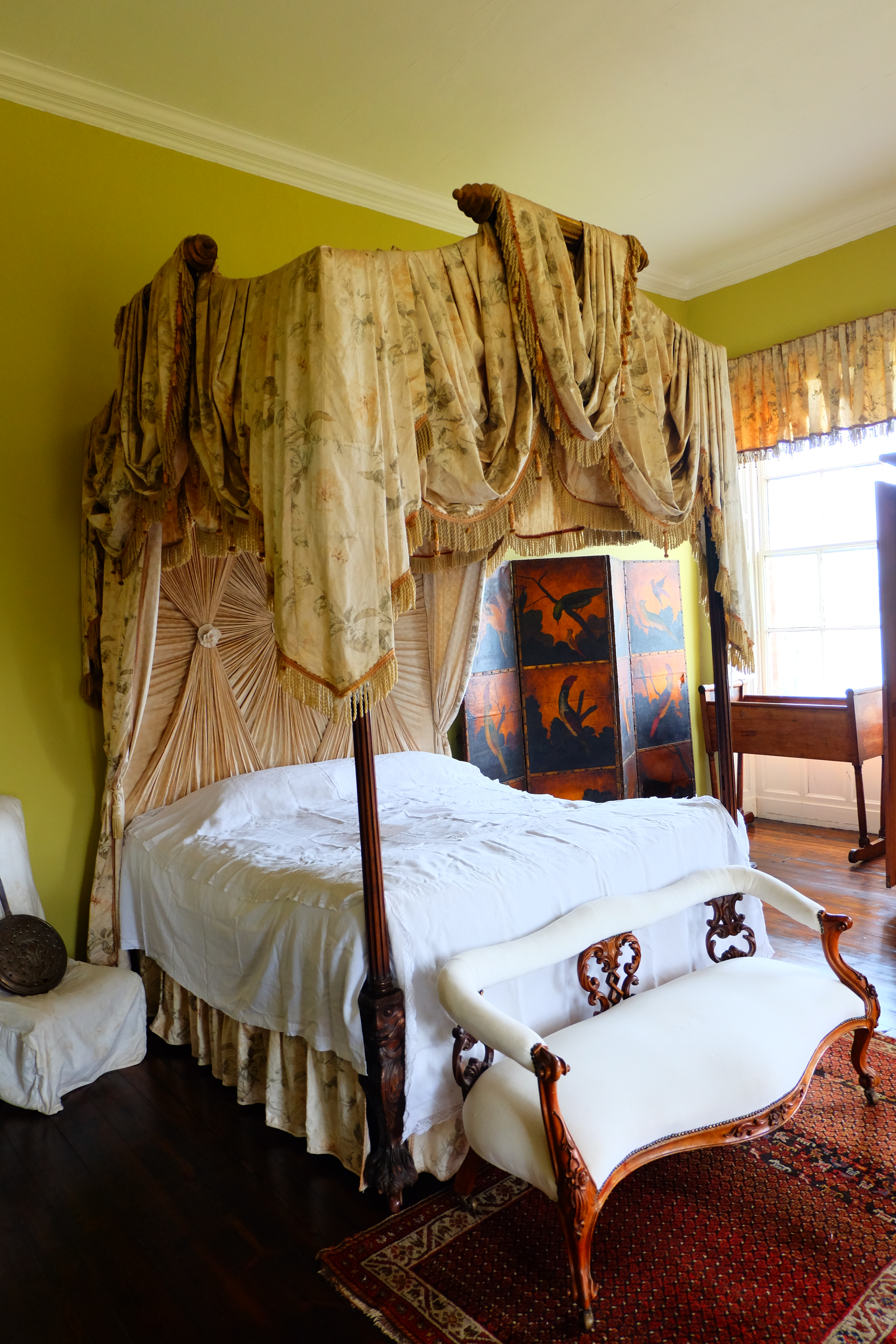
A Polish bed with a ruffled valance, Bantry, Ireland

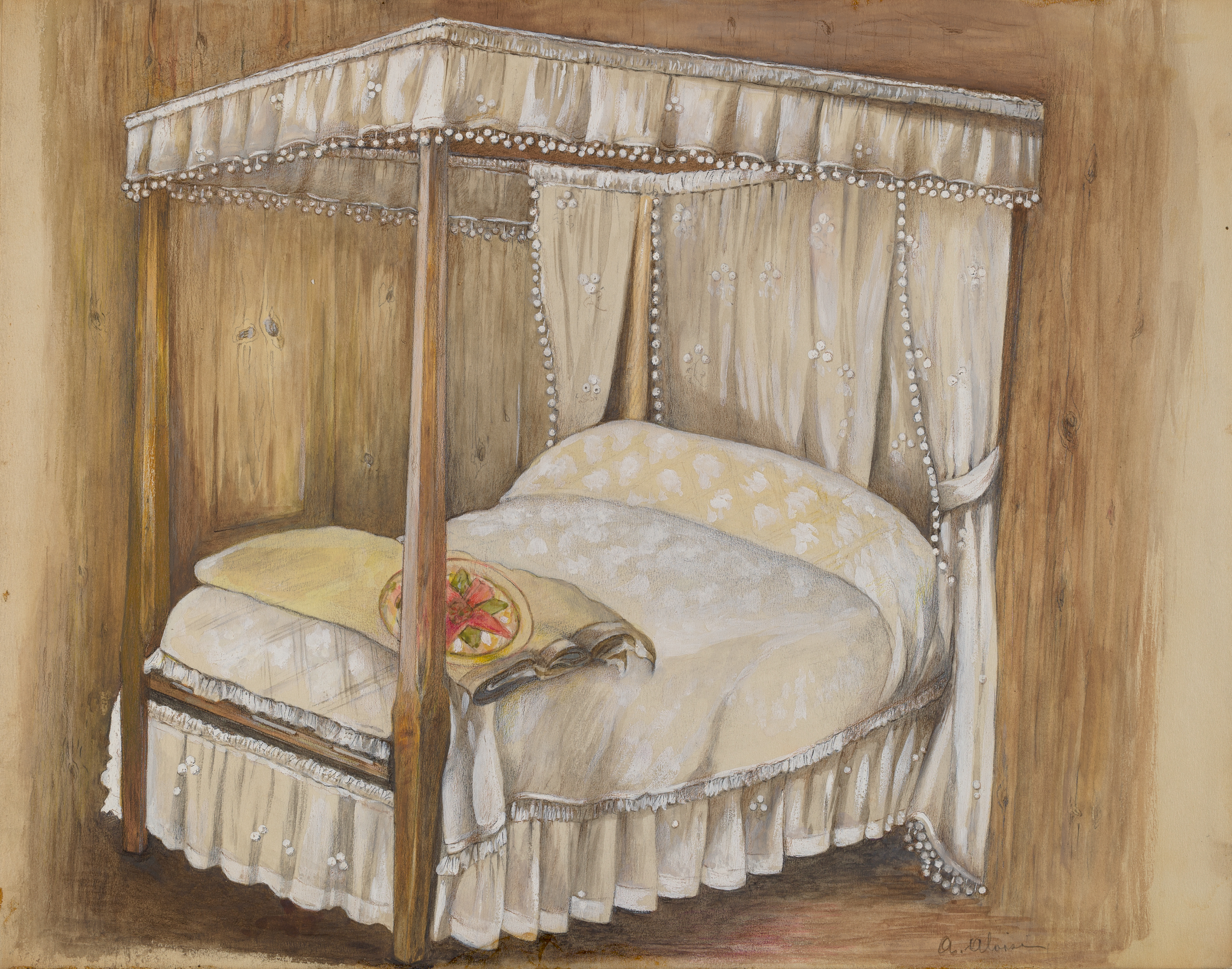
A 1936 artwork of a valanced double-bed

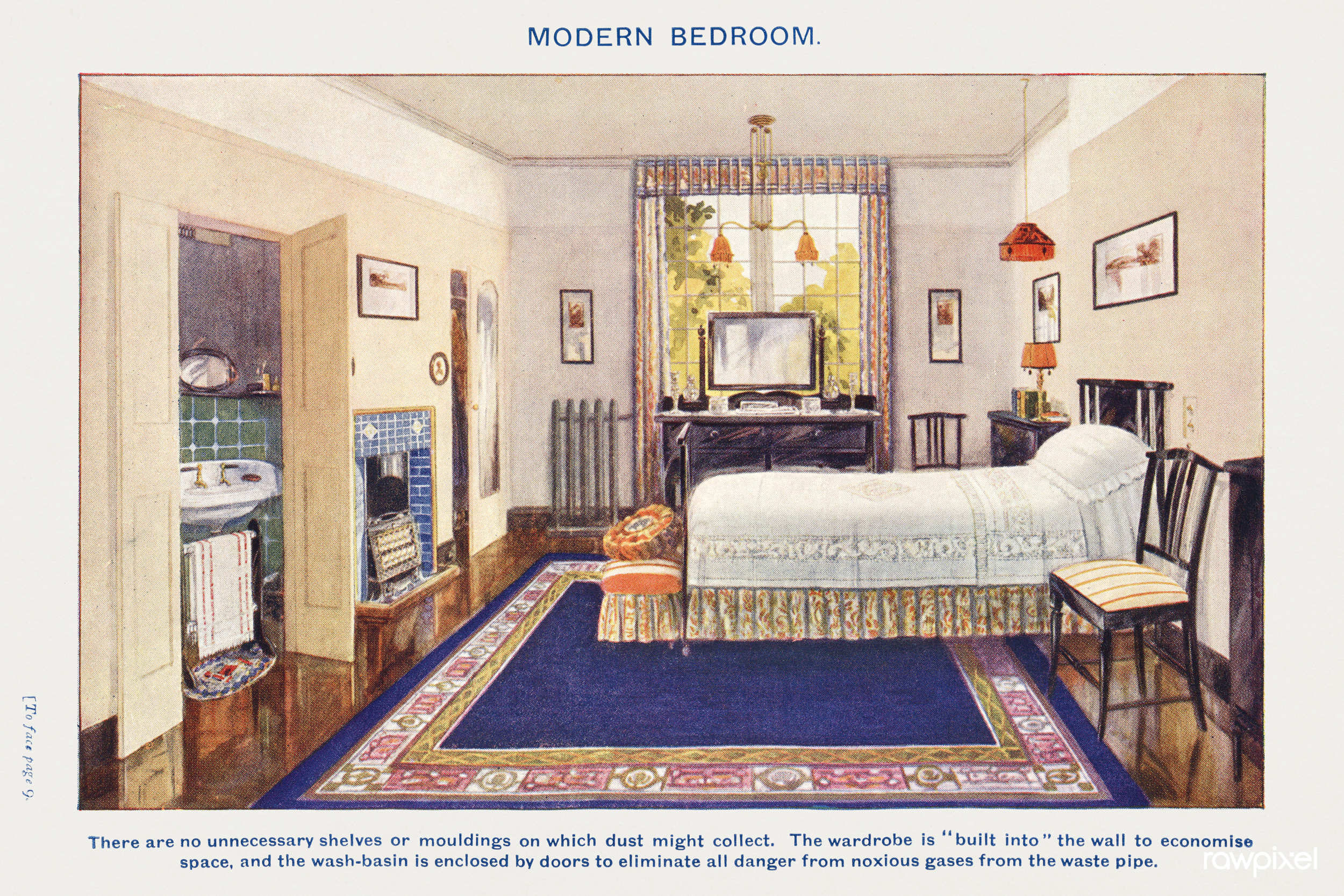
A painting featuring a bed with a valance, 1923.

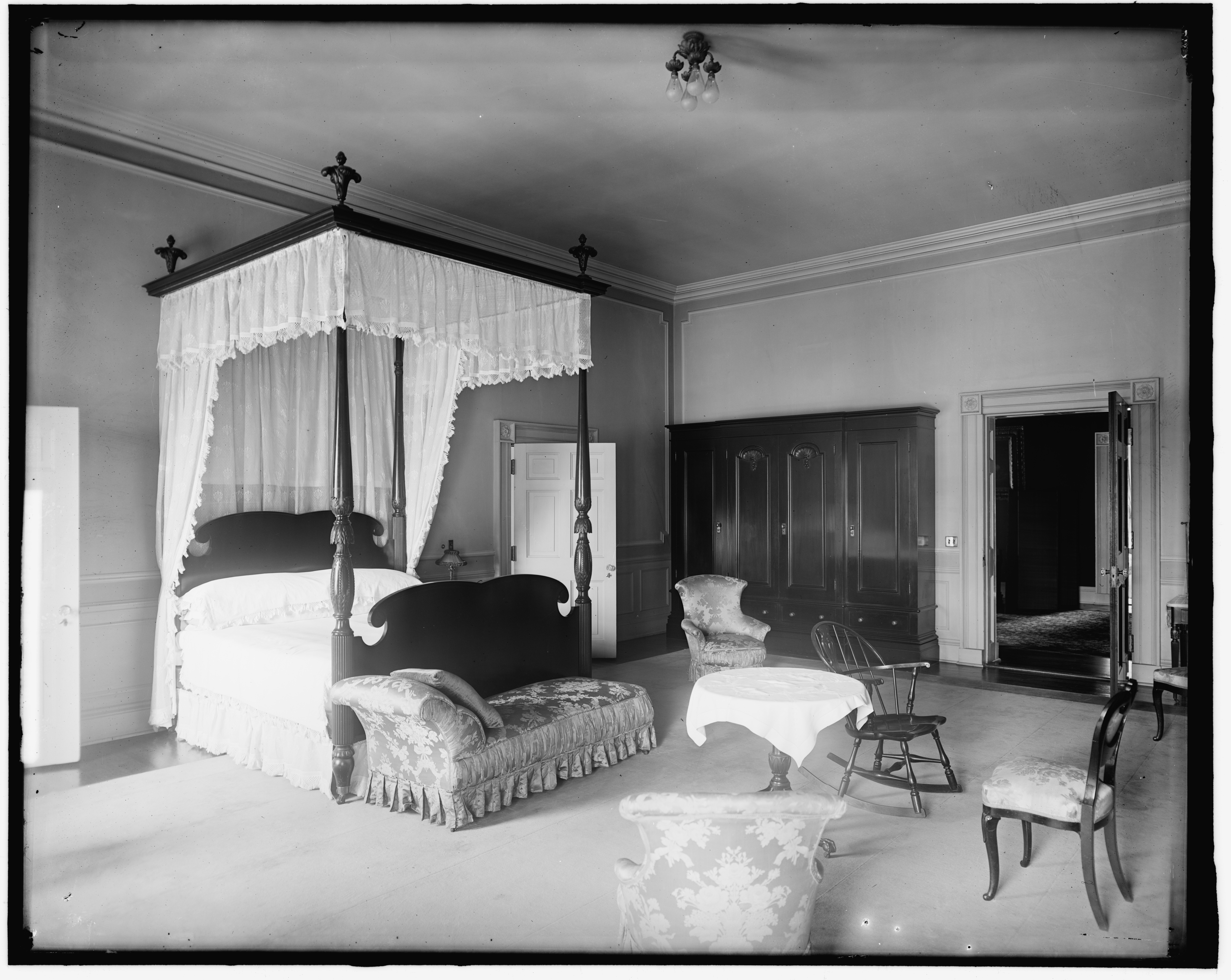
A bed with valance in the White House, Washington D.C., early 20th century

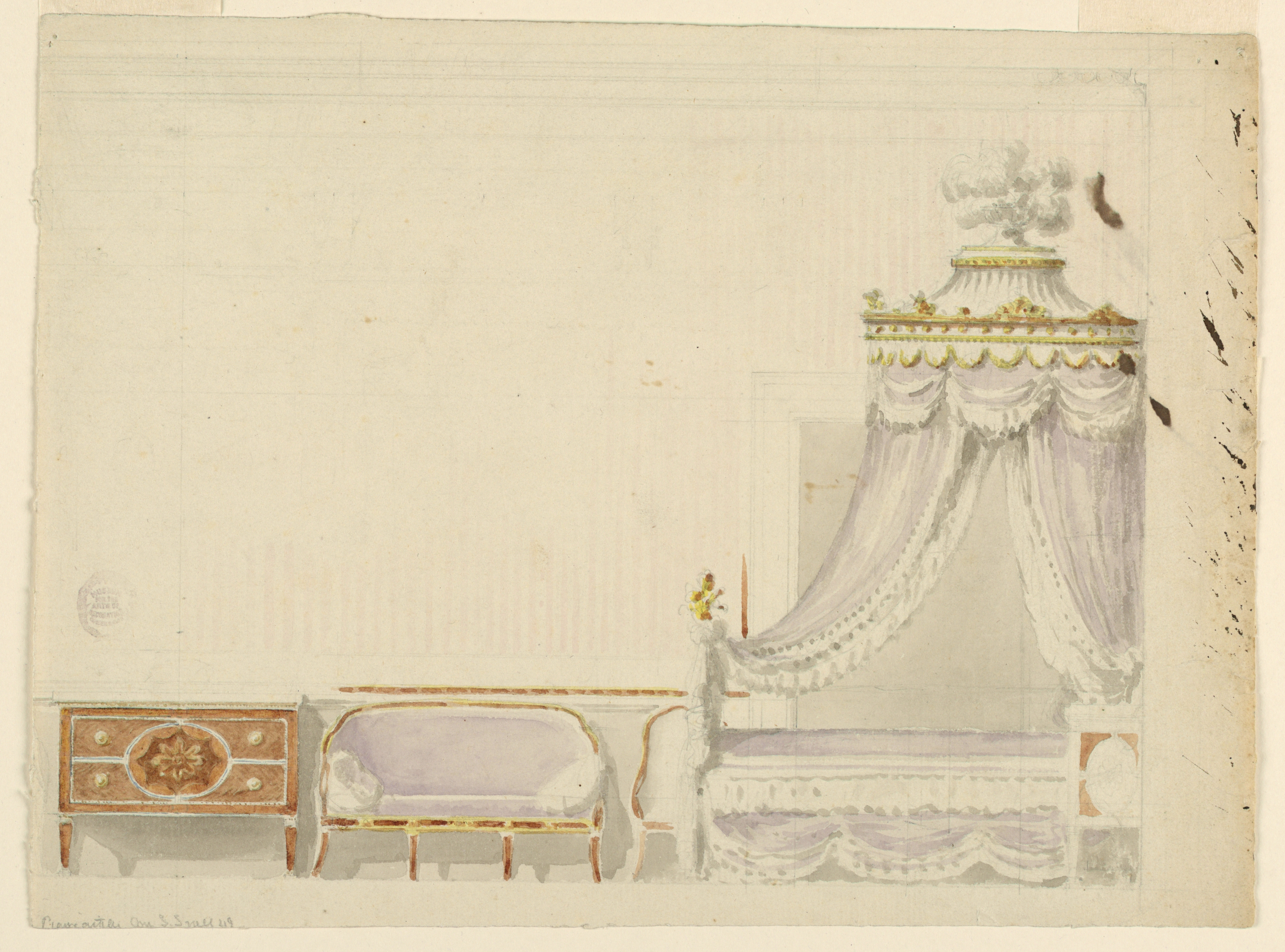
Late 18th century painting of a bed with a valance

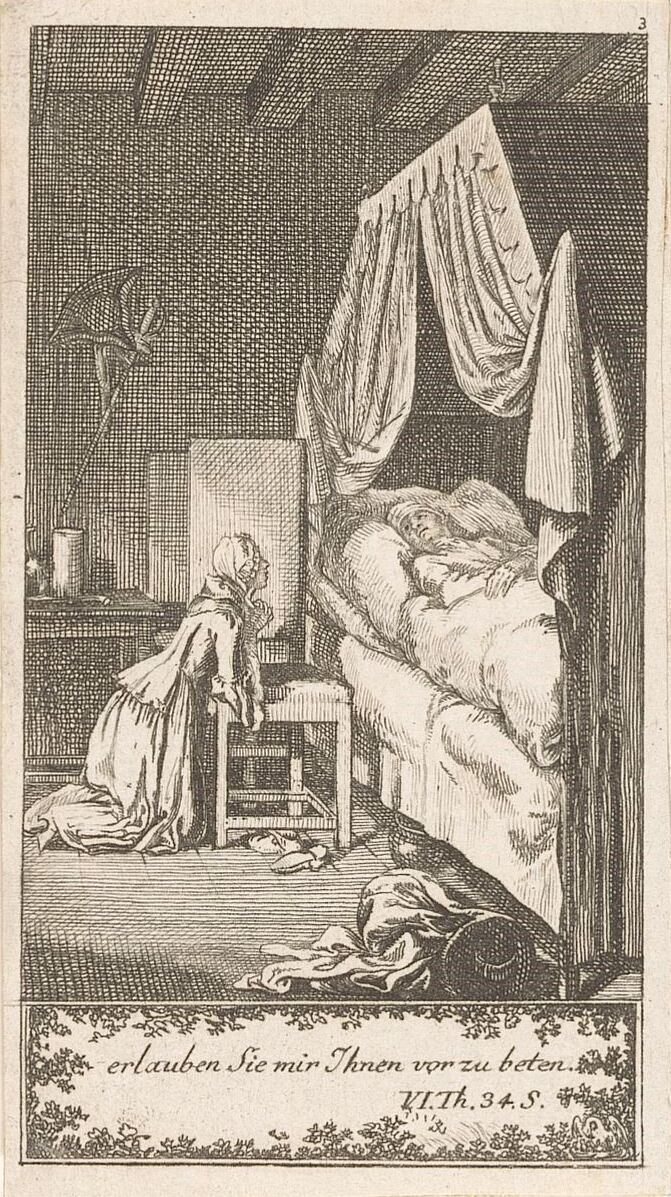
A 1776 Dutch artwork featuring a man on a valanced bed

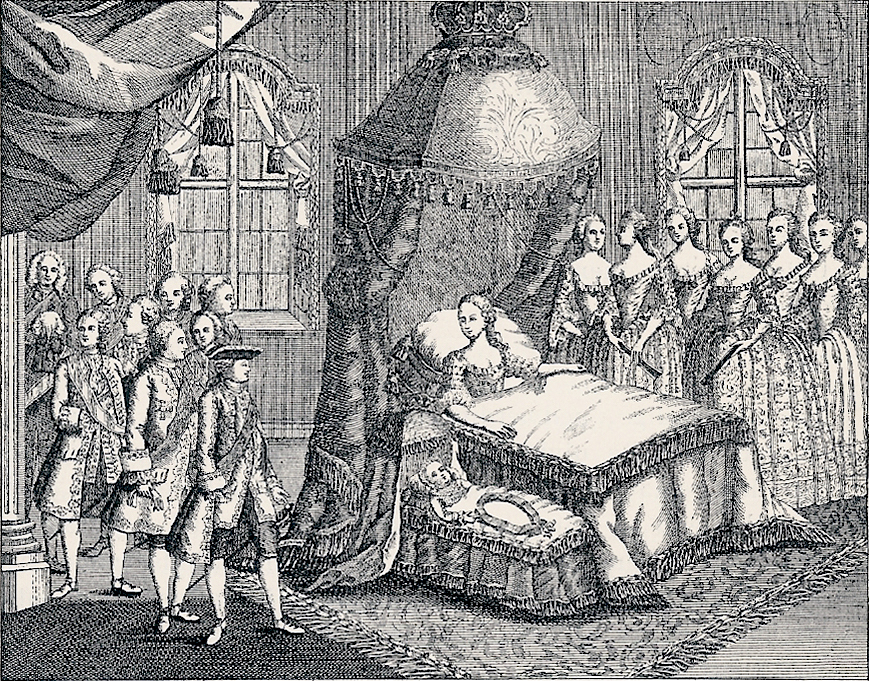
Birth of Frederick VI of Denmark; Frederick and his mother depicted on valanced bedding, 1768
