= Lit à la Turque =

Bed with two scrolling ends and a side baldachin

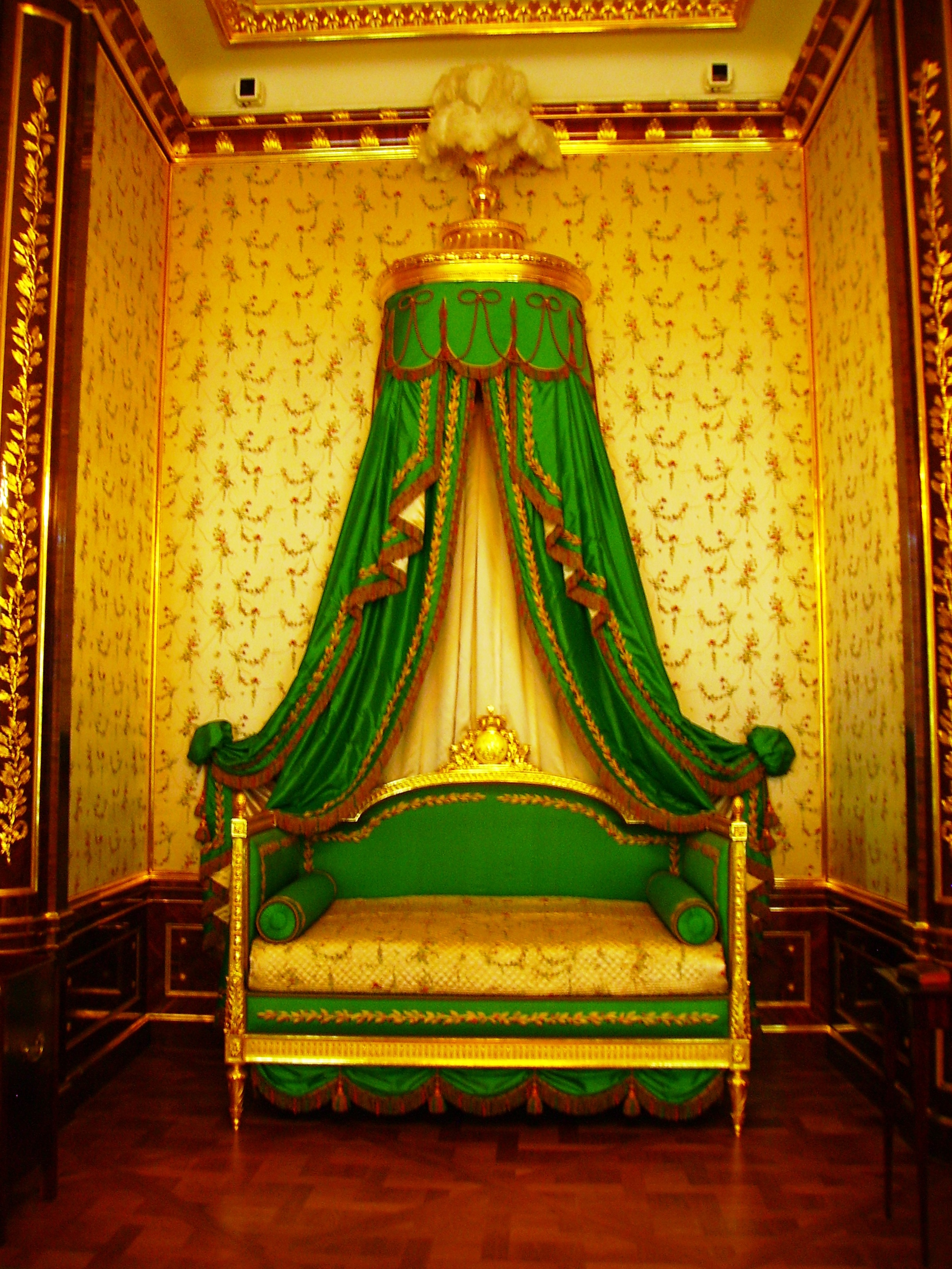
Reconstruction, Warsaw Royal Castle

The Lit à la Turque, a bed with two scrolling ends and a side baldachin, was one of many products of the 18th century. Due to the obsession with anything exotic or unusual from foreign countries, beds, furniture and other objects reflected this style. The design of this bed is not directly linked with any Turkish design, but reflects the luxurious and romantic designs that inspired the craftsmen of this time.

Beds of this type were placed sideways against the wall with a baldachin above either hung from the ceiling, or cantilevered from the wall or wall-side poles. Many times these beds were placed on wheels allowing the body of the bed to be pulled out and made up easily, while the back would stay attached to the wall. Others were self-contained, with the crown mounted on poles on one side only (both sides makes it a Polish bed).

Fashion for Turkish things peaked in the 18th century when Madame de Pompadour had a bedroom called the chambre à la turque (Turkish bedroom).

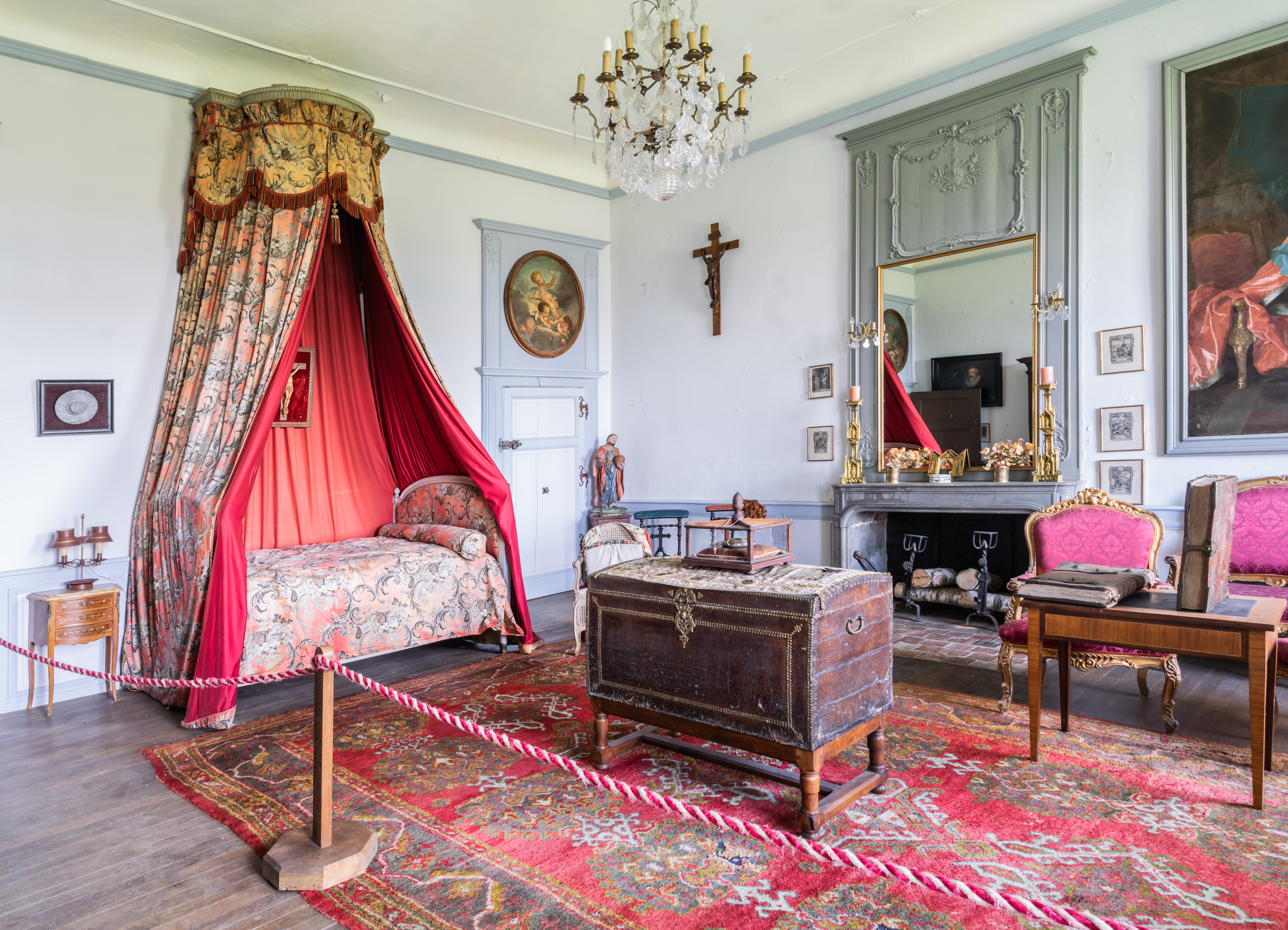
Canopy cantilevered from the wall

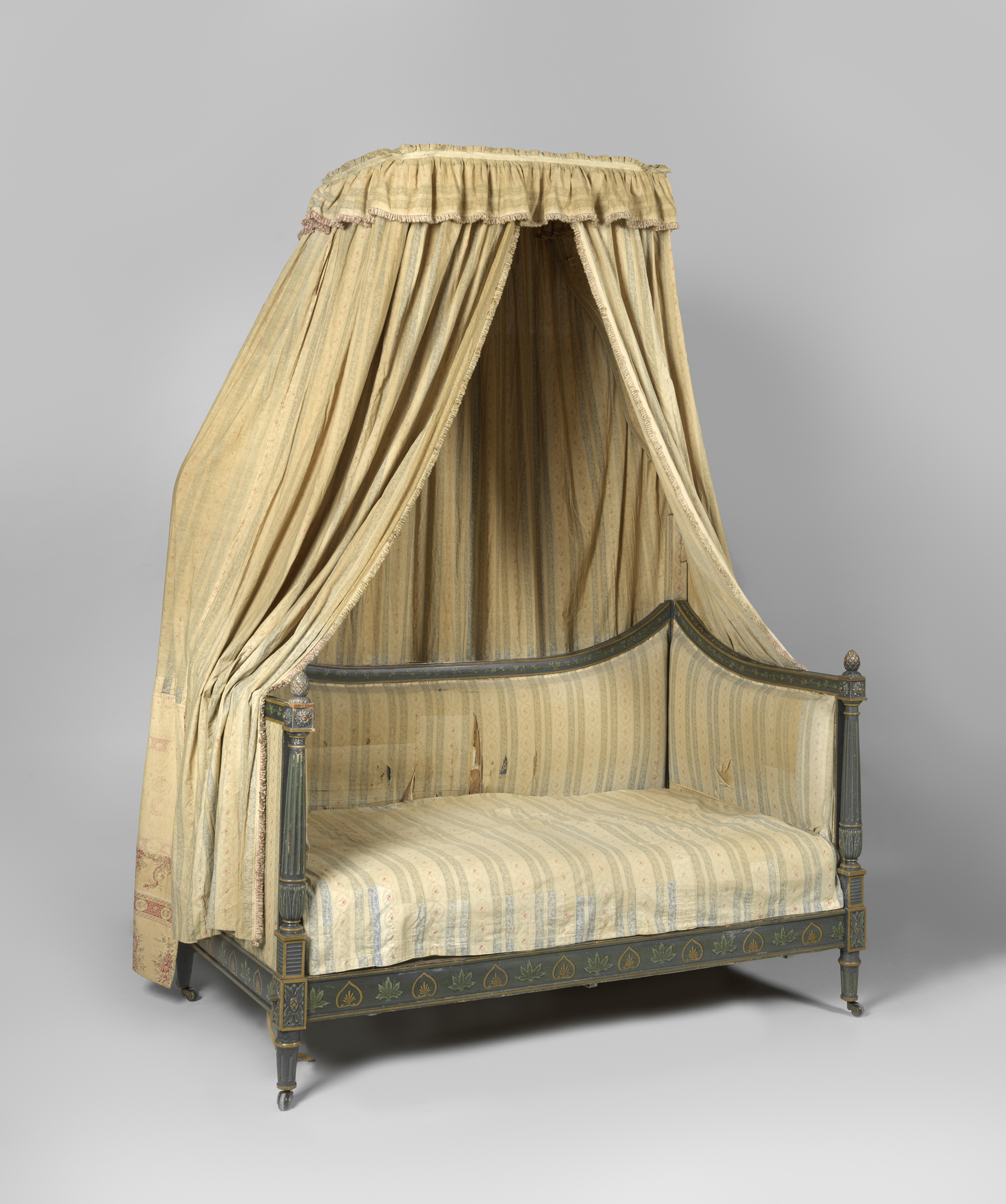
Crown supported by poles at the back to make a self-contained piece of furniture. Bolsters apparently missing.

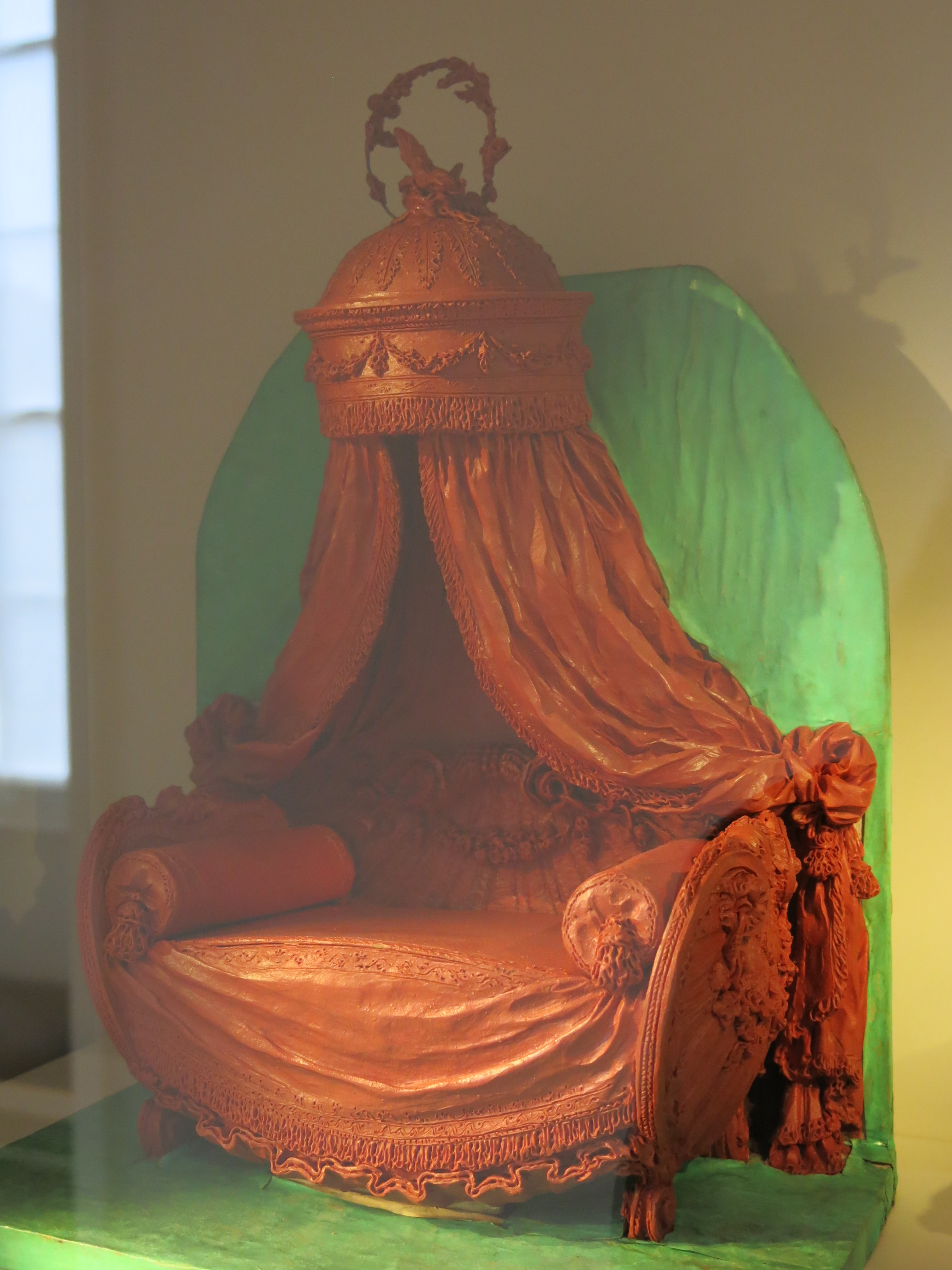
A wax design model

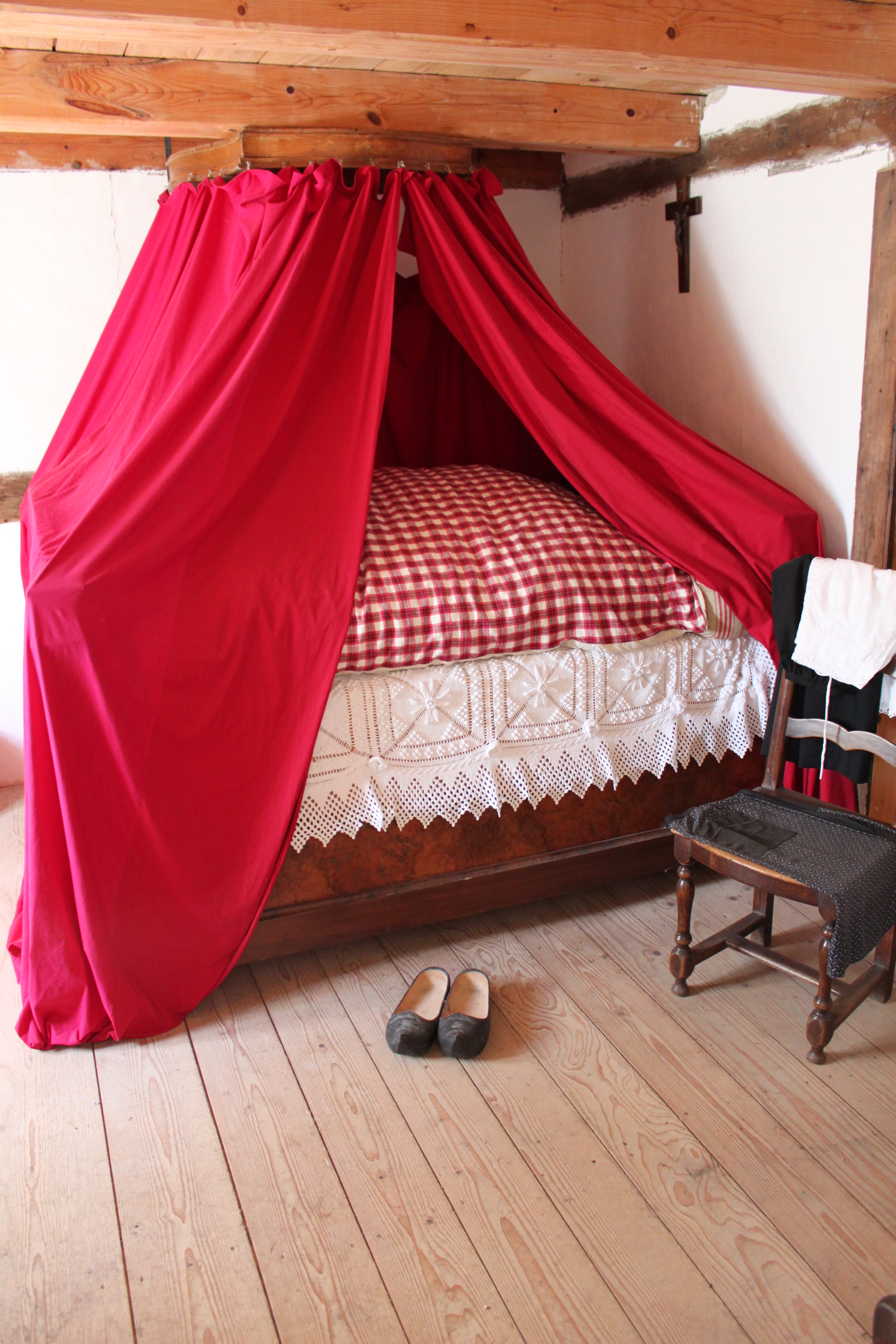
A simpler farmer's version, warm canopy apparently fasted to the ceiling-beams

== See also ==
- Canopy bed
- Polish bed
