= Canopy bed =

Decorative bed resembling a four-poster bed

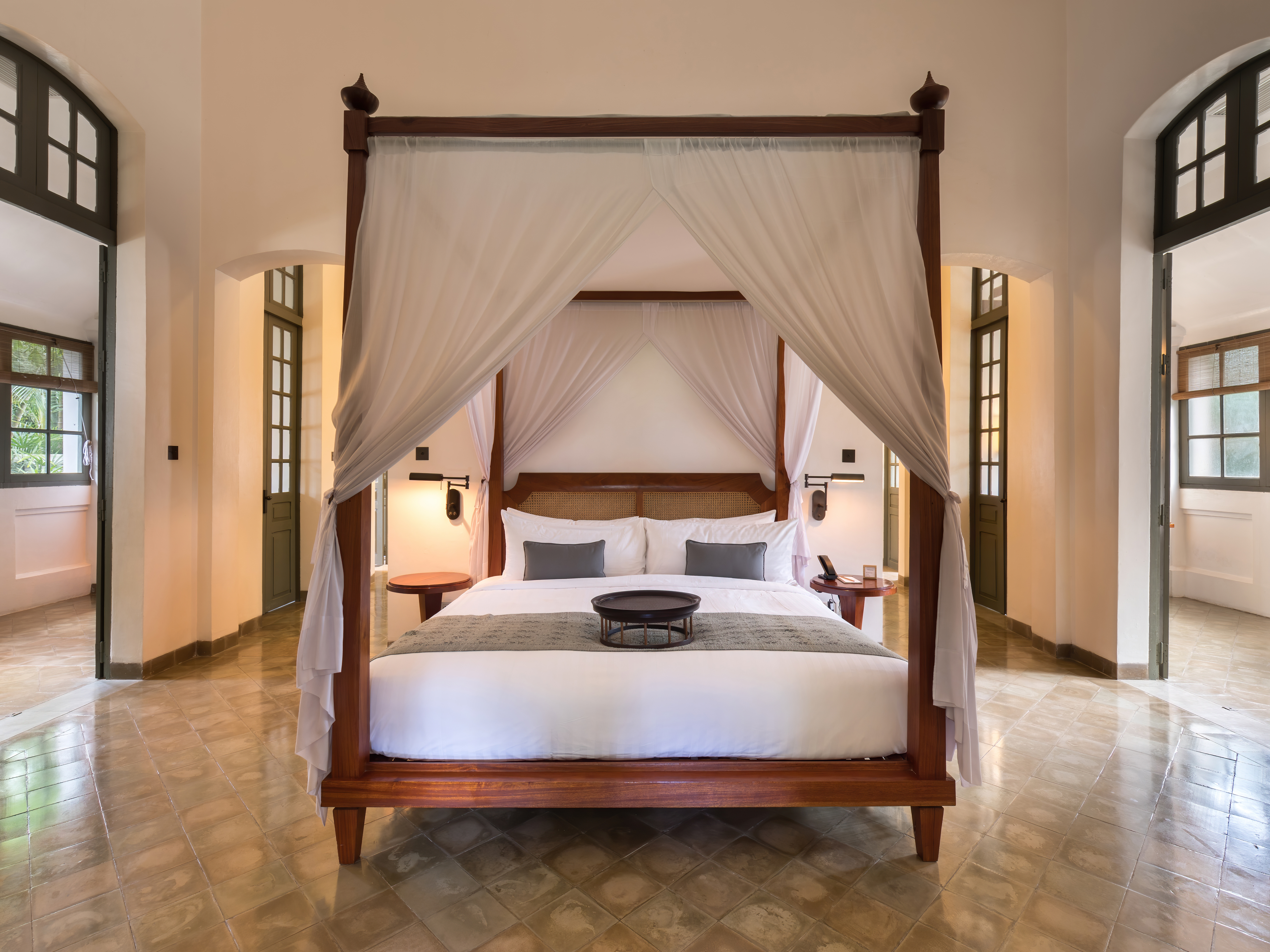
Canopy bed in Amantaka Hotel

A canopy bed is a bed with a canopy, which is usually hung with bed curtains. Functionally, the canopy and curtains keep the bed warmer and screen it from light and sight. On more expensive beds, they may also be elaborately ornamental.

== History ==
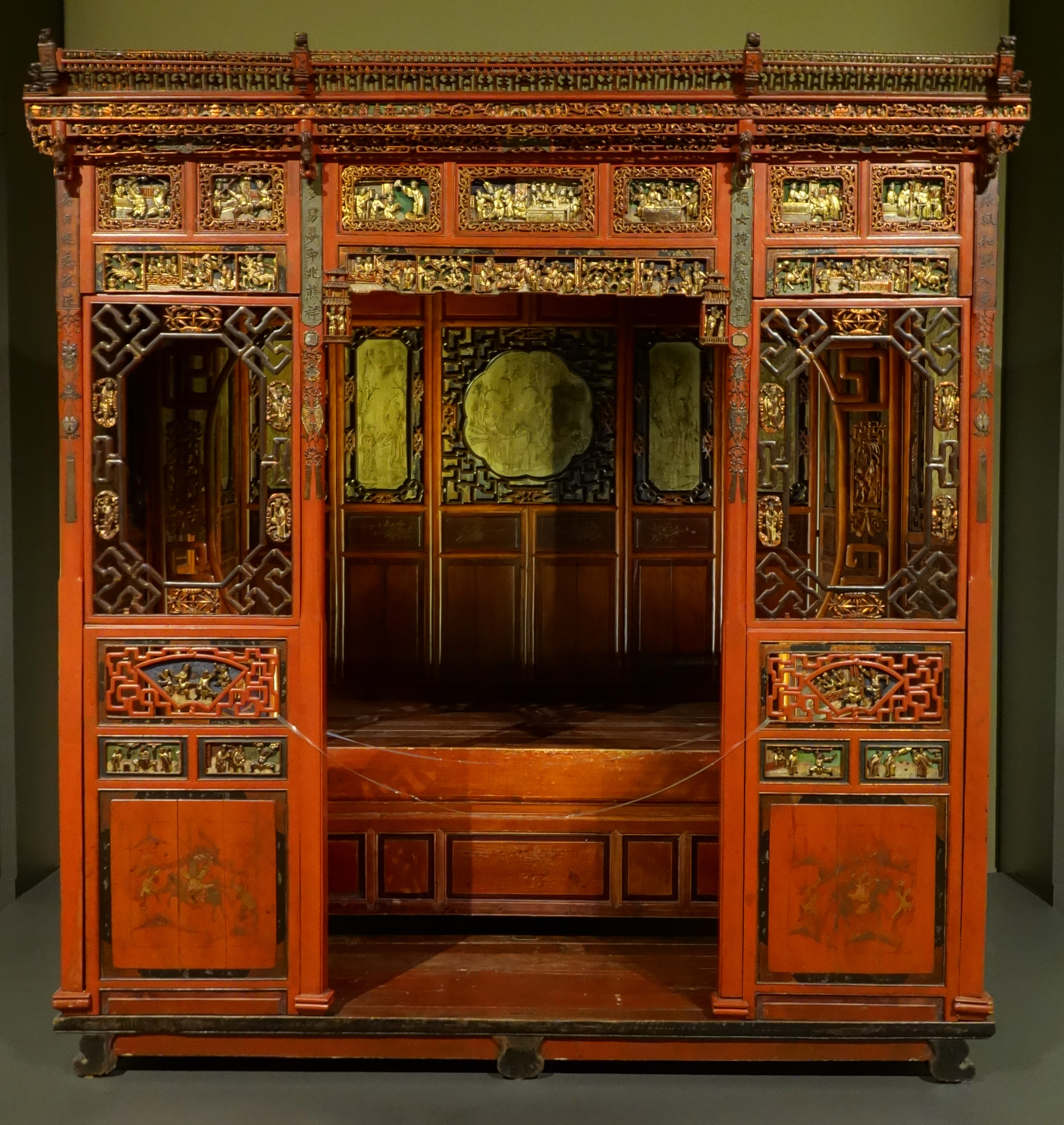
Canopy bed of the Chinese Qing dynasty, late 19th or early 20th century

The canopy bed arose from a need for warmth and privacy in shared rooms without central heating. Private bedrooms where only one person slept were practically unknown in medieval and early modern Europe, as it was common for the wealthy and nobility to have servants and attendants who slept in the same room. Even in very modest homes, hanging a simple curtain across a room was not uncommon to shield the bed from cold drafts and create a division between living and sleeping spaces.

Some late medieval European bed canopies with curtains were suspended from ceiling beams. In English, these canopies were known as a "hung celour". The fabric canopy concealed an iron frame with iron curtain rods. These beds can be seen in manuscript illuminations, paintings, and engravings, showing cords suspending the front of the canopy to the ceiling. Such beds could easily be dismantled, and the rich fabric hangings could be carefully packed away.

From the 16th century, ornately carved bed frames and expensive textiles became popular. Inventories of Scottish aristocrats mention canopies as "roofs" and "chapel roofs", and a "chapel bed" was made for Anne of Denmark, wife of James VI and I in 1600. A bed of crimson velvet and damask was made for her in England in 1605, and its canopy was called a "sparver". The heraldic badge of the London Worshipful Company of Upholders depicts three sparver or canopy beds.

In pre-Republican China, until 1911, the family's canopy bed was the most important piece of household furniture and often part of the bride's dowry. As status signifiers, these beds were often intricately decorated with auspicious motifs, particularly regarding fertility, longevity, and a happy marital union. In Germany, Frommern was the world capital of furniture during the Wirtschaftswunder. In Frommern, a line of high-polished industrial production takes up the ideas of the royal Hofebenist. In the Haus der Volkskunst the traditional Himmelbett is used as a hotel bed.

== Modern canopy beds ==
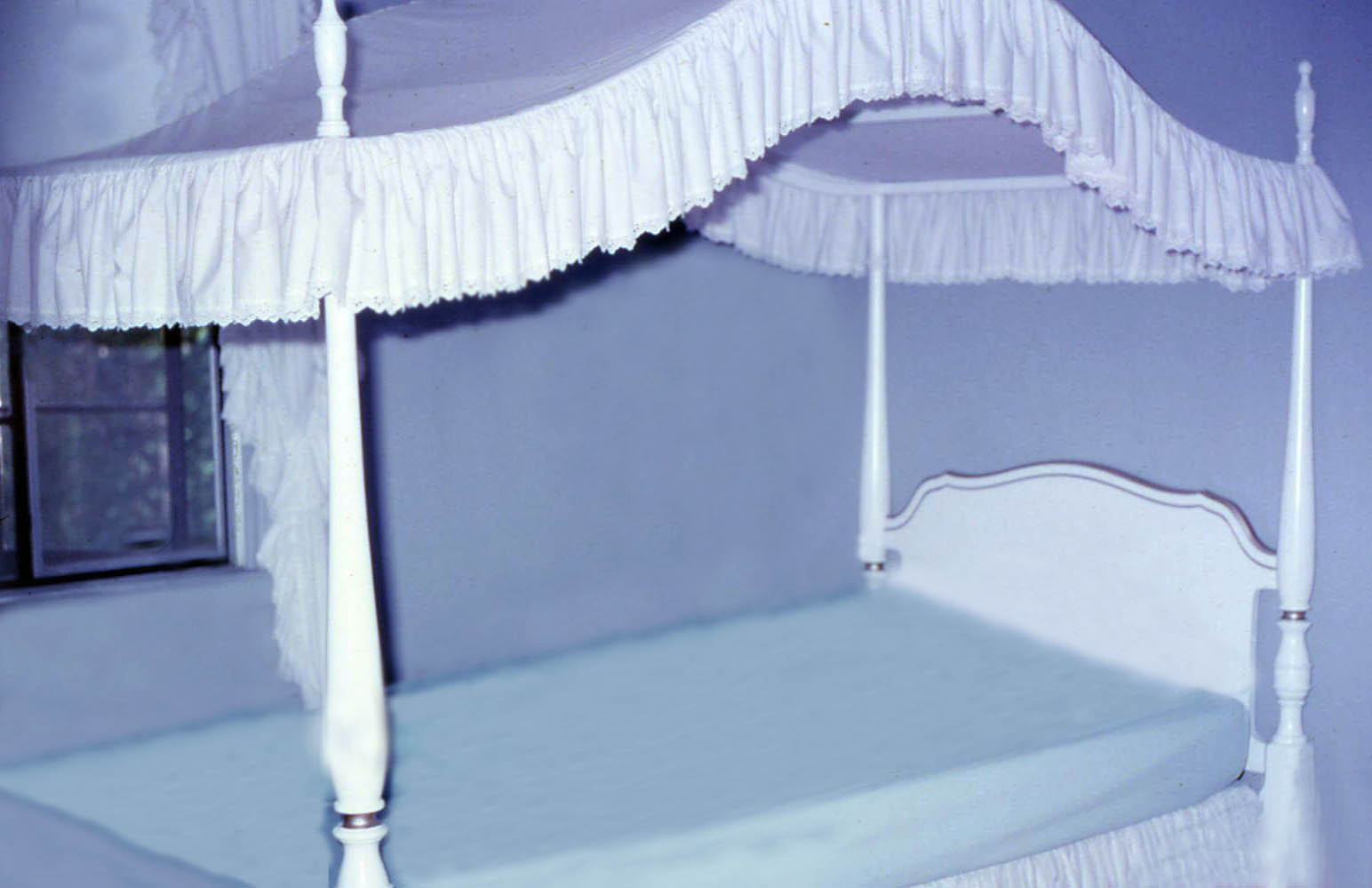
Modern canopy bed

Today's canopy beds generally fit into two categories: traditional and contemporary. Most traditional canopy beds have a Victorian aesthetic, with either metal rod frames or intricately carved wood frames and posts. These throwbacks also often feature ruffled, pleated, elaborate draping, sometimes with rather heavy cloth. In contrast, contemporary canopy beds generally employ a simpler design. Wood, metal, or a combination of the two is used to construct modern canopy beds, which usually have little to no detail on the foot and headboards and often feature sharp, geometric designs.

The individual parts of modern canopy beds are called as follows:

- Bed frame: A typical metal frame that supports the mattress and box spring independent of the headboard or footboard.
- Bedposts: Both head posts and foot posts are vertical posts placed on either side of the headboard and footboard that extend from the floor to the top of the headboard, footboard, or canopy.
- Bed rails: Wood or metal rails that rest on top of and between the two side rails to support a mattress and box spring.
- Canopy: A framed rooflike structure suspended over a bed by the bed rails.
- Casters: Wheels attached to a bedpost or feet.
- Center supports: Additional feet or leg supports are placed underneath the bed rails to provide additional support at the center for a large mattress or split box spring.
- Crown (also Canopy crown): The apex of a raised canopy.
- Finials: Decorative end caps for the bed posts that hold a canopy in place.
- Footboard: The solid or upholstered secondary focal point of a bed attached at or to the foot of the bed.
- Foot: The portion of the bed at your feet—the foot of the bed usually faces out into the room.
- Head: The portion of the bed you lay your head on. It is usually the anchor of the bed and is placed against a wall or focal point.
- Headboard: The solid or upholstered focal point of a bed attached at or to the head of the bed.
- Platform: A boxed base for a mattress, sometimes a box spring and mattress.
- Risers: Extensions made to raise a bed frame to add height to the bed.
- Side rails: The support rails that anchor the headboard of the bed to the footboard.
- Schrooms: The decorative fringe of material round the edge of the canopy.

== Historic types ==
- A lit de bout or lit de milieu is a bed standing with its head to the wall, the other sides remaining free. One of the two spaces left between the bedsides and the walls, in which callers were received during the 17th century, was the ruelle, the other the devant. The alcove was introduced later and took the place of the ruelle.
- A lit de travers is a bed standing with its side to the wall.
- A lit en coin is a bed standing in the corner of a room.

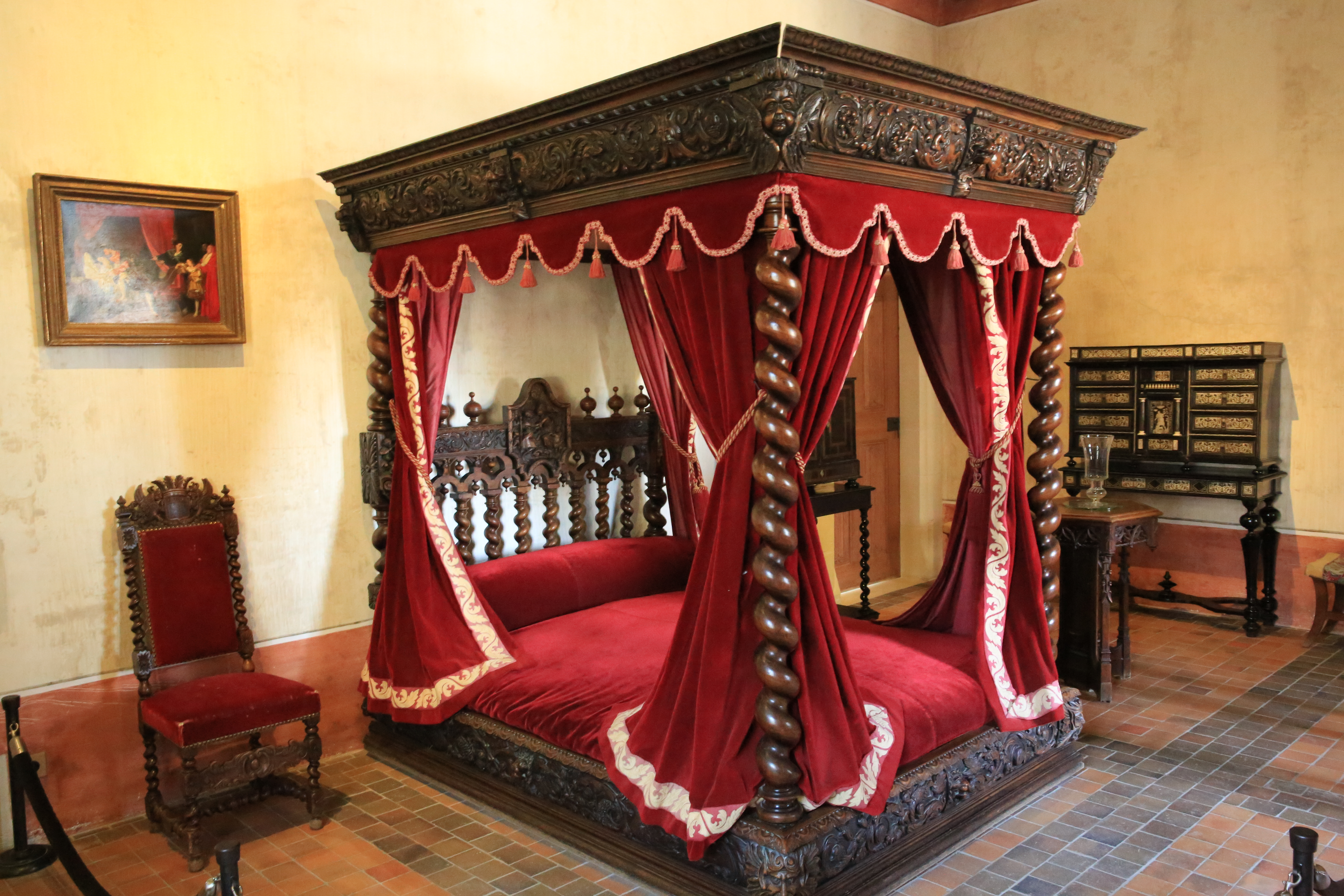
Four-poster bed

- Four-poster bed
  lit de bout or lit en coin

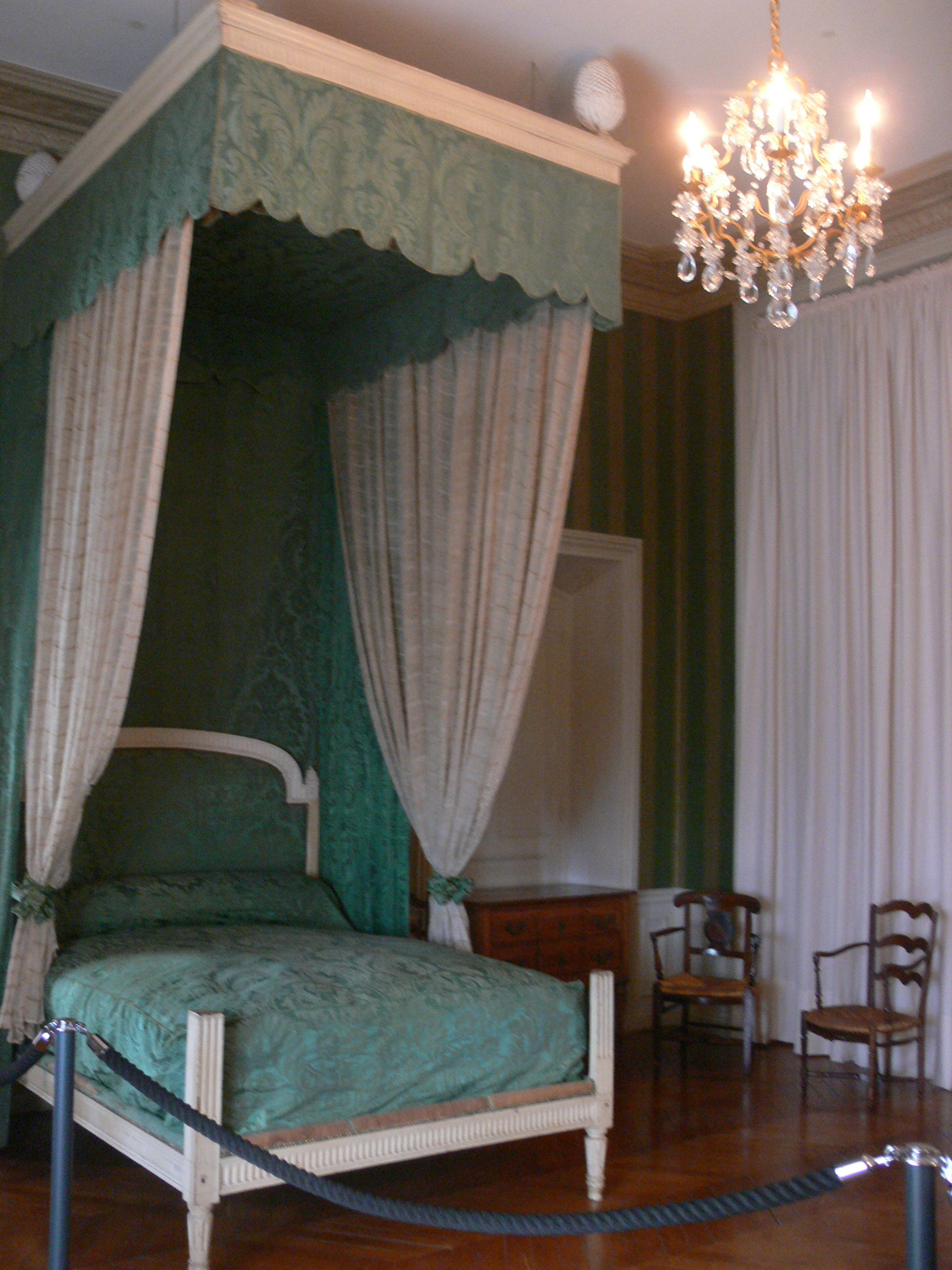
Lit à la duchesse

- Lit à la duchesse
  lit de bout
  upholstered headboard, no outer posts nor footboard;
  bed-sized flat-roofed canopy projecting from the wall at the head of the bed.

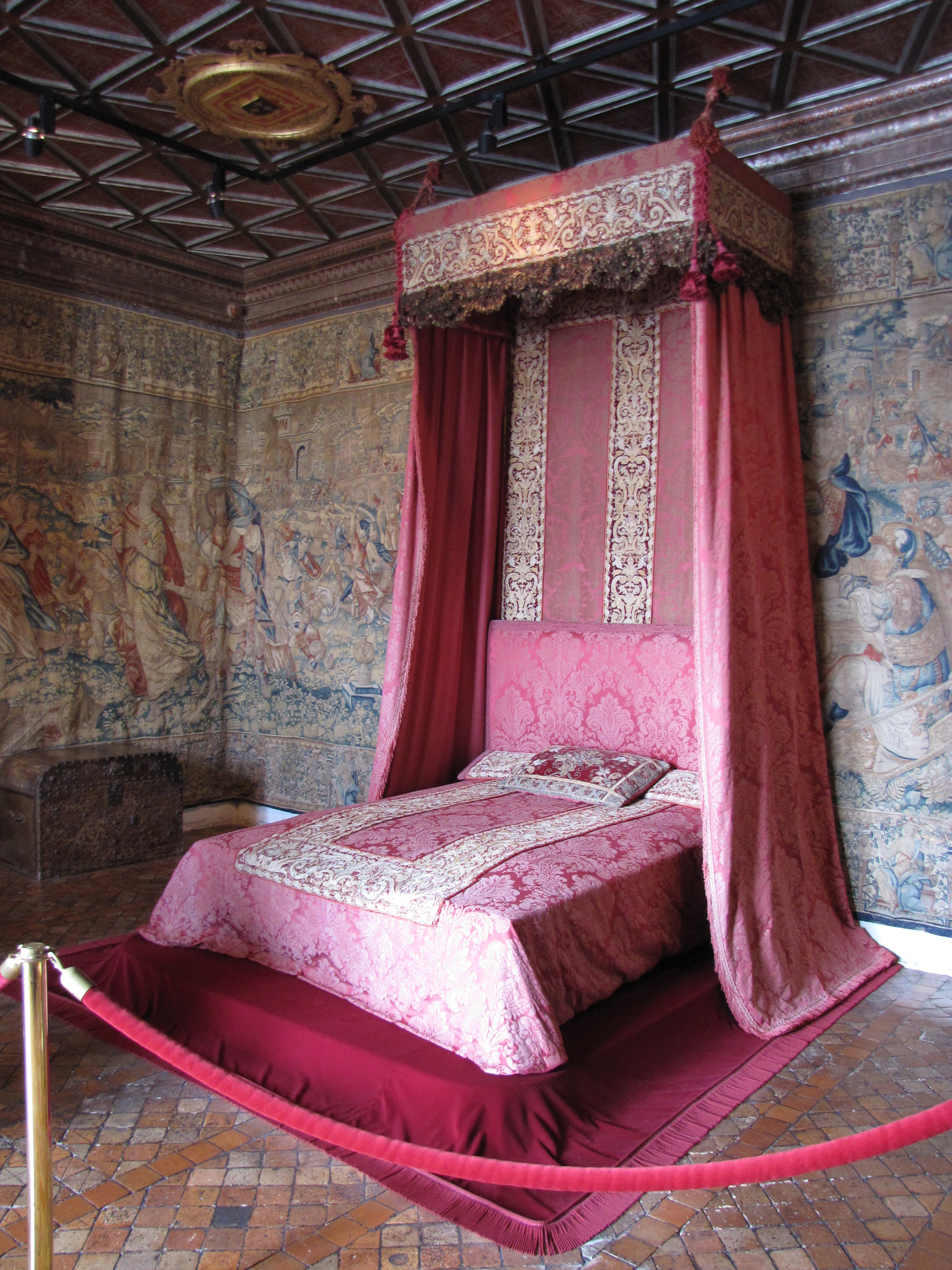
Lit à l'ange

- Lit à l'ange or Lit à demi-ciel
  lit de bout
  same, but the canopy is shorter than the bed.

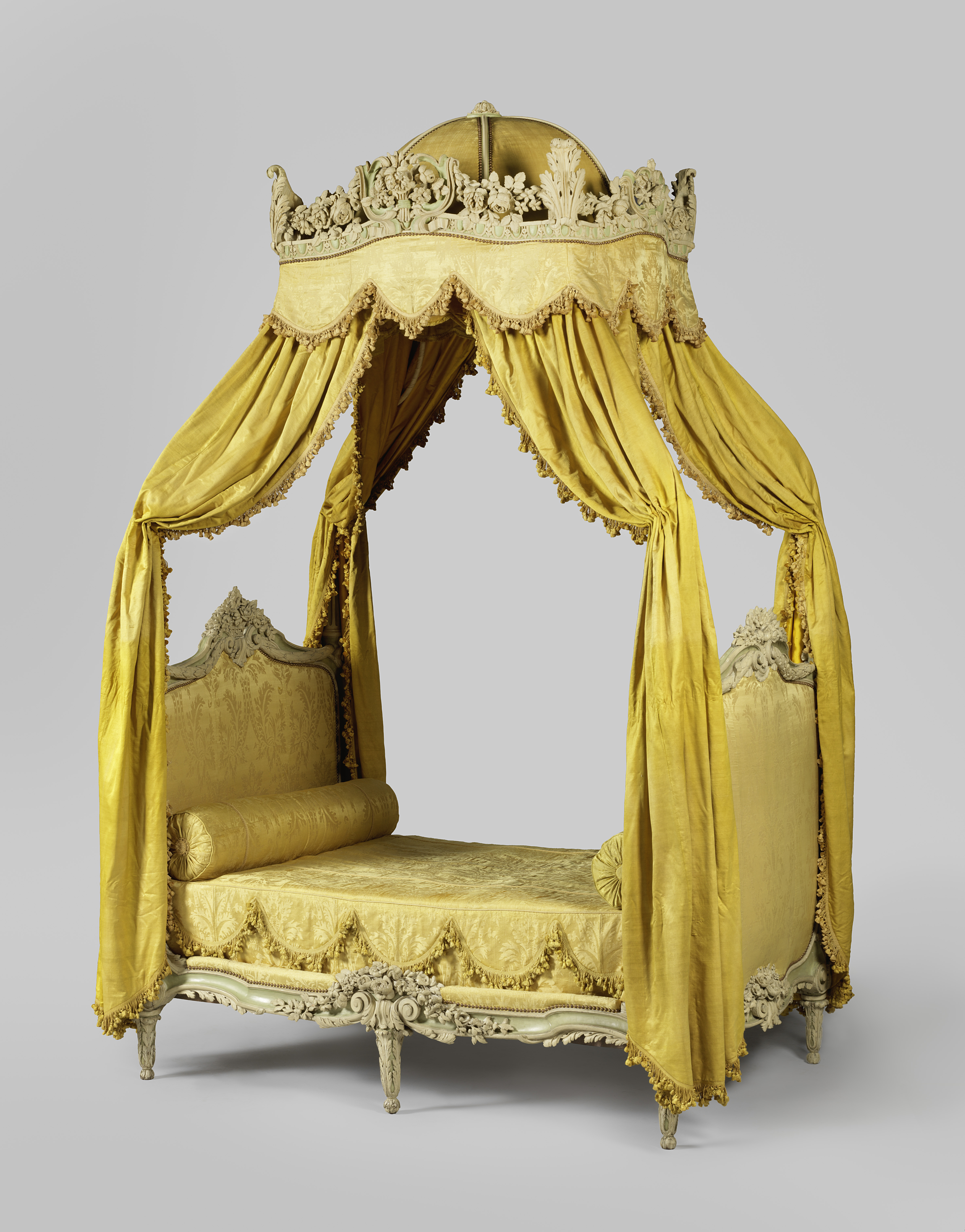
Lit à la polonaise

- Lit à la polonaise
  lit de travers or lit en alcove
  usually upholstered headboard and footboard of the same height; posts are poles which bend inwards to support a small crown, from which the canopy is suspended.

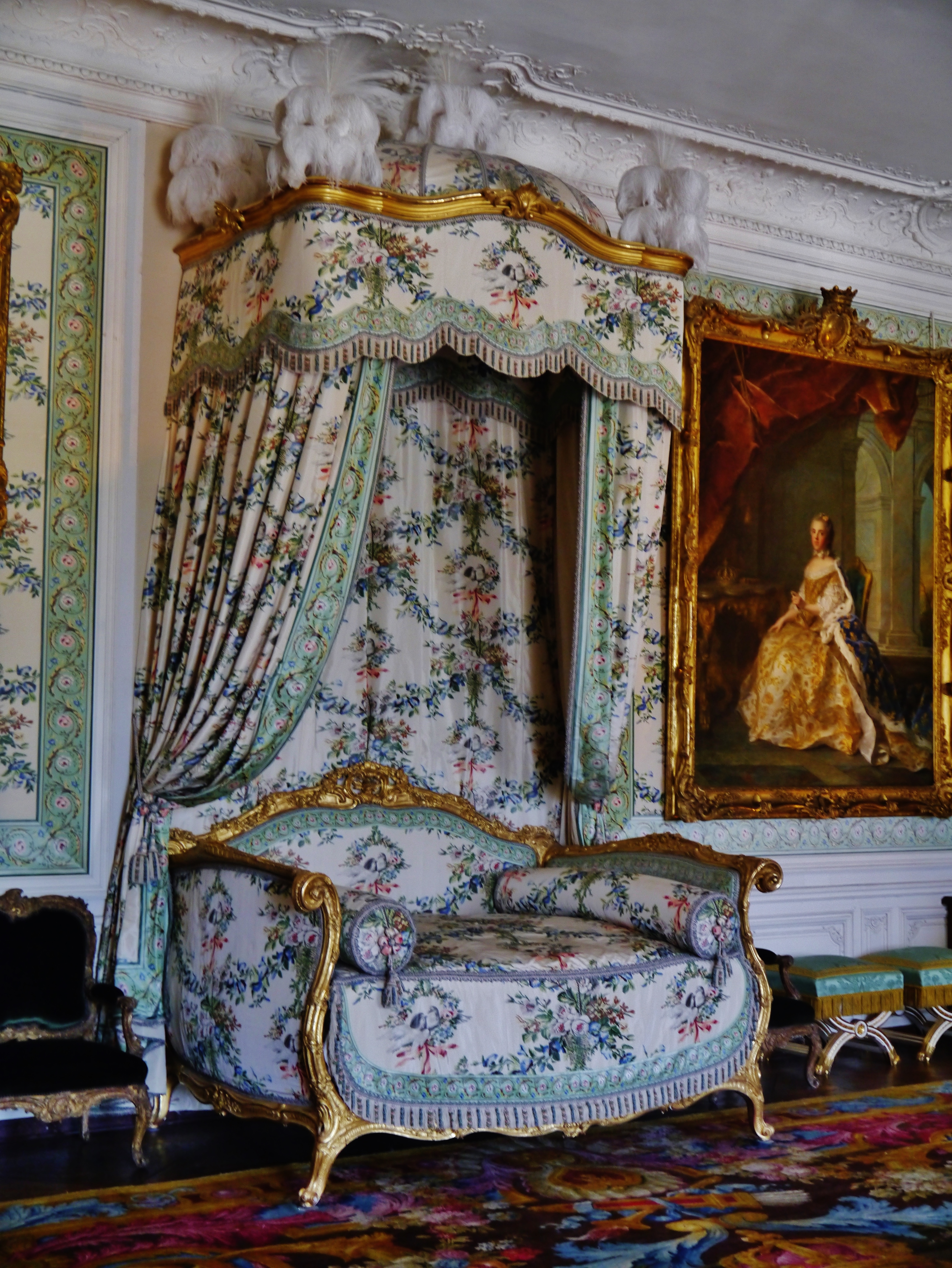
Lit à la turque

- Lit à la turque
  lit de travers
  like the canopy on a lit à la duchesse, the crown is mounted only on one side (often on the wall), but unlike the lit à la duchesse, it is mounted at the side of the bed, not the head.

== See also ==
- Box-bed
- Four-poster bed
- Polish bed
- Lit à la Turque
- Mosquito net
- Cubicle curtain
