= Polish bed =

Type of canopy bed

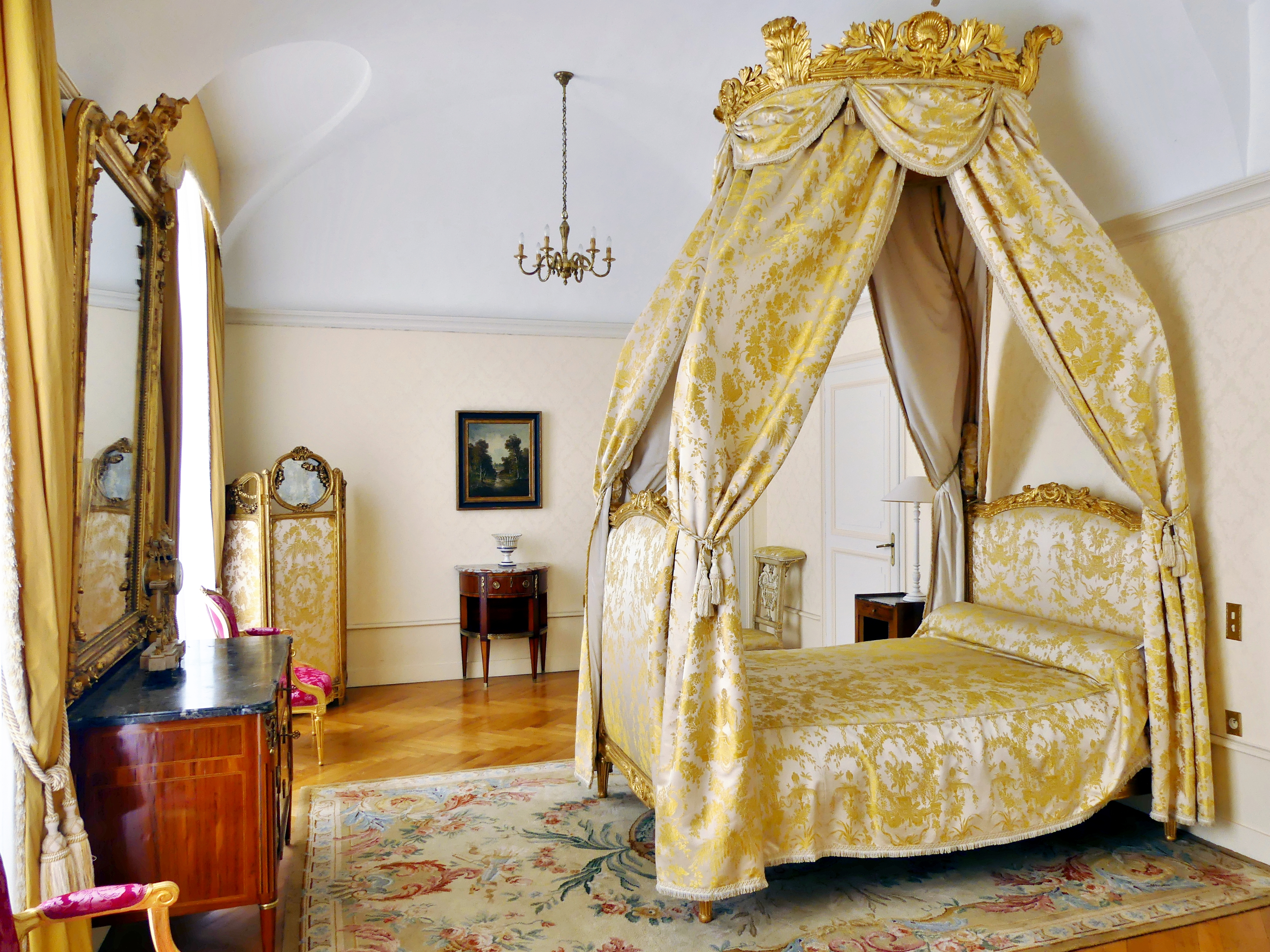
A historical 18th-century Polish bed (lit à la polonaise) at Chambéry, France

A Polish bed (French: Lit à la polonaise; French: [pɔlɔnɛz]), alternatively known in English as a polonaise, is a type of small-canopy bed which most likely originated in Poland and became a centrepiece of 18th-century French furniture. The curtain is topped with an elaborate crownlike centrepiece, which is connected to the four vertical corner poles of the bed frame (which are usually curved). Unlike the four-poster bed, the canopy is much smaller than the bed.

Historically, a Polish bed was often placed on its side against the wall to serve as a daybed. Nowadays, any type of curtained daybed or couch is known under this term. The Polish bed shares many similarities with the lit à la turque, however Turkish-styled beds contain two scrolling ends and the canopy is generally off-center, and suspended from one side only.

They were popularized in France by Polish-born queen Marie Leszczyńska, who married Louis XV in 1725. Hence, it became a principal piece of the so-called Louis XV furniture. These richly decorated rococo beds were generally designated for the wealthier upper classes and aristocracy that resided in palaces, however, canopies were also popular in many common homes (the warmth of the curtains was functional). The French propagated the design as lit à la polonaise.

Polish beds dating back to the period can be found in museums, most famous being the Palace of Versailles in France. The polonaise should not be confused with the lit à la Duchesse where the canopy is only supported from one end.

== Gallery ==
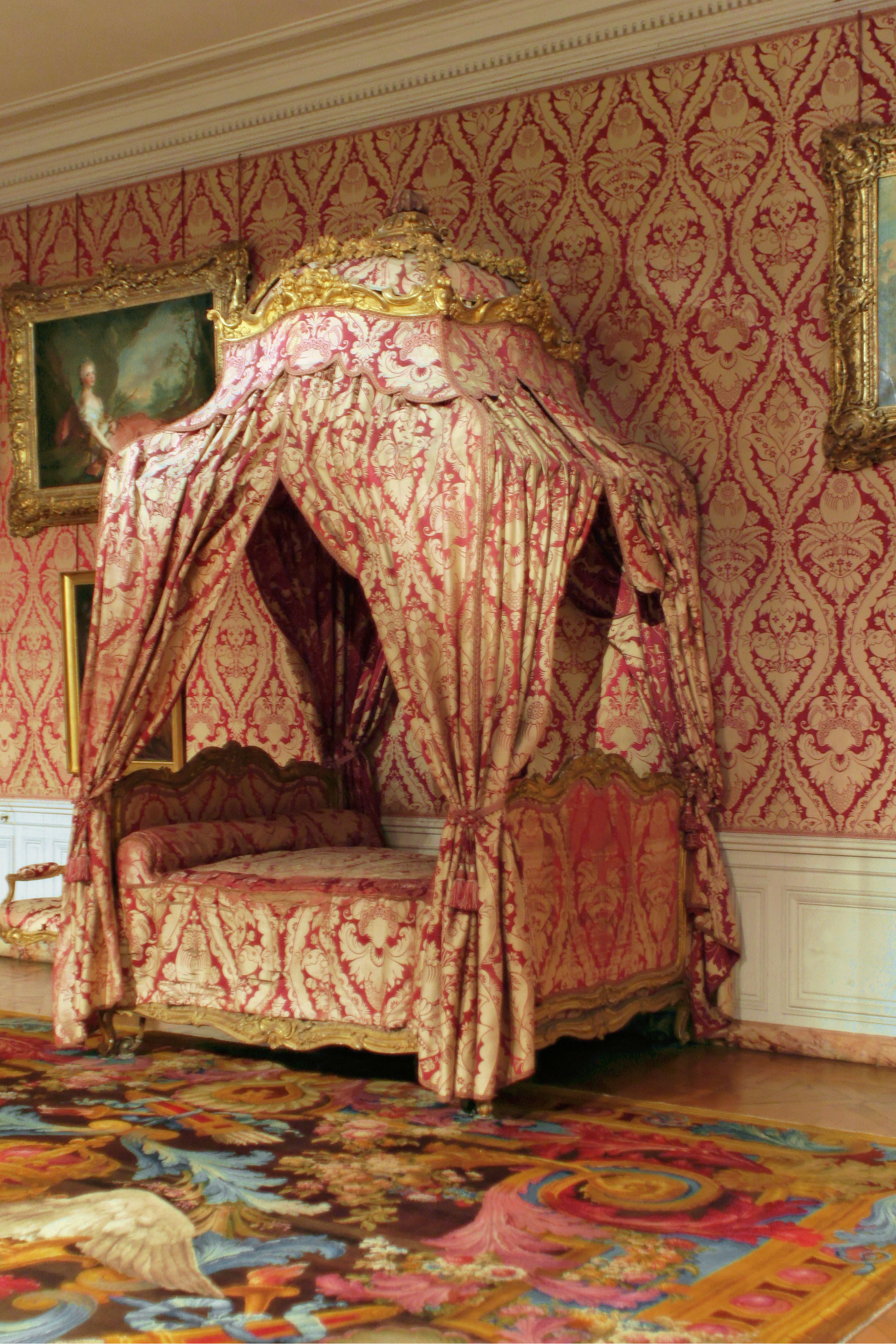
A Polish bed in one of the royal chambers at Versailles

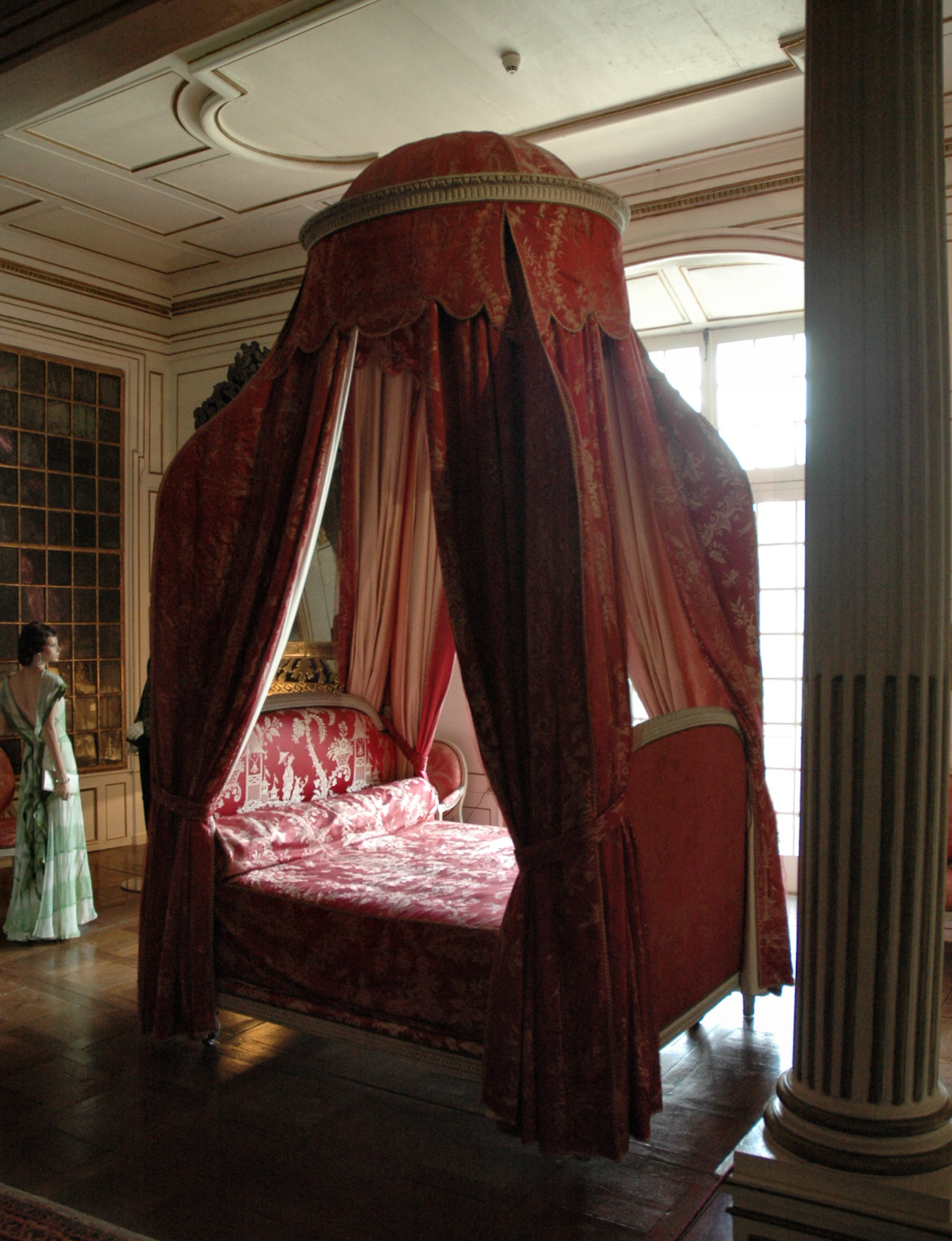
King's bed, Château d'Ussé

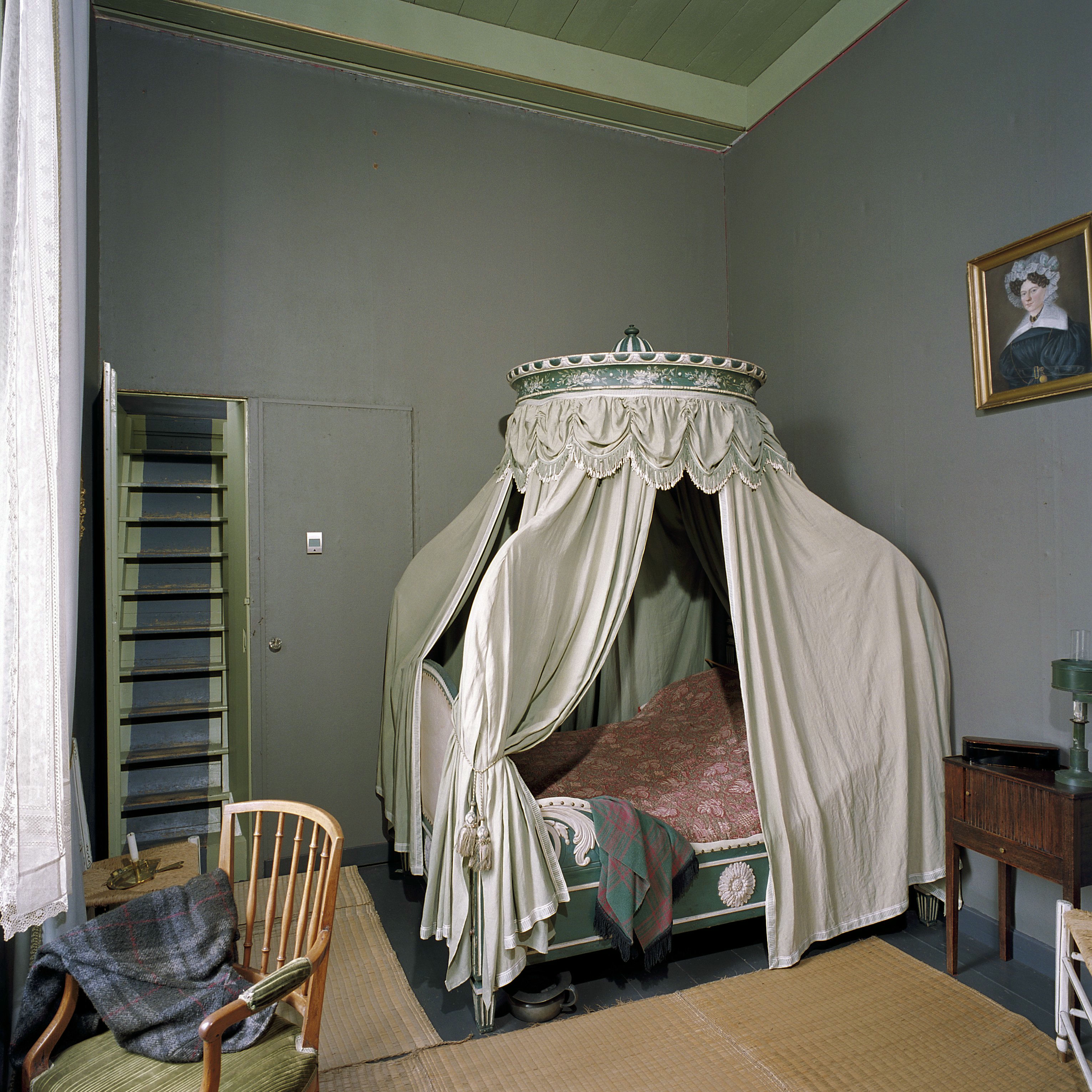
Simpler Dutch version

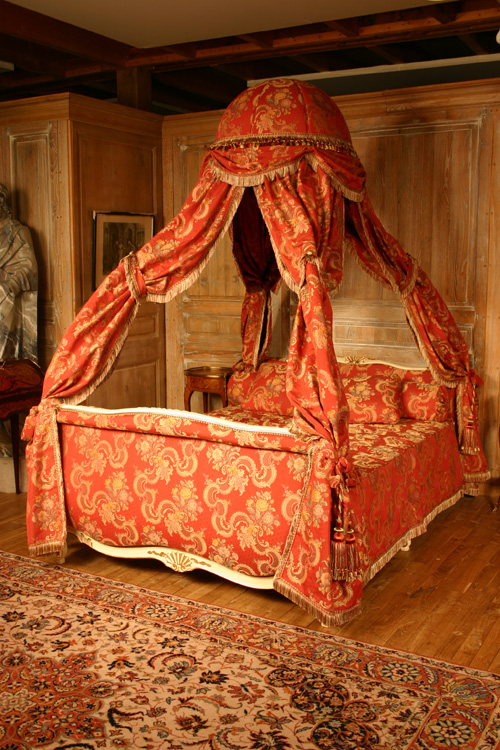
Louis XV style, replica

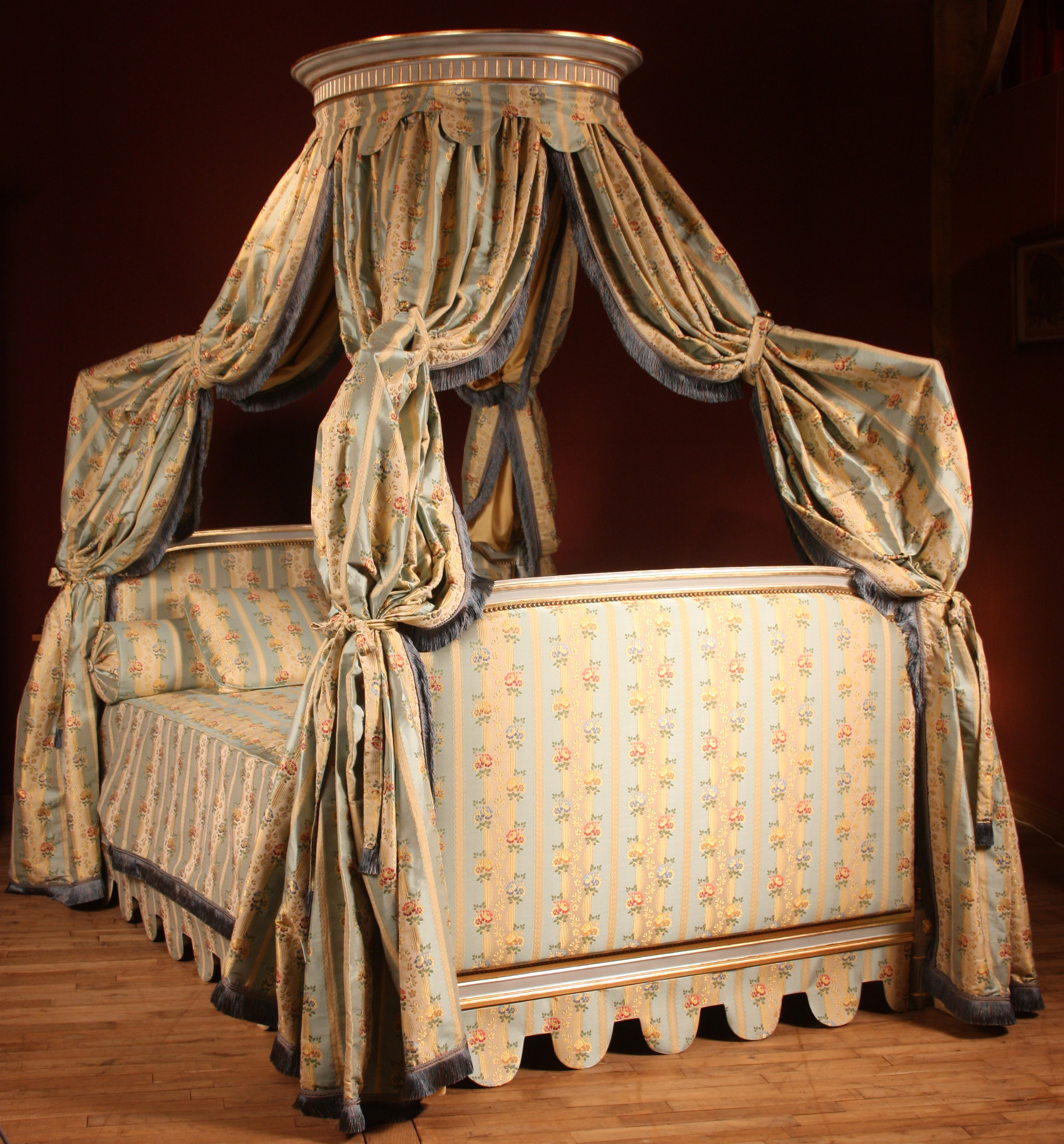
Louis XVI style, replica

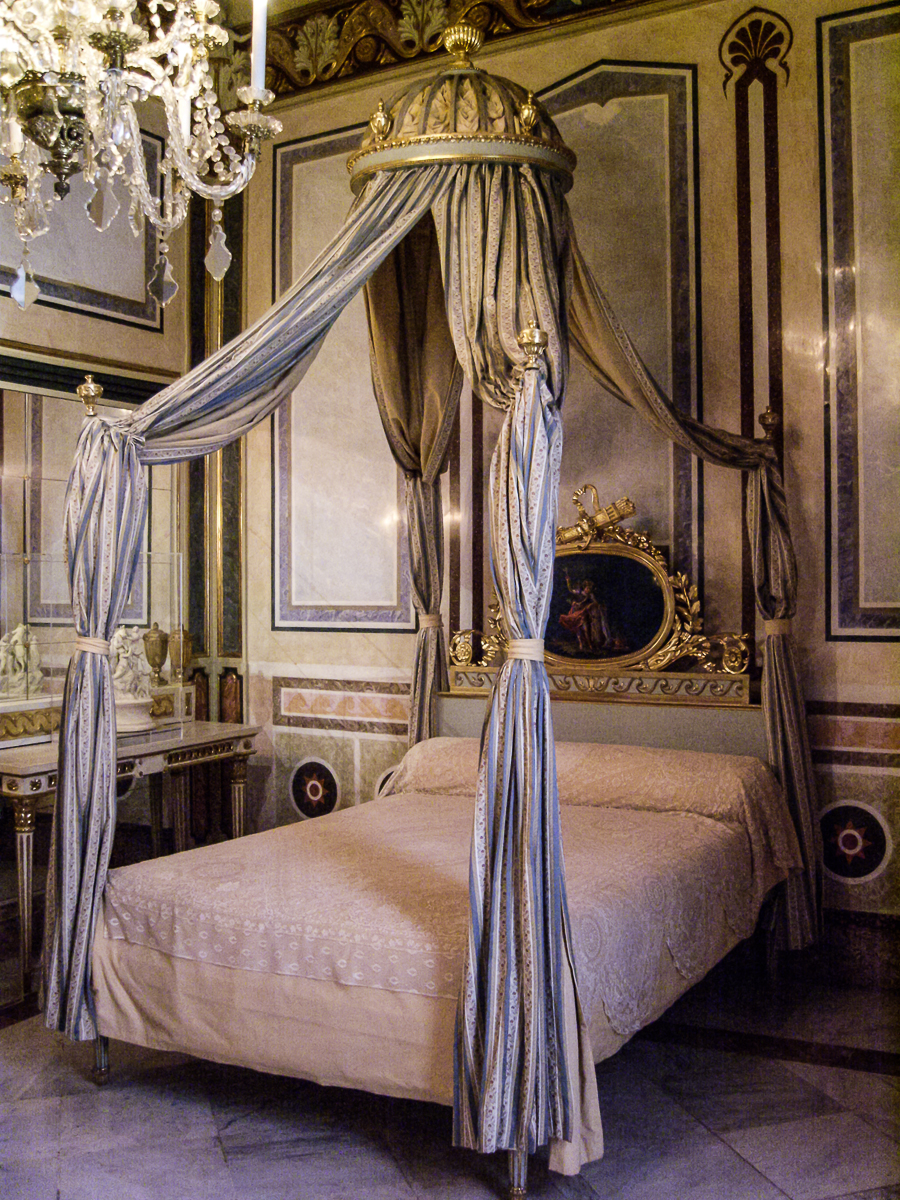
Palace of the Marqués de Dos Aguas. Poles follow catenary curve of the curtains, and are thus invisible.

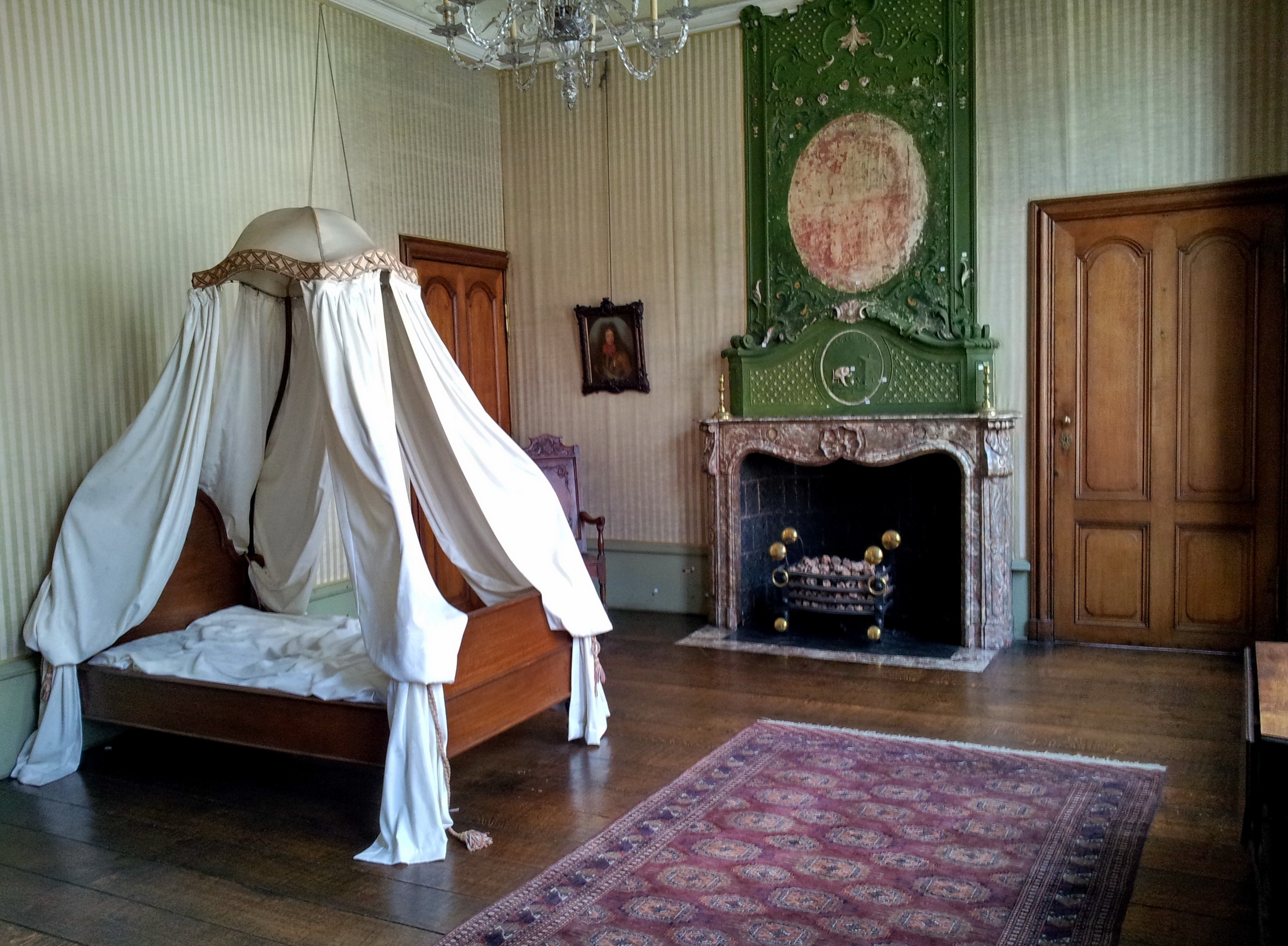
A simpler design at Hôtel d'Ansembourg, Liège, Belgium
