= Guillaume Beneman =

Parisian ébéniste of German extraction

Guillaume Beneman or Benneman (1750 – after 1811) was a prominent Parisian ébéniste, one of several of German extraction, working in the early neoclassical Louis XVI style, which was already fully developed when he arrived in Paris. Beneman arrived in Paris already trained; he was settled in the rue du Faubourg Saint-Antoine when he was received master in 1785 by royal command. He rapidly became the last of the royal cabinet-makers before the French Revolution, working under the direction (and on occasion to the designs) of the sculptor-entrepreneur Jean Hauré, fournisseur de la cour ("supplier to the Court").

In the service of the Garde-Meuble de la Couronne, he delivered works of irreproachable refinement to the royal residences into the first years of the Revolution. A mark of his humble condition and dependence upon the patronage of the Garde-Meuble is the payment to him in 1788 of 1527 livres, to enable him to purchase workshop tools for sixteen craftsmen.

== Career ==
An example of Beneman's luxurious earlier manner is the commode (circa 1785) with Italian pietra dura panels in the J. Paul Getty Museum. Attempts at economizing, as bankruptcy loomed for France in the final years of the Ancien Régime, recommended Beneman in preference to the extravagant Jean Henri Riesener, in 1785. For much of his work he was employed in reconstructing pieces in the royal furnishings or in supplying additional pieces en suite with existing ones, such as the bureau plat delivered 28 December 1786 for Louis XVI's Cabinet Intérieur at Versailles, which, under the artistic direction of the sculptor Jean Hauré, fournisseur de la Cour, meticulously follows the design and decor of the lower section of the Oeben/Riesener Bureau du Roi, or the secretaire in the Wrightsman Collection at the Metropolitan Museum, delivered in 1786 by Beneman for Compiègne, where the style was "dictated by certain earlier pieces by Joubert", F.J.B. Watson notes. A secrétaire and chest-of-drawers by Beneman can be seen in the Royal Palace of Madrid.

It is a characteristic of court arts generally speaking, that design and craftsmanship are collaborative in nature. Beneman collaborated with what Watson has called "a galaxy of talented craftsmen", instancing the ébéniste Guillaume Kemp, the bronziers Forestier, Thomire and Bardin, and the sculptors Boizot and Martin. To them might be added the ciseleur-doreur Galle. For a unique commission like the royal bureau plat of 1786, Martin provided a wax model of the original desk, Girard painted studies of fruit and flowers to be followed by Bertrand's designs, that were cut apart for the marquetry-cutters in Guillaume Kemp's workshop, Bardin and Thomire for finishing and mounting gilt-bronze myrtle moldings, gilded by Galle; Gosselin stamped in gilt the Morocco leather writing surface; Benneman sub-contracted the locksmith's work incorporated in his ébénisterie; his workers were paid 785 livres and he personally received 508 livres.

Under the Revolution, he continued to produce sober and massive case-pieces that combined the dark tonality of mahogany with delicate gilt-bronze mounts in the Directoire style. He was officially employed in 1792 to remove from sequestered furniture of the émigrés royal cyphers in marquetry and gilt-bronze mounts, as "emblems of feudality". After a period of eclipse during the Revolution, he enjoyed a further period of success under the Empire.

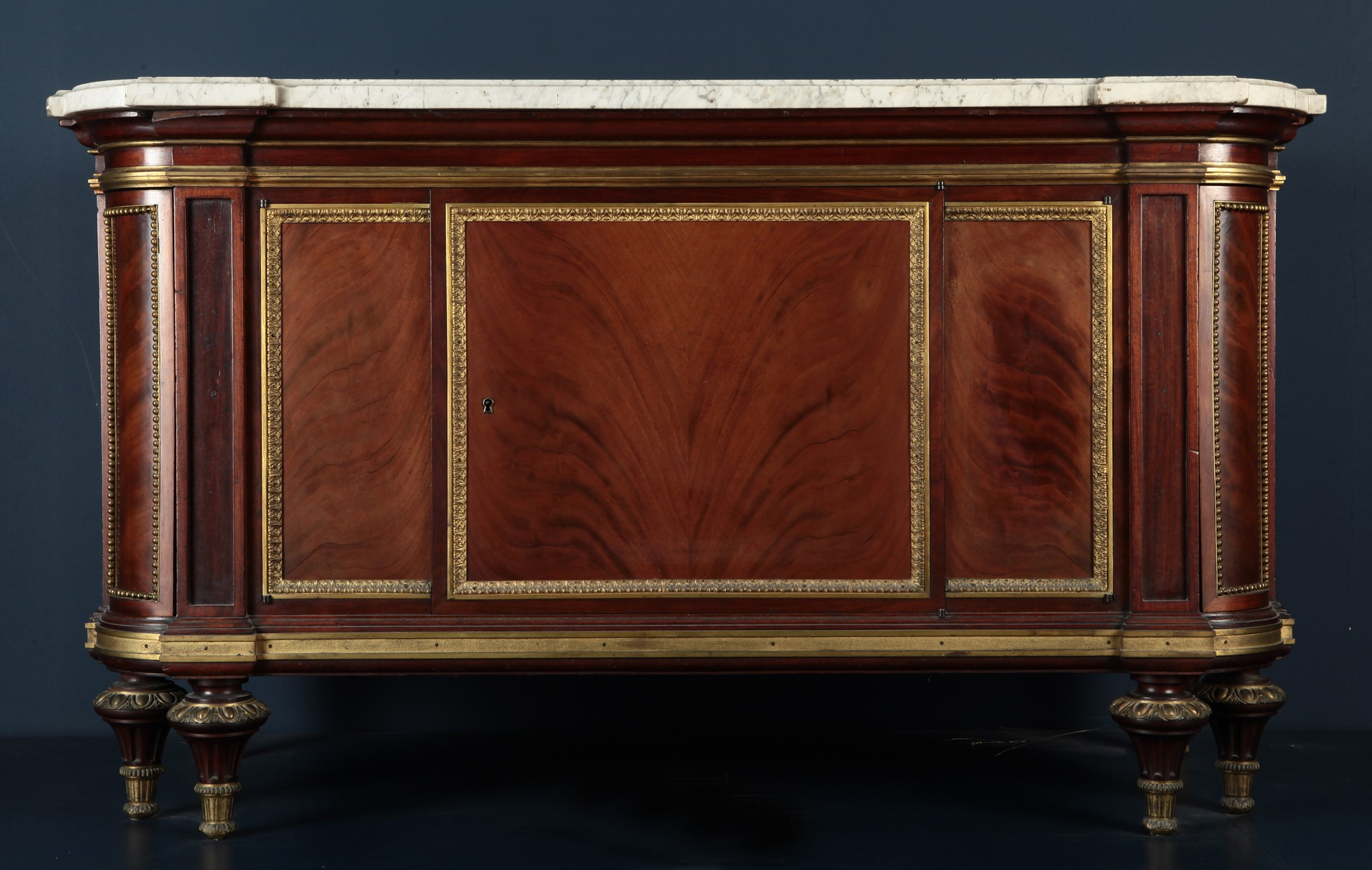
Commode à portes_musée national des Beaux-arts d'Argentine

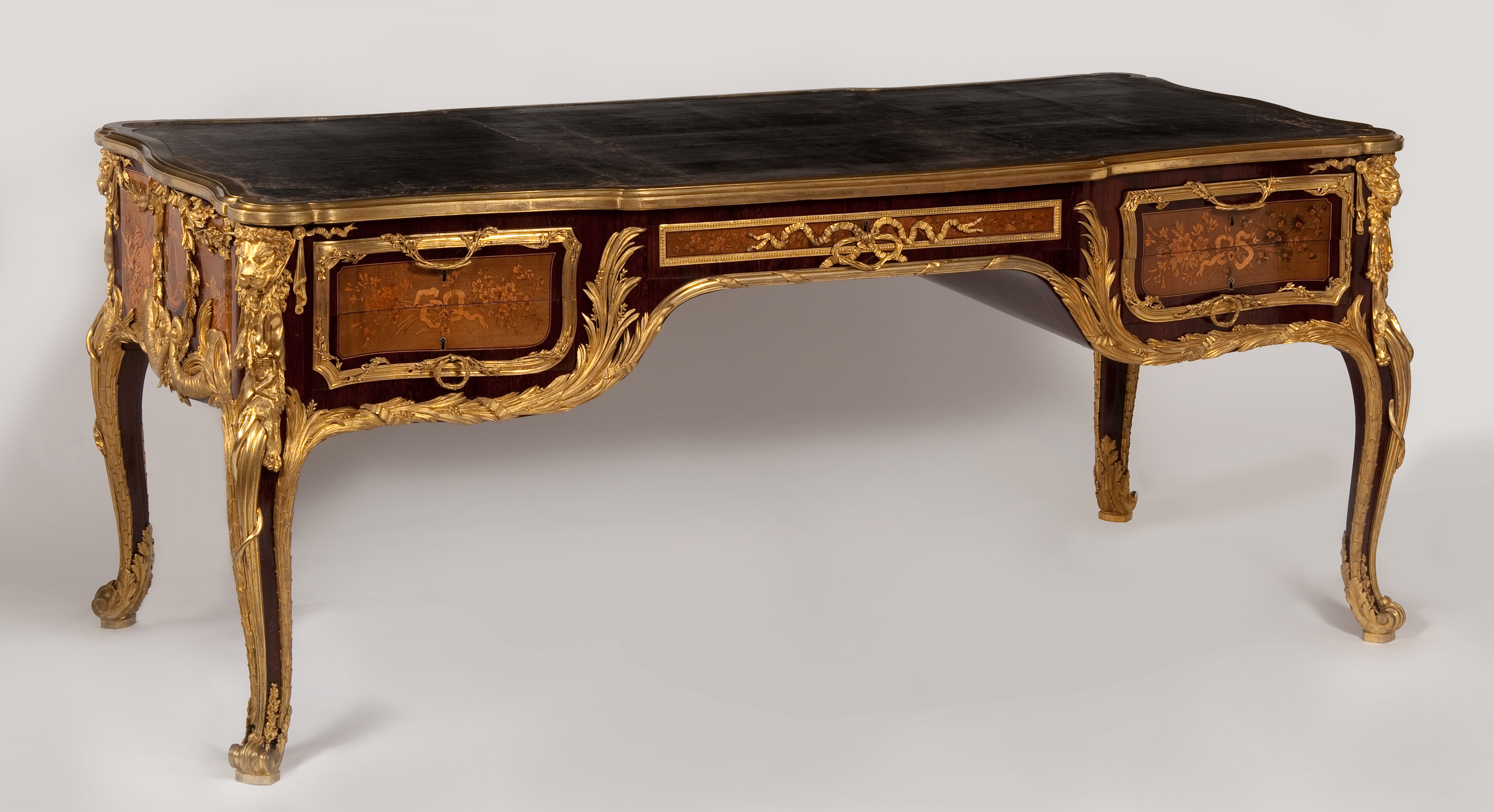
Bureau plat de 1786_collections de Waddesdon Manor

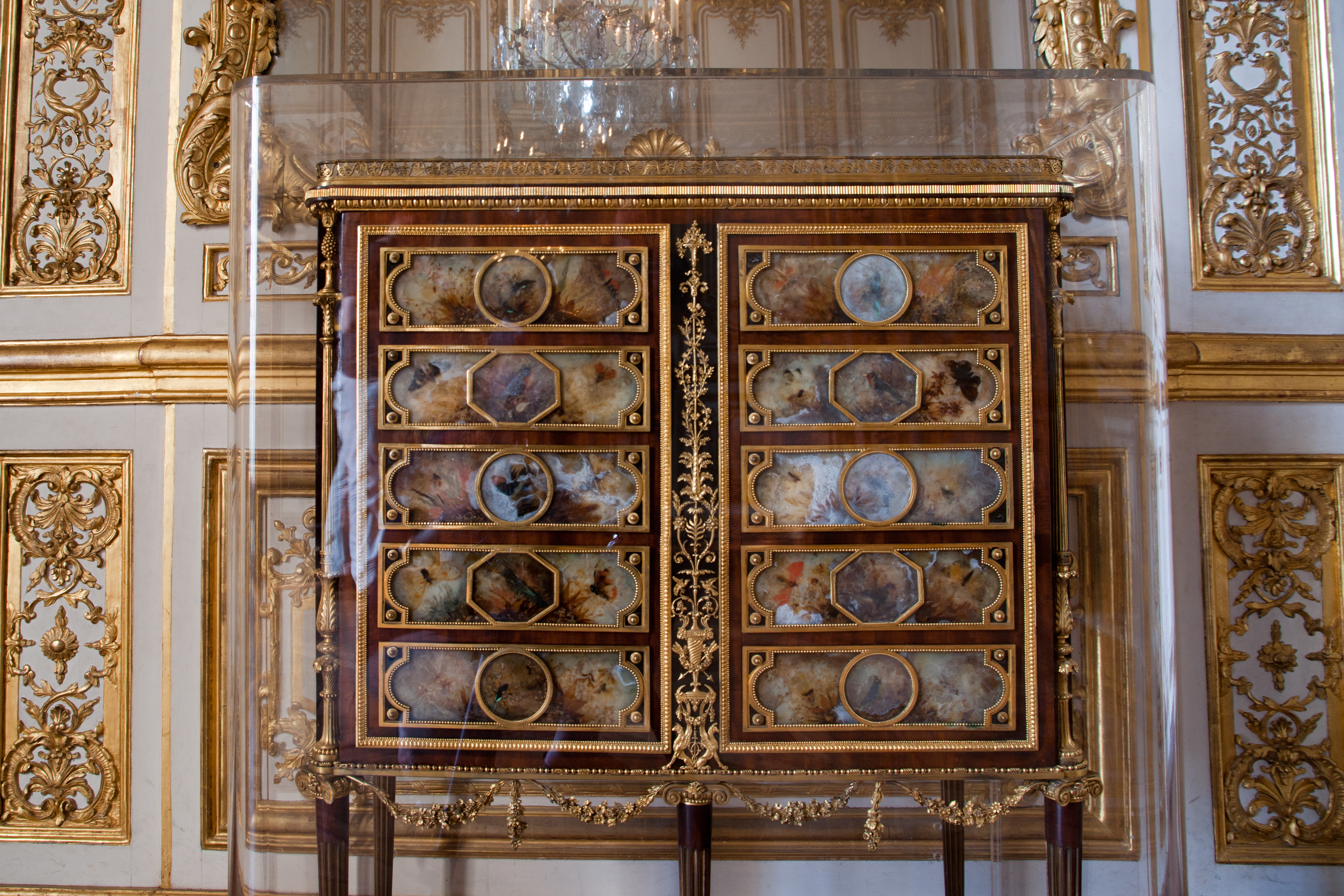
Médailler_petit appartement du Roi_Versailles

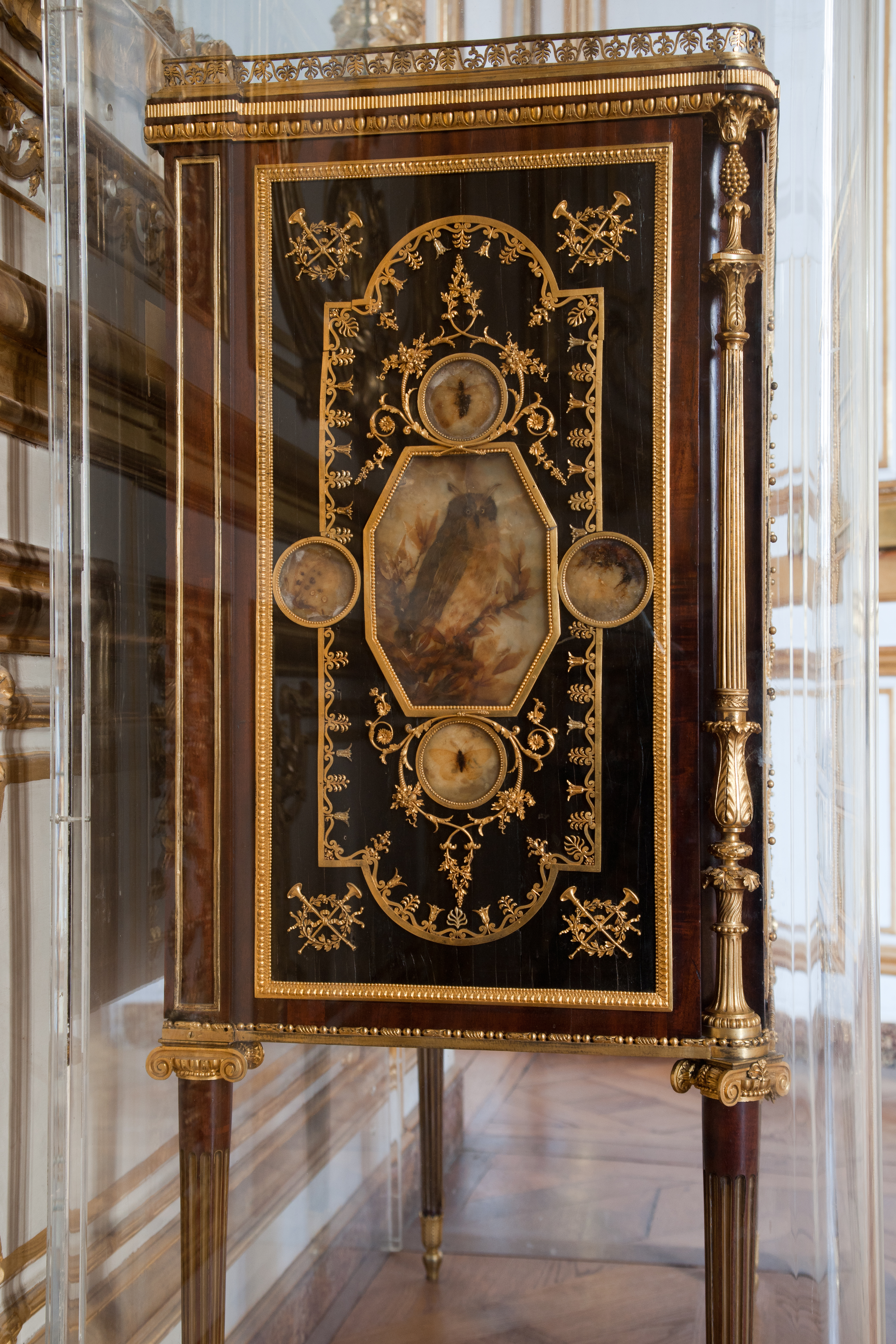
Médailler 2_petit appartement du Roi_Versailles

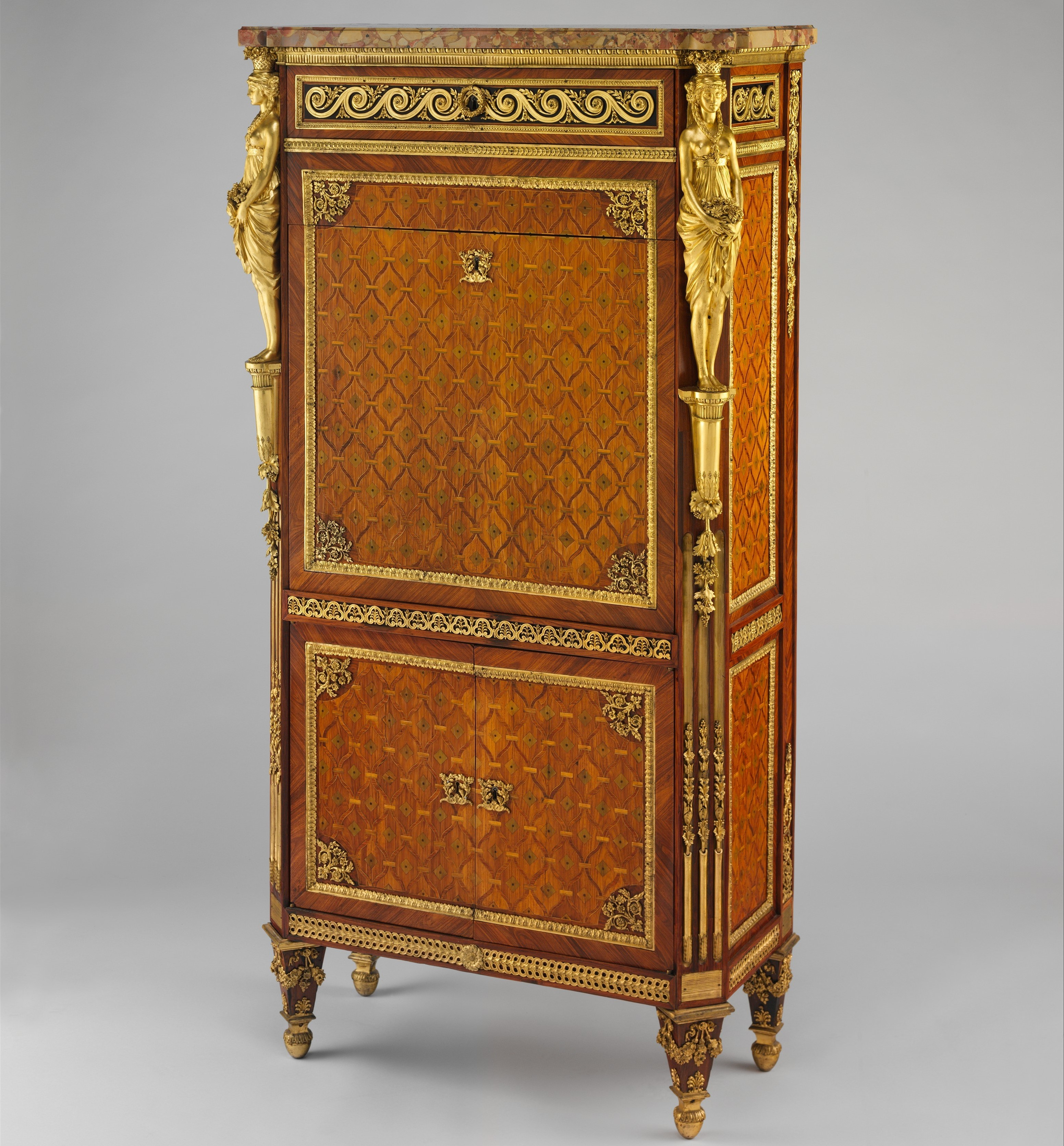
Secrétaire à abattant marqueté_Metropolitan Museum of Art
