= Juste Chevillet =

French engraver

- Born: 1729; Frankfurt an der Oder, Kingdom of Prussia
- Died: 1802 (aged 72–73); Paris, France
- Occupation: Engraver

Juste Chevillet (1729–1802) was a French engraver. He is known for his engravings for the Histoire Naturelle of Georges-Louis Leclerc, Comte de Buffon.

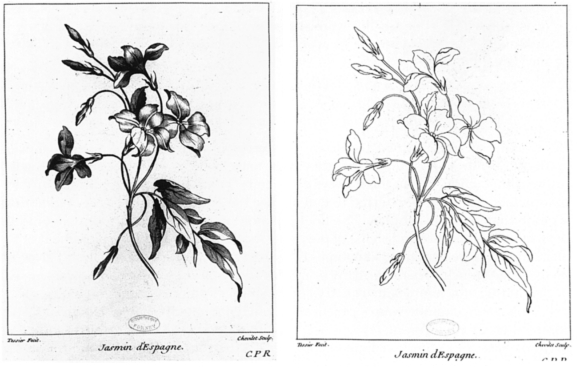
Jasmin d'Esagne by Juste Chevillet after Louis Tessier from the Livre de Principes de Fleurs

== Life ==
Juste Chevillet was born in 1729 in Frankfurt an der Oder. He studied engraving in Berlin under George Frederic Schmidt. He then moved to Paris to complete his studies with Johann Georg Wille, who became his brother-in-law. He probably reached Paris no earlier than 1750. The Livre de Principes de Fleurs, an undated compilation of engravings of flowers by Chevillet after drawings by Louis Tessier (c. 1719–81) was probably published some time after 1755. It was used as a source of decorations for the marquetry of Jean Henri Riesener (1734–1896). Other cabinet makers used the engravings for marquetry including Jean-Pierre Latz, Jean-François Oeben, Roger Vandercruse Lacroix, Abraham Roentgen (1711–93) and his son David Roentgen (1743-1807). The earliest dated example of such marquetry is a 1769 roll-top desk for King Louis XV by Riesener and Oeben.

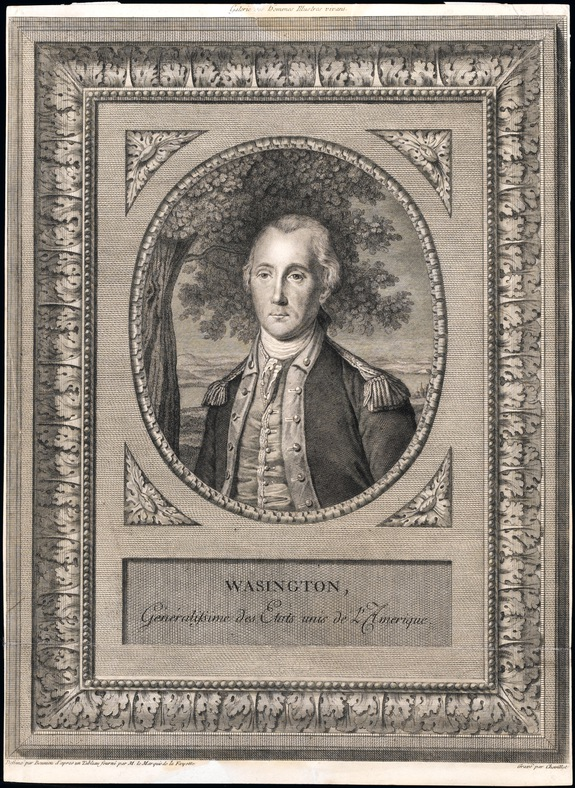
Engraving of George "Wasington". Later editions corrected the spelling.

Chevillet made an engraving of an oil painting of Benjamin Franklin by Joseph Duplessis that was used on a two-dollar note issued around 1828 by the Chemical Bank of New York City. The engraving was made in 1778 from the original owned by Jacques-Donatien Le Ray de Chaumont, who had hosted Franklin at the Hôtel Valentinois in Passy. He made an engraving of George Washington after a design by Michel Honoré Bounieu. Chevillet was living in Paris in 1795. He died in Paris around 1800 or 1802.

== Selected works ==
Other works by Chevillet include:

- Chardin (Jean-Baptiste-Simeon), French painter (1771). Bust after a self-portrait
- Diderot (Denis). Bust after a drawing by Bounieu of a bust by M. Houdon
- Louis-Philippe, duc d'Orleans. bust drawn and engraved by Chevillet.
- Hannetaire (Eugenie). Portrait of the actress as a young sultaness, after Le Gendre
- Jordan (Jean-Louis), businessman. 1762
- Lenoir, lieutenant de police. 1778. Bust
- Sartine (A.-R.-J.-G. de), comte d'Alby, lieutenant general de police

== Histoire naturelle ==
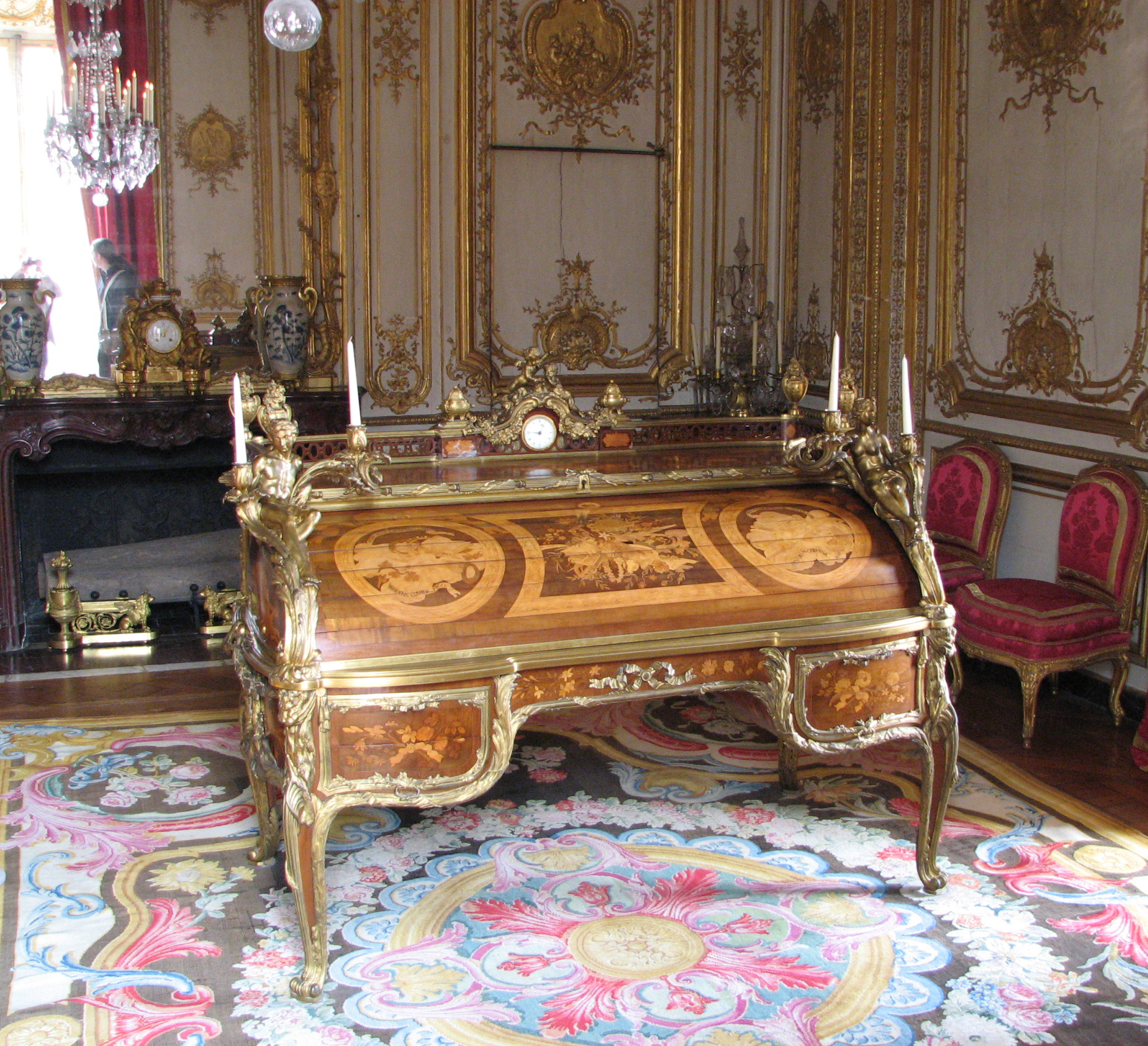
Bureau du Roi by Jean Henri Riesener with marquetry designs copied from Chevillet's engravings

Chevillet made the engravings for several volumes of Buffon's great Histoire naturelle:

- Bernard Germain de Lacépède (1788), Illustrations de Histoire naturelle des quadrupèdes ovipares et des serpens (in French), vol. I, Dessinateur : Jacques de Sève;Graveur : Juste Chevillet, Sébastien Leroy, M. R. V. Tardieu, Paris: Hotel de Thou, p. 45
- Bernard Germain de Lacépède (1789), Illustrations de Histoire naturelle des serpens (in French), vol. II, Dessinateur : Jacques de Sève; Graveur : Juste Chevillet, De Launay, M. R. V. Tardieu, Paris: Hotel de Thou, p. 24
- Georges-Louis Leclerc, Comte de Buffon (1778), Illustrations de Histoire naturelle générale et particulière] Supplément (in French), vol. III, Graveur : Aldring, Juste Chevillet, Pasch, Paris: Imprimerie royale, p. 9
- Georges-Louis Leclerc, Comte de Buffon (1761), Illustrations de Histoire naturelle générale et particulière avec la description du cabinet du roy (in French), Dessinateur : Buvée, Jacques de Sève; Graveur : Jean Charles Baquoy, Juste Chevillet, Louis Legrand, Paris: Imprimerie royale, p. 42
- Georges-Louis Leclerc, Comte de Buffon (1760), Illustrations de Histoire naturelle générale et particulière avec la description du cabinet du roy (in French), vol. VIII, Dessinateur : Buvée, Jacques de Sève; Graveur : Jean Charles Baquoy, Juste Chevillet, Louis Legrand, Paris: Imprimerie royale, p. 56
- Georges-Louis Leclerc, Comte de Buffon (1764), Illustrations de Histoire naturelle générale et particulière avec la description du cabinet du roy (in French), vol. XII, Dessinateur : Buvée, Jacques de Sève; Graveur : Jean Charles Baquoy, Juste Chevillet, Louis Legrand, Paris: Imprimerie royale, p. 60
- Georges-Louis Leclerc, Comte de Buffon (1765), Illustrations de Histoire naturelle générale et particulière avec la description du cabinet du roy (in French), vol. XIII, Dessinateur : Buvée, Jacques de Sève; Graveur : Jean Charles Baquoy, Juste Chevillet, Louis Legrand, Paris: Imprimerie royale, p. 61
- Georges-Louis Leclerc, Comte de Buffon (1766), Illustrations de Histoire naturelle générale et particulière avec la description du cabinet du roy (in French), vol. XIV, Dessinateur : Buvée, Jacques de Sève; Graveur : Jean Charles Baquoy, Juste Chevillet, Louis Legrand, Paris: Imprimerie royale, p. 43

== Sources ==
- Andresen, Andreas; Heller, Joseph; Wessely, Josef Eduard (1870), Handbuch für Kupferstichsammler, oder, Lexicon der Kupperstecher, Maler-Radirer und Formschneider aller Länder und Schulen nach Massgabe ihrer geschätztesten Blätter und Werke, auf Grundlage der 2en Aufl. von Heller's Practischem Handbuch für Kupferstichsammler neu bearb. von A. Andresen (fortgesetzt von J.E. Wessely).
- Craven, Wayne (Spring 1971), "Asher B. Durand's Career as an Engraver", The American Art Journal, 3 (1), Kennedy Galleries, Inc.: 39–57, doi:10.2307/1593884, JSTOR 1593884
- Douen, Emmanuel Orentin (1879), Les premiers pasteurs du désert, 1685-1700, Grassart
- Firmin-Didot, Ambroise (1877), Les graveurs de portraits en France: catalogue raisonné de la collection des portraits de l'école française, Firmin-Didot
- Greenough, Charles Pelham (1919), "February Meeting. Gifts to the Society; Bunker Hill and Temperance; Ezekiel Carré; James Bradley Thayer", Proceedings of the Massachusetts Historical Society, Third Series, 52 October 1918 – June 1919, Massachusetts Historical Society: 117–138, JSTOR 25080087
- Huber, Michel; Rost, Carl Christian Heinrich; Martini, C. J. (1797), Manuel des curieux et des amateurs de l'art, contenant une notice abrégée des principaux graveurs, et un catalogue raisonné de leurs meilleurs ouvrages; depuis le commencement de la gravure jusques à nos jours: les artistes rangés par ordre chronologique, et divisés par école: École allemande, Orell, Gessner, Fuesslin et comp.
- Juste Chevillet (1729-1802?) - Graveur (in French), BnF
- Mumford, L. Quincy (31 August 1956), "Catalogue of Franklin Exhibition in the Library of Congress", Proceedings of the American Philosophical Society, 100 (4), American Philosophical Society: 385–416, JSTOR 3143767
- "Was[h]ington, Generalissime des Etats-unis de L'Amerique". Mount Vernon Ladies’ Association.
- Yannick Chastang (2007), "Louis Tessier's "Livre de Principes de Fleurs" and the Eighteenth-Century "Marqueteur"", Furniture History, 43, Furniture History Society: 115–126, JSTOR 23410056
