= Baquoy =

Baquoy is a surname. Notable people with the surname include:

- Jean Charles Baquoy (1721–1777), French engraver
- Maurice Baquoy (c. 1680–1747), French engraver
- Pierre Charles Baquoy (1759–1829), French painter and engraver
