= Gilles Joubert =

Parisian ébéniste

Gilles Joubert (1689–1775) was a Parisian ébéniste who worked for the Garde-Meuble of Louis XV for two and a half decades, beginning in 1748, earning the title ébéniste ordinaire du Garde-Meuble in 1758, and finally that of ébéniste du roi ("royal cabinet-maker") on the death of Jean-François Oeben in 1763. He produced case furniture in a robust Rococo style, ranging from simple veneered bidets to grand commodes that integrated gilt-bronze mounts into the forms of furniture with subtle three-dimensional curves (bombé). From the later 1760s his furniture increasingly shows a conservative compromise with the nascent neoclassical style.

The date of Joubert's admission to the corporation des maiîtres ébénistes is missing, along with the early guild archives, but he was already syndic in 1749-50.

Much of his furniture was produced before Parisian guild regulations required ébénistes to stamp their production, and pieces intended for the royal Garde-Meuble were exempt from such regulations; however, the minutely detailed inventory descriptions of the Garde-Meuble de la Couronne and inventory numbers stencilled on surviving furniture have enabled scholars to identify a number of pieces from Joubert's workshop. Francis Watson suggested that Joubert's marriage to a relative of Pierre II Migeon, a favoured cabinet-maker of Madame de Pompadour, may have brought him to her attention and likely through her to court commissions. For the Château de Choisy he produced, with the engineer Guérin, the famous table volante that rose through the floor for private suppers. In the decade following 1763 he supplied 2200 pieces of furniture to the court; under the pressure of such a volume of commissions, he was obliged to subcontract even some important pieces of furniture: the roll-top desk he delivered to the comtesse de Provence, 30 December 1773, (Museu Calouste Gulbenkian, Lisbon) was actually made by Jean Henri Riesener, who would succeed him as ébéniste du roi. In the Frick Collection, New York, is a royal commode delivered by Joubert in 1769 but stamped by Roger Vandercruse Lacroix.

Among his most celebrated pieces are the corner cupboards (encoignures) made in 1755 for Louis XV's Cabinet de Médailles at Versailles (Bibliothèque nationale). Not all the furniture delivered by Joubert received a favourable reception: a bombé commode painted with flowers on a white Vernis Martin ground (now yellowed), with silvered-bronze mounts, delivered 11 January 1755 for Madame Adelaïde at Versailles, was returned to the Garde-Meuble the same day.

In June 1774 the octogenarian Joubert contracted with Riesener to assign the younger man his workshop and its contents with the good will of his clientele.

== Collection ==
Bureau Plat

- Bureau Plat, delivered to Louis XV for the cabinet intérieur at Versailles, 1759, Metropolitan Museum of Art, United States

Commode

- Commode, delivered for the Chambre de Madame Adelaide, daughter of Louis XV, at the Château de Marly, 1774, V&A, UK;
- Commode, delivered bedchamber of the Comtesse d'Artois, Palace of Versailles, 1773, Floors Castle, UK;
- Commode, delivered (as a pair) for the bedchamber of Madame Louise, daughter of Louis XV, 1769, Getty Museum, United States;
- Commode, delivered (as a pair) for the Salon de Compagnie of Mademoiselle Du Barry at Versailles, Walker Art Gallery, UK
- Commode, (produced by Roger Lacroix, directed by Joubert) delivered to Madame Victoire de France for the Chateau de Compiègne, 1769, Frick Collection, United States

Pedestal

- Pair of pedestals, for the bedroom of Louis XV at Versailles, 1762, Royal Collection, UK

Secrétaire à abattant

- Secrétaire à abattant, delivered for the Chambre de Madame Adelaide, daughter of Louis XV, at the Château de Marly, 1774, V&A, UK;
