= Jean Charles Baquoy =

French engraver

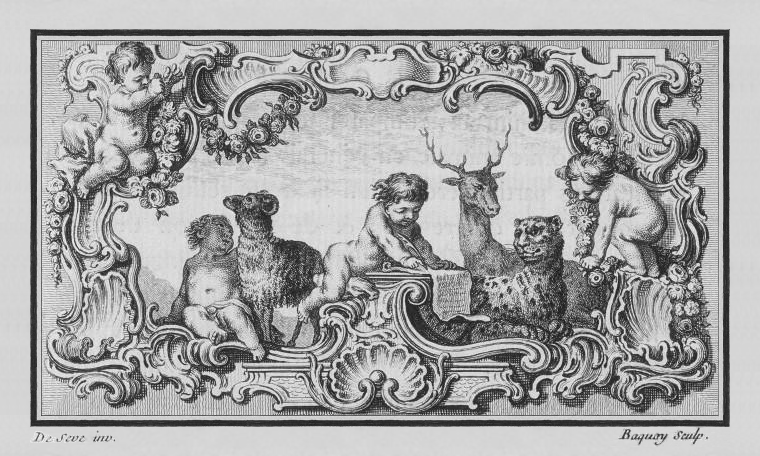
Essay on the Nature of Animals by Jean Charles Baquoy, image from the French book "Illustrations de Histoire naturelle générale et particulière avec la Description du Cabinet du Roy", 1753

Jean Charles Baquoy (1721–1777) was a French engraver.

Baquoy was born and died in Paris. The eldest son of Maurice Baquoy, he engraved book-plates after the designs of Eisen, Gravelot, Moreau, and others, among which are a set of vignettes for the French translation of Ovid's Metamorphoses, published by Basan, which are executed in a finished style, and a set of plates, after Jean-Baptiste Oudry, for the Fables of La Fontaine. He also made engravings after Boucher, Watteau, J. Vernet, Wouwerman, and others.
