= Jean Henri Riesener =

German ébéniste (cabinetmaker)

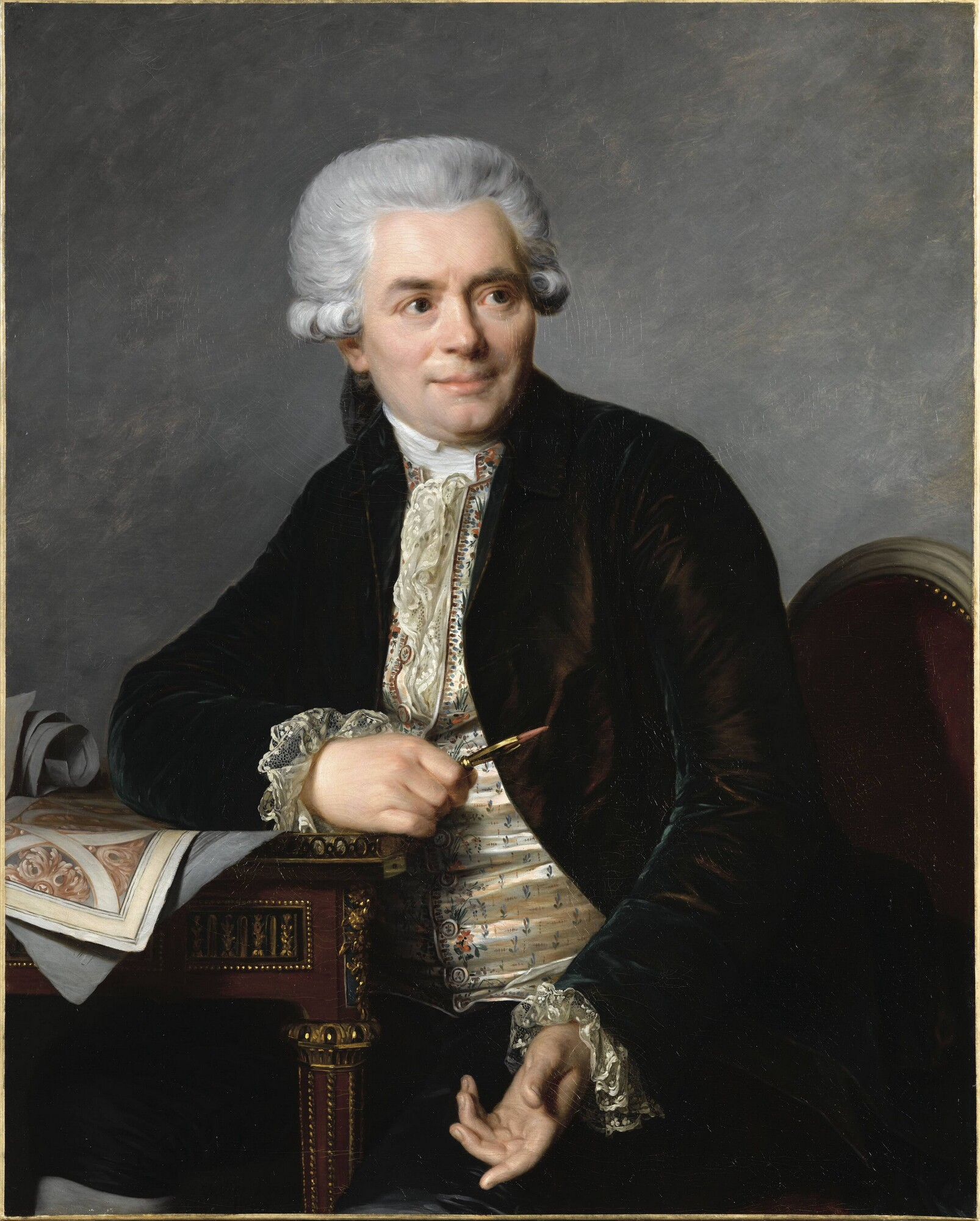
Portrait of Jean-Henri Riesener, seated at one of his writing tables, by Antoine Vestier, 1786 (Musée de Versailles).

Jean-Henri Riesener (German: Johann Heinrich Riesener; 4 July 1734 – 6 January 1806) was an eminent German ébéniste (cabinetmaker), working in Paris. His work exemplified the early neoclassical "Louis XVI style".

== Life and career ==
Riesener was born in Gladbeck, Electorate of Cologne, Holy Roman Empire. He moved to Paris, where he apprenticed soon after 1754 with Jean-François Oeben, whose widow he later married; he was received master ébéniste in January 1768. The following year, he began supplying furniture for the Crown and in July 1774 formally became ébéniste ordinaire du roi, "the greatest Parisian ébéniste of the Louis XVI period." Riesener was responsible for some of the finest examples of furniture in the Louis XVI style, as the French court embarked on furnishing commissions on a luxurious scale that had not been seen since the time of Louis XIV: between 1774 and 1784, he received on average commissions amounting to 100,000 livres per annum.

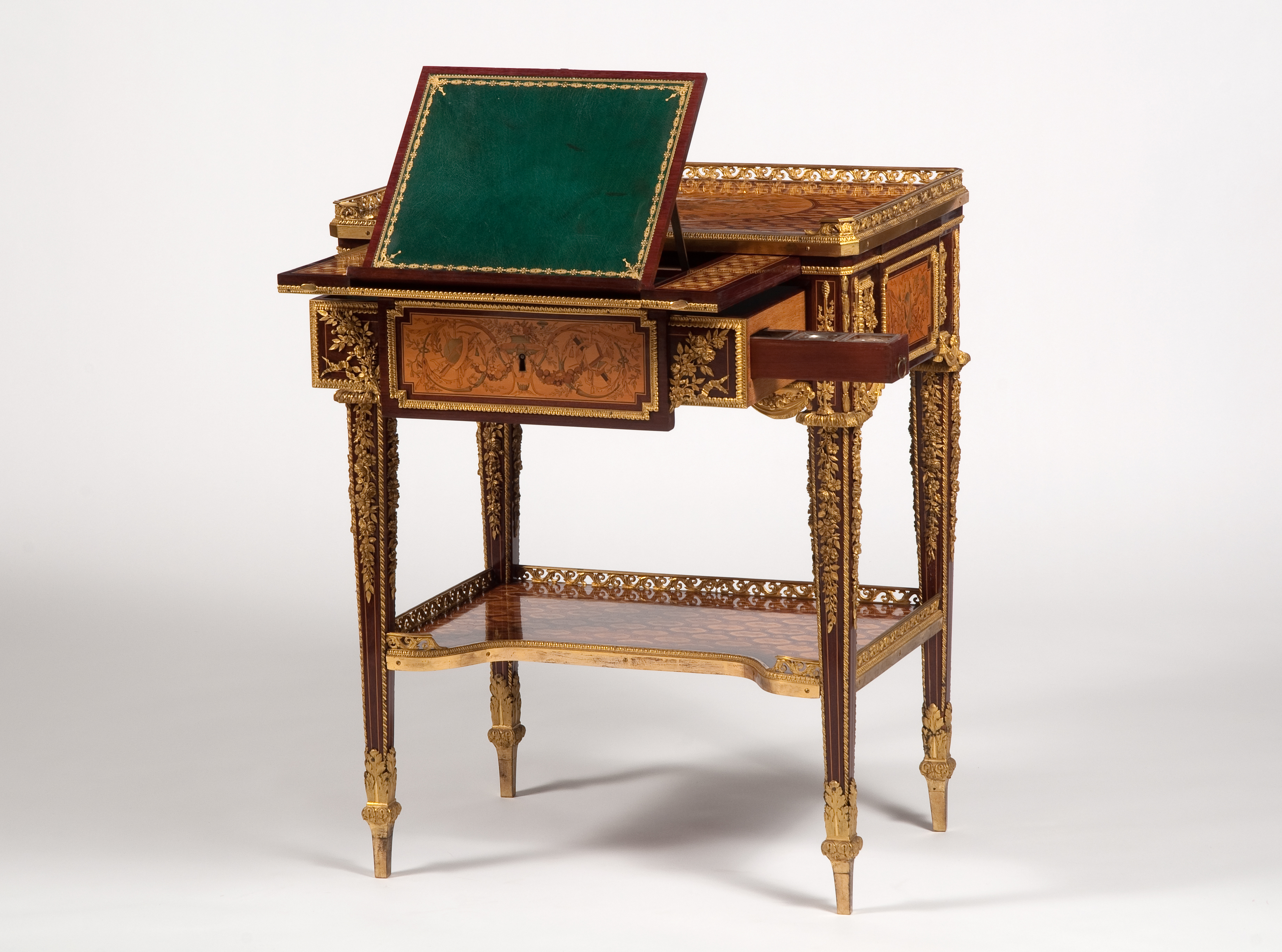
Writing table made for Marie Antoinette, 1780–85 at Waddesdon Manor.

Riesener and David Roentgen were Marie Antoinette's favourite cabinet-makers. Besides commissions directly to the Garde-Meuble he delivered case furniture for the Count and Countess of Provence, the Count of Artois, Mesdames the King's aunts, and the dukes of Penthièvre, de la Rochefoucauld, Choiseul-Praslin, Biron, as well as rich fermiers généraux.

He used floral and figural marquetry techniques to a great extent, contrasting with refined parquetry and trelliswork grounds, in addition to gilt-bronze mounts. His carcases were more finely finished than those of many of his Parisian contemporaries, and he attempted to disguise the screwheads that attached his mounts with overhanging details of foliage. It seems likely that as a royal craftsman he was able to circumvent guild restrictions and produce his own ormolu|gilt-bronze mounts: Riesener's princely portrait by Antoine Vestier shows the cabinet-maker at one of his richly-mounted tables, with drawings for gilt-bronze mounts. Many of his pieces featured complicated mechanisms that raised or lowered table-tops or angled reading stands. Through his wife he was related to other master craftsmen in Paris, notably the ébénistes Roger Vandercruse Lacroix and Martin Carlin.

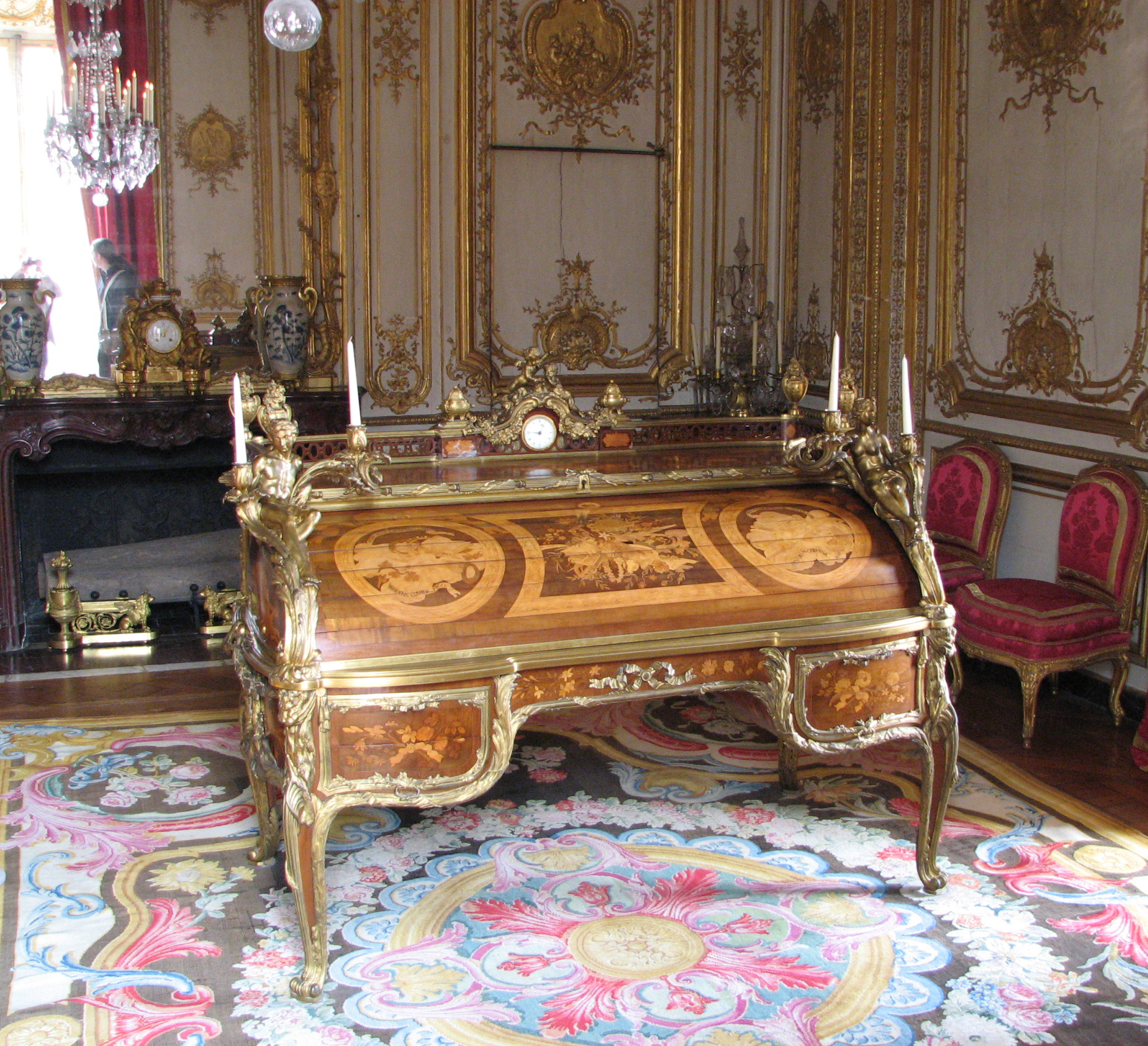
Bureau du Roi, delivered to Louis XV.

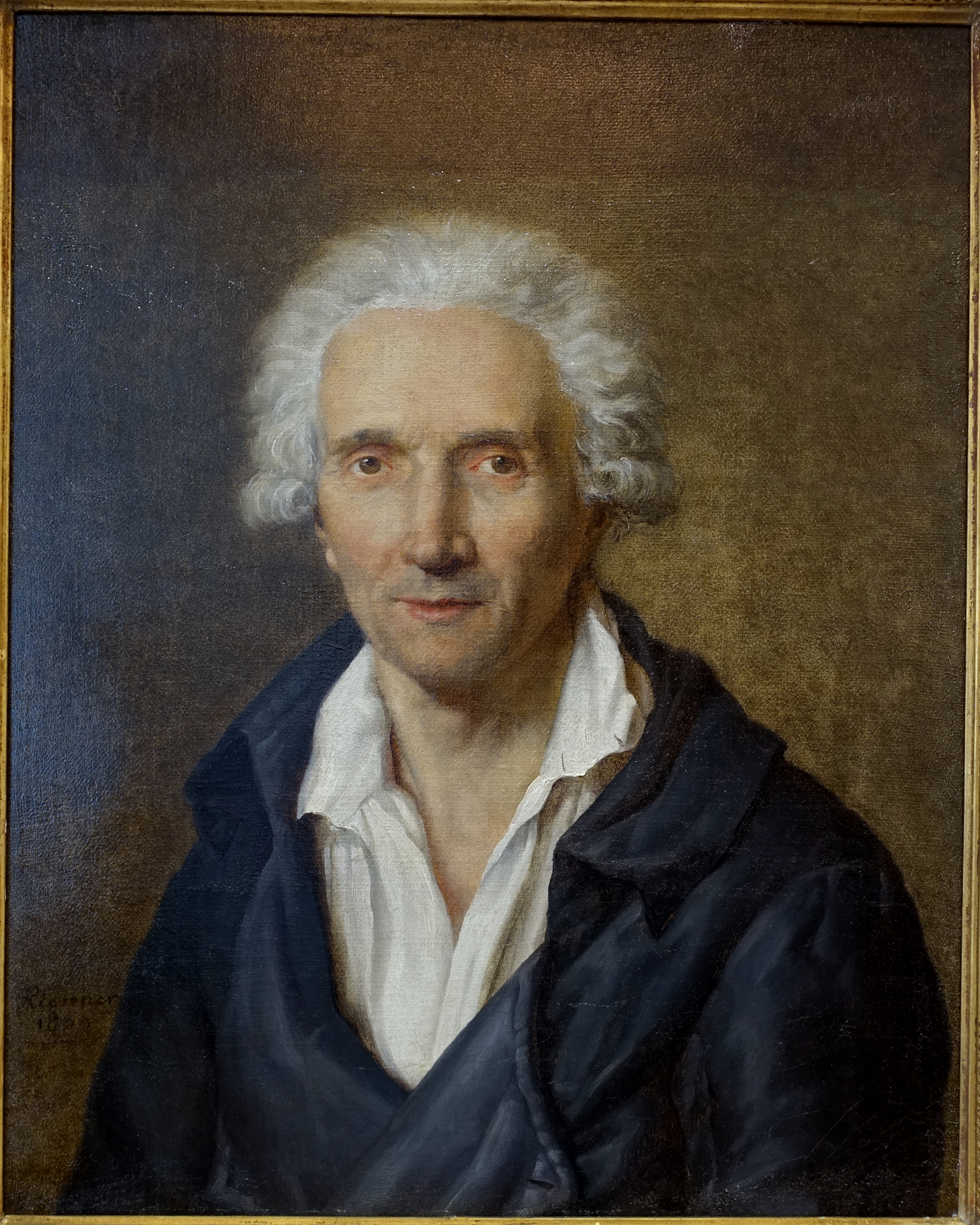
Portrait of Jean-Henri Riesener by his son, Henri-François Riesener, 1800 (Waddesdon Manor)). In this later portrait, Riesener is depicted with a degree of intimacy and informality, in contrast to his portrait by Vestier, which shows him as a man of court, dressed in elaborate clothes and seated at a table.

He completed the Bureau du Roi, which had been started in 1760, under his predecessor and master, Oeben; his name alone appears in the marquetry.

The floral designs were derived from the Livre de Principes de Fleurs, an undated compilation of engravings of flowers by Juste Chevillet after drawings by Louis Tessier.

In 1774 he delivered the commode for the bedroom of Louis XVI at Versailles, now in the Royal Collection at Windsor Castle. An even richer commode replaced it the following year (now at the Château de Chantilly).

The drop-front secretary (sécretaire à abattant) initially designed by Oeben, or by Riesener in Oeben's workshop, presents a vertical rectangle of superposed panels and a frieze, on short legs. The upper panel drops down to provide a writing surface, revealing a fitted interior.

From 1784, with France near bankruptcy, the pace of court commissions dropped radically; Thierry de Ville d'Avray succeeded Pierre-Elizabeth de Fontanieu at the Garde-Meuble le la Couronne and turned for necessary economy to less expensive suppliers, such as Guillaume Beneman; Riesener's last pieces for the court featured sober but richly-figured West Indian mahogany veneers and more restrained use of gilt-bronze mounts. Queen Marie Antoinette continued to favour Riesener through the 1780s.

With the French Revolution, Riesener was retained by the Directory, and sent in 1794 to Versailles to remove the "insignia of feudality" from furniture he had recently made: royal cyphers and fleurs-de-lys were replaced with innocuous panels. During the French revolutionary sales he ruined himself by buying back furniture that was being sold at derisory prices. When he attempted to resell his accumulated stock, tastes had changed and the old clientele dispersed or dead. After a short secondary career in property speculation, Riesener died in relative obscurity in Paris in 1806.

== The Riesener Project ==
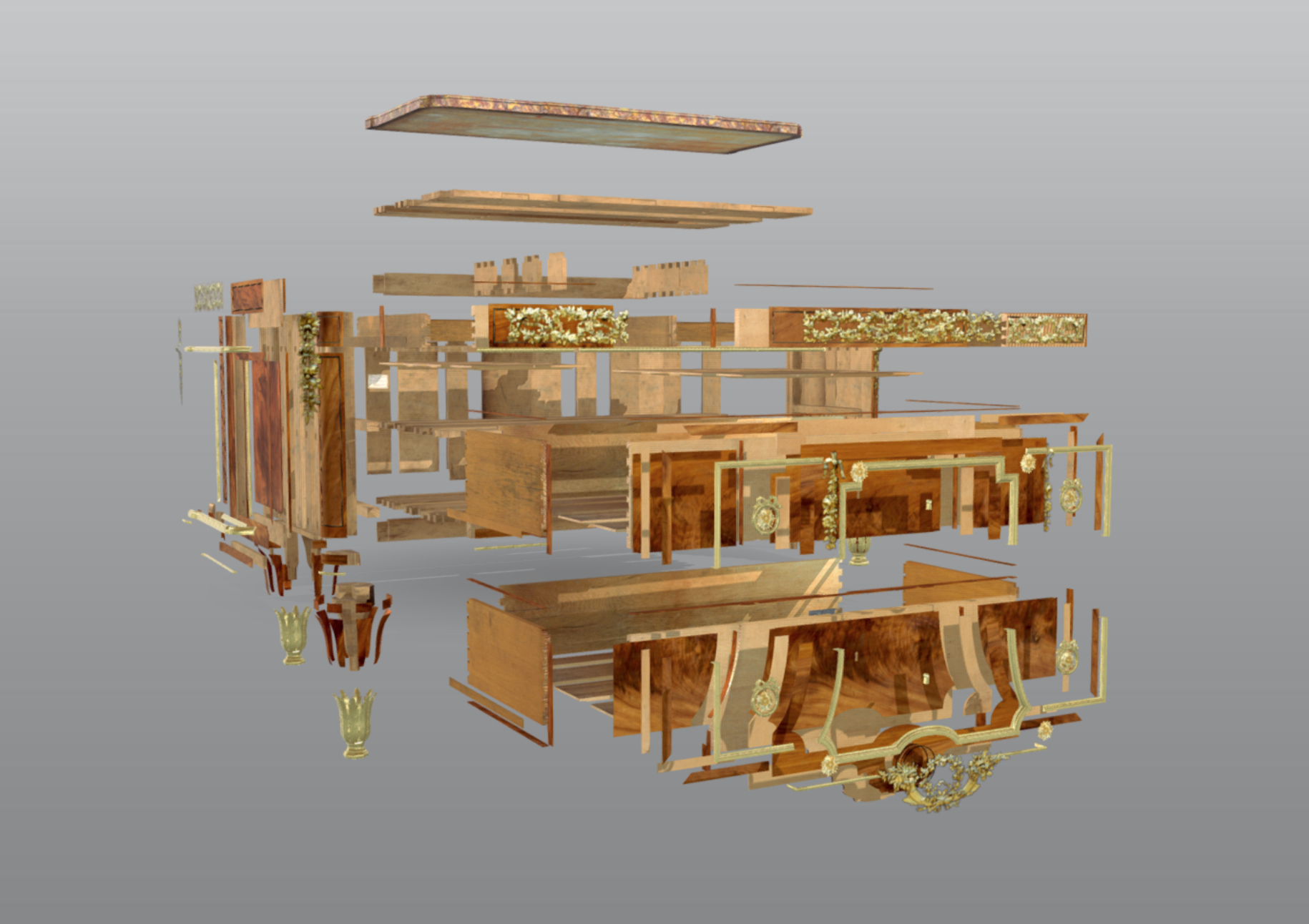
An interactive 3D model of a Riesener chest of drawers at the Wallace Collection.

Jean-Henri Riesener and his furniture was the subject of a six-year research project carried out by curators and conservators at the Wallace Collection, Waddesdon Manor and the Royal Collection. Close examination of the thirty pieces of Riesener furniture in the three collections, along with art historical and archival research, revealed much that was previously unknown about the materials and techniques the cabinetmaker used, as well as his workshop practices. The Project also explored the development of the market for Riesener's furniture in the nineteenth century, and the influence that his designs and cabinetmaking techniques had on later furniture-makers.

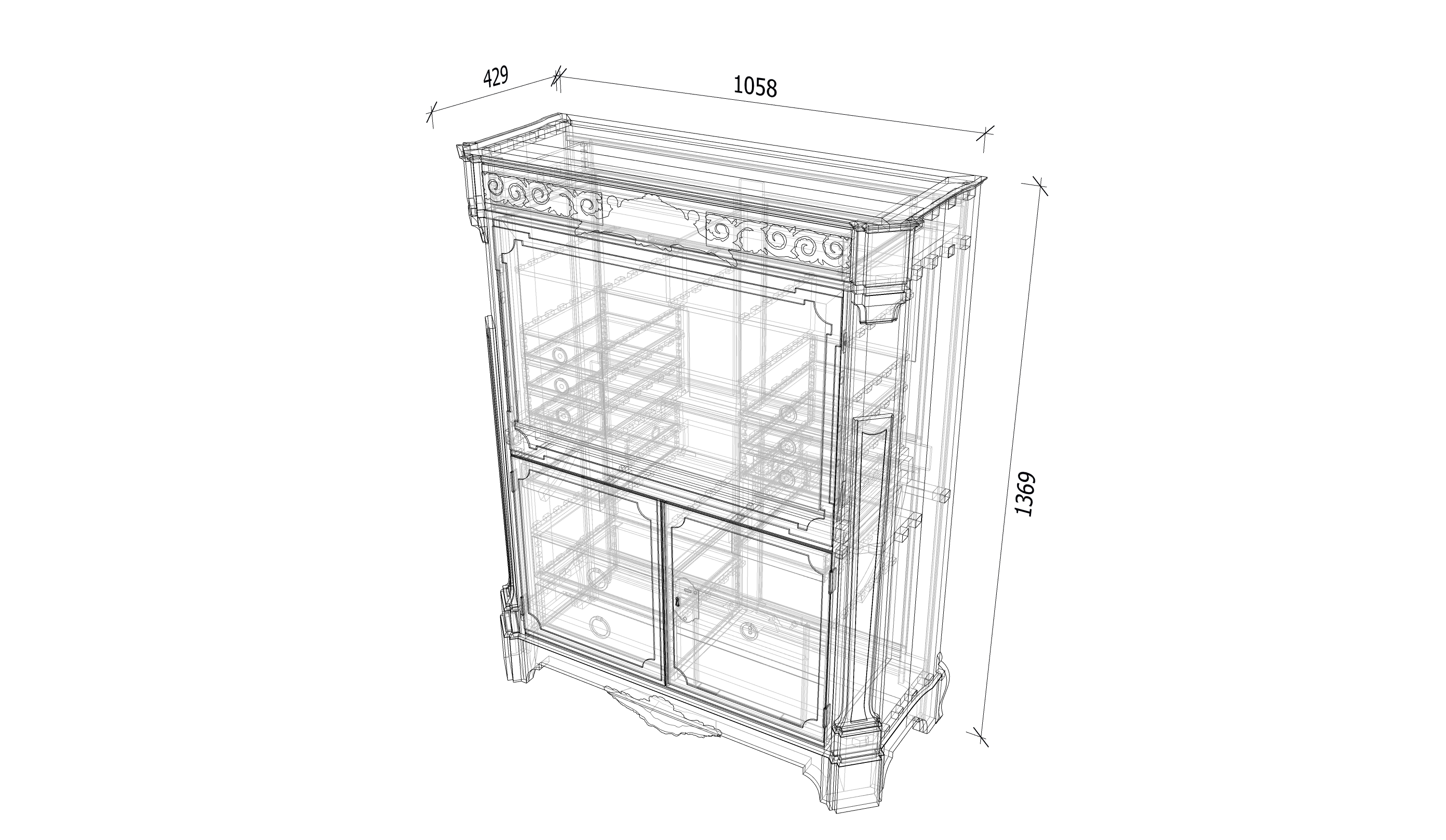
An isometric drawing of a Riesener fall-front desk at the Wallace Collection.

The findings of the Project led to the publishing of the first major monograph on Riesener, while the detailed technical examination of the materials, structure and condition of the objects that took place, along with scientific analysis, allowed for interactive 3D models to be created. The models reveal the great complexity involved in making such furniture, as well as Riesener's ingenuity and resourcefulness as a craftsmen. They can be explored through a comprehensive microsite and trail dedicated to Riesener, along with catalogue entries, essays, videos and isometric drawings.

== Collections ==
As a result of the French Revolutionary Sales in the early nineteenth century, UK collectors had bought for the decoration of their stately homes and palaces significant numbers of French royal furniture (mobilier royal), which today forms the basis of the great collections that still remain in the UK. Towards the end of the industrial age until the agricultural depression of the 1920s, large numbers of works, predominately in UK collections were auctioned off and made their passage to American collectors. Still to this date UK collections are especially rich in the works of French furniture and decorative arts, particularly of Royal provenance, and the UK continues to enjoy perhaps the greatest repository of Riesener's works outside Paris.

=== Writing-table ===
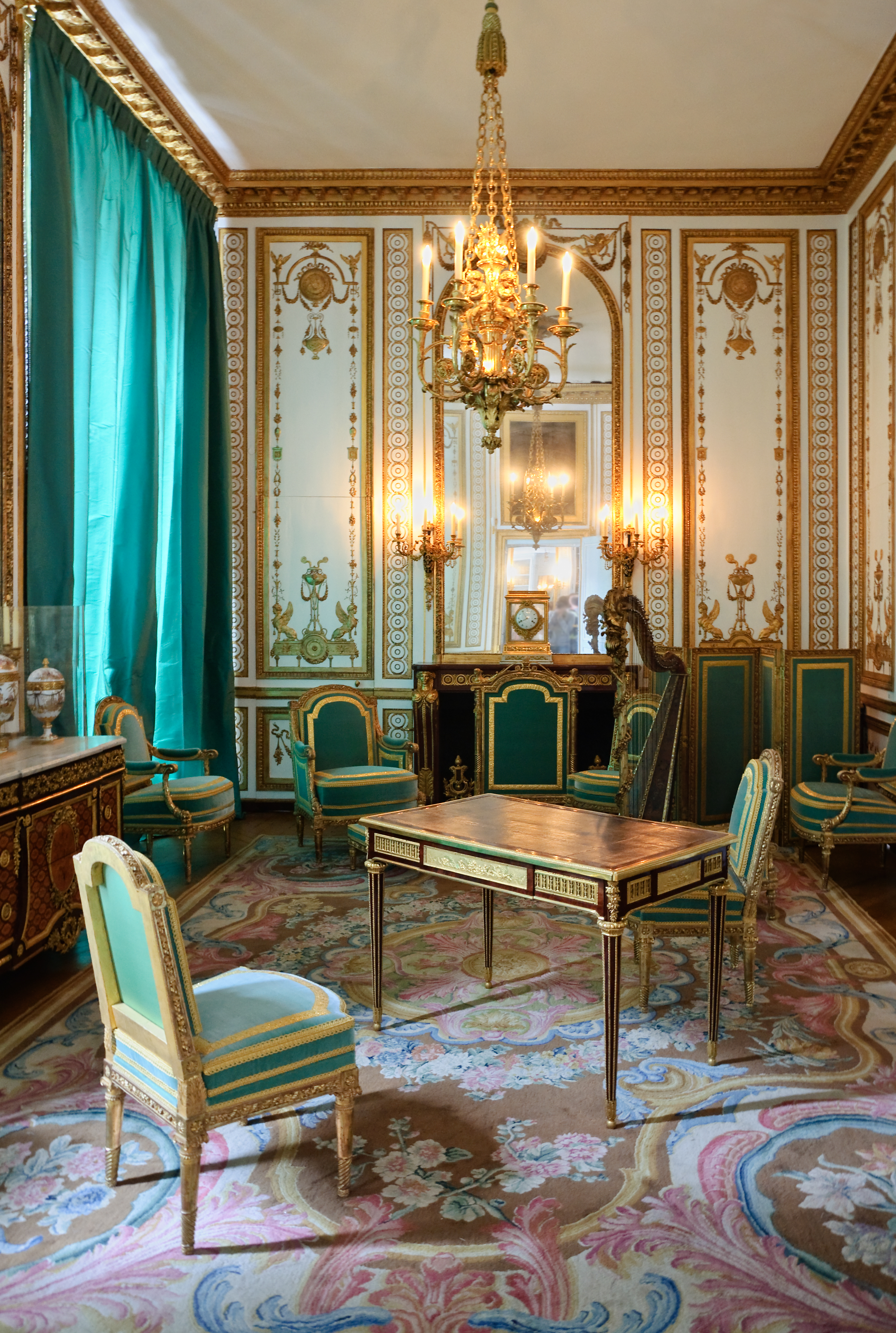
Writing table of Marie-Antoinette by Riesener (1786) in the petit appartement de la reine, Palace of Versailles.

Described as a "flat-sided rectangular table, break-fronted on all four sides, which is supported on four straight tapering legs, square in section with indented corners", Riesener's French Writing-Tables were normally extremely fine in the modelling of gilt-bronze mounts.

Table à écrire, c. 1770s, delivered to Marie-Antoinette for the Petit Trianon, Palace of Versailles, France

Writing Table, 1777, Waddesdon Manor, UK

Writing Table, 1778-1787, Waddesdon Manor, UK

Bureau, 1780–85, Louvre, France

Writing Table, 1780-85, Waddesdon Manor, UK

Writing table and filing cabinet, 1780, Waddesdon Manor, UK

Writing table, 1780, Waddesdon Manor, UK

Table à écrire, c. 1780, National Gallery of Art, United States

Bureau, 1783, Louvre, France

Table à écrire, c. 1784, delivered to Marie-Antoinette for the Tuileries Palace, National Gallery of Art, United States

=== Bureau à cylindre ===
- Bureau à cylindre (Bureau du Roi), c. 1760–69, delivered to the 'Cabinet intérieur' for Louis XV at Versailles, Palace of Versailles, France
- Bureau à cylindre, 1777-1781 , for Pierre Beaumarchais, Waddesdon Manor, UK
  "The inscription on both states that the desk was made by Jean-Henri Riesener (1734-1806) for Beaumarchais for 85,000 francs, although these claims are unproven."
- Bureau à cylindre, c. 1774, delivered to the Comte d'Orsay for the Hôtel d'Orsay, Wallace Collection, UK
- Bureau à cylindre, 1774, delivered to the comte de Provence , Waddesdon Manor, UK
- Bureau à cylindre, 1774, Woburn Abbey, UK
- Rolltop desk, 1775 , Waddesdon Manor, UK
- Bureau à cylindre, c. 1775, Royal Collection, UK
- Bureau à cylindre, c. 1775/1785, National Gallery of Art, United States
- Bureau à cylindre, 1784, delivered to Marie-Antoinette's 'Cabinet intérieur' at the palais des Tuileries, Louvre, France
- Bureau à cylindre, c. 1785, Wallace Collection, UK

=== Cabinet ===
Jewel-cabinet, delivered to the Comtesse de Provence, c. 1787, Royal Collection, UK

=== Commode ===
Commode, c. 1774, delivered to Louis XVI's "Chambre du Roi" at Versailles, Royal Collection, UK

Commode, c. 1775–80, V&A, UK

Commode, c. 1775-80, Waddesdon Manor, UK

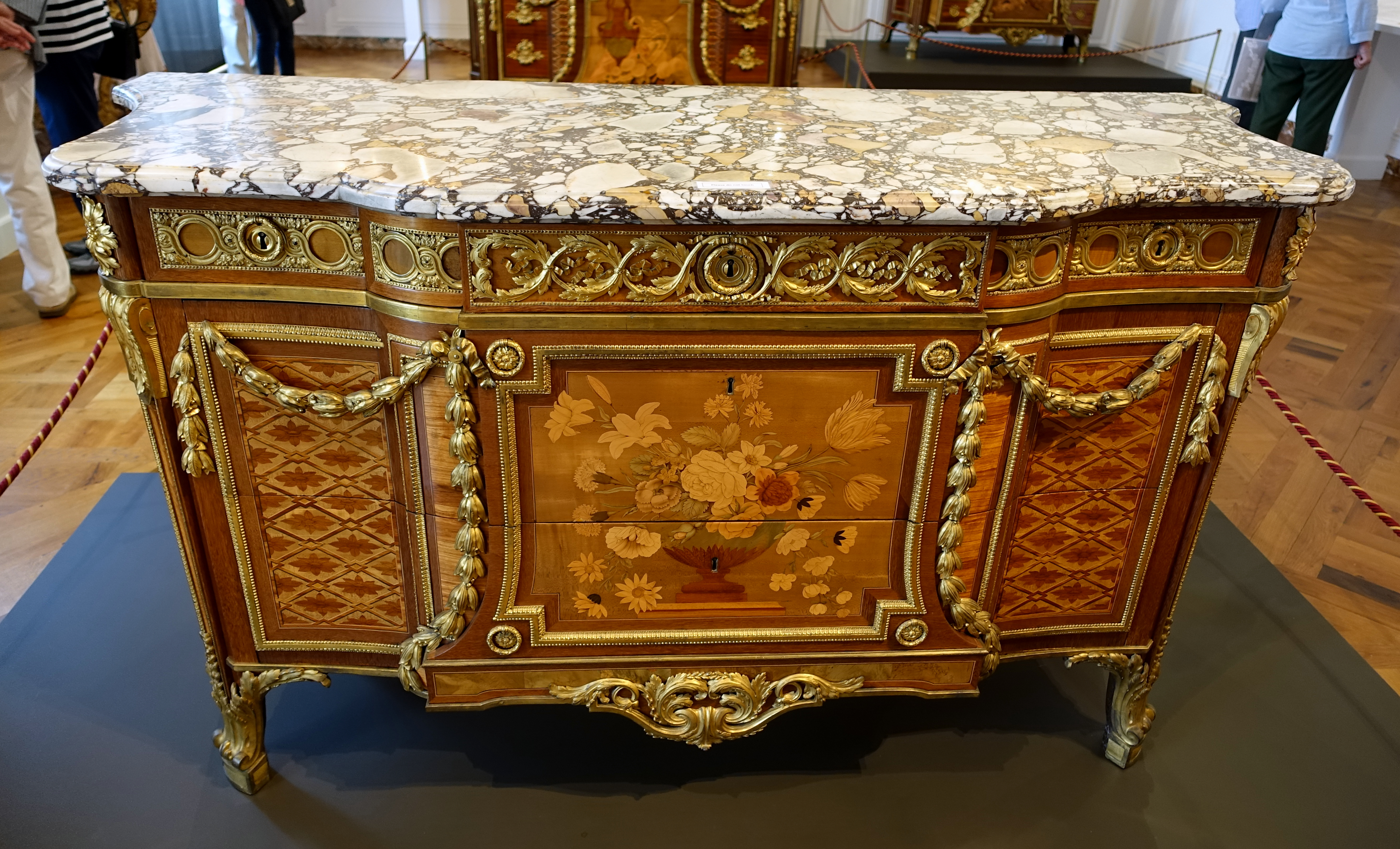
French Chest of Drawers commissioned for the Comtesse de Provence in 1776, sits in the Red Drawing Room at Waddesdon Manor.

Commode, 1776, delivered for the bedroom of the Comtesse de Provence, sister-in-law of Louis XIV, Versailles, Waddesdon Manor, UK

This chest of drawers, commissioned for "la chambre de Madame au chateau de Versailles", is described by Bellaigue (1974) as "match[ing] exactly that of the Waddesdon piece". Bellaigue continues to say "the Waddesdon chest of drawers was installed in 1776 in the comtesse de Provence's bedroom situated on the ground floor of the main block of Versailles apartments traditionally occupied by the Dauphin and Dauphine".

Commode, 1778, delivered for the King's sister, Madame Elisabeth, Versailles, Waddesdon Manor, UK

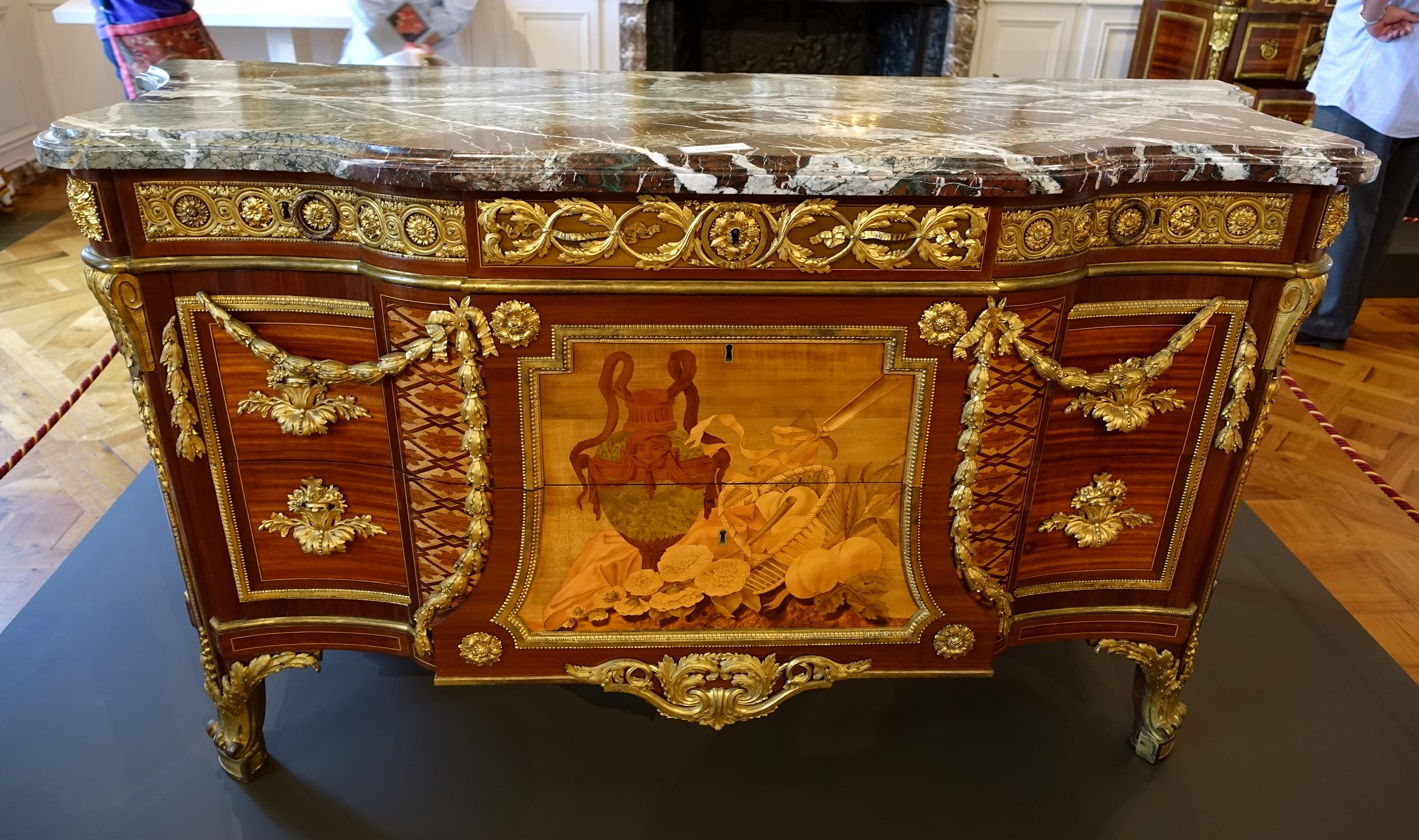
Commissioned to furnish Madame Elisabeth's new Household as a 'Daughter of France in 1778. This now sits opposite the Countess of Provence's commode in the Red Drawing Room, at Waddesdon Manor.

The carcase of this commode is of oak and veneered with purplewood and mahogany (referred to as bois satiné). The marquetry is carved from sycamore, boxwood, holly, ebony, boise satiné, casuarina wood and a burr wood. The Campan marble top reveals areas of Rouge, Rosé and Vert. Bellaigue again discusses the context around the commission of this commode, and refers to "the change in status" of Madame Elisabeth, the youngest sister of Louis XVI, when she is "formerly introduced to her new Household" on 17 May 1778. As a result, "she was installed in a new apartment on the first floor of the Aile du Midi overlooking the Orangerie and the Parterre du Midi" and furnished by Riesener "which was of a quality befitting a Daughter of France with an establishment of her own".

Commode, c. 1780, delivered to Marie-Antoinette's cabinet intérieur de la reine at Versailles, Wallace Collection, UK

Commode, c. 1782, delivered to Marie-Antoinette for Chateau de Marly, Wallace Collection, UK

Commode, 1782, delivered to Marie-Antoinette's 'Cabinet' at the Château de Marly, Louvre, France

Commode, Dalmeny House, UK

=== Encoignure ===
Paire de encoignure, delivered to Louis XVI's "Chambre du Roi" at Versailles, c. 1774, Royal Collection, UK

Encoignure, delivered to Marie-Antoinette's cabinet intérieur at Versailles, c. 1783, Wallace Collection, UK

Encoignure, supplied to Monsieur Fontanieu for his Hotel du Garde Meuble, Place Louis XV, 1773, V&A, UK

Jewel coffer et secrétaire

Jewel coffer et secrétaire, 1775–80, V&A, UK

=== Marquetry Panel ===
Panel, as part of a table-top delivered to Marie Antoinette's Petit Trianon at Versailles (Riesener's largest and finest marquetry execution), 1776, V&A, UK

=== Petit table ===
Petit table, c. 1785, Royal Collection, UK

Petit table, 1777, delivered to Marie-Antoinette for the use of Louis XVI at the Petit Trianon, Versailles, Waddesdon Manor, UK

Petit table, delivered to the 'cabinet intérieur' for Marie Antoinette at Versailles, Scone Palace, UK

=== Secrétaire ===
Secrétaire, c. 1780–4, Wallace Collection, UK

Secrétaire à abattant, delivered to Marie-Antoinette's cabinet intérieur at Versailles, c. 1780, Wallace Collection, UK

Secrétaire à abattant, delivered to Marie-Antoinette's cabinet intérieur at Versailles, c. 1783, Wallace Collection, UK

Secrétaire à abattant, delivered to Marie-Antoinette's Petit Trianon at Versailles, c. 1783, Wallace Collection, UK

Secrétaire à abattant, c. 1780–4, Wallace Collection, UK

Secrétaire à abattant, c. 1780s, Dalmeny House, UK

Secrétaire à abattant, delivered to Louis XVI's "cabinet" at the Petit Trianon, 1777, Waddesdon Manor, UK

Secrétaire à abattant, 1783, delivered (with a commode and encoignure) to the 'cabinet intérieur' for Marie Antoinette at Versailles, Metropolitan Museum of Art, United States

Secrétaire à abattant, c. 1775, Musée d'Art et d'Histoire, Switzerland

Secrétaire à abattant, called the Guerault secrétaire, c. 1770–75, (sold in Paris, 21–22 March 1935)

Secrétaire à abattant, called the Fontanieu secrétaire, c. 1771, (sold Christie's, 5 December 1974)

Secrétaire à abattant, called the Bergsten secrétaire, c. 1770–75, (sold Christie's, 23 June 1999)

Secrétaire à abattant, called the Wernher secrétaire, c. 1763–68, (sold Christie's, 5 July 2000)

=== Table de toilette ===
Table de toilette, c. 1780–4, Wallace Collection, UK

=== Toilet et bureau ===
Toilet et bureau, c. 1780–4, Wallace Collection, UK

== See also ==
- Neoclassicism in France
- Sociability and Furniture in eighteenth-century France
