= Roger Vandercruse Lacroix =

French master cabinetmaker (1728–1799)

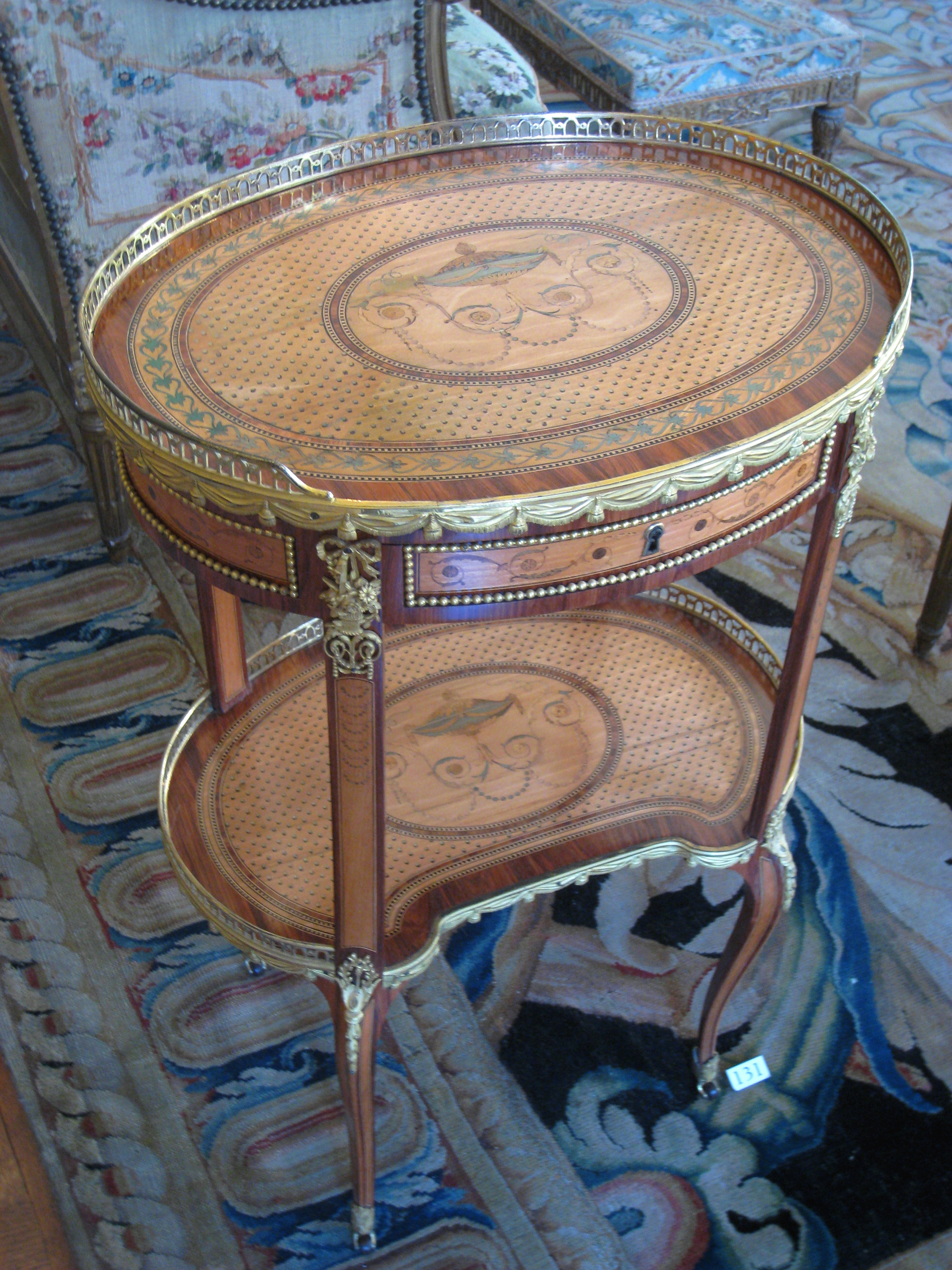
Table by Roger Vandercruse in the Musée Nissim de Camondo, Paris.

Roger Vandercruse Lacroix (1728–1799), often known as Roger Vandercruse, was a Parisian ébéniste whose highly refined furniture spans the rococo and the early neoclassical styles. According to Salverte, he "is counted among the great ebenistes of his generation (compta parmi les grands ebenistes de sa generation)."

Roger Vandercruse Lacroix, like many outstanding Parisian cabinetmakers since the mid-seventeenth century, was of Low Countries stock, fully acclimatized in Paris, where he was part of a network of outstanding craftsmen: he was the son of a cabinet-maker in the Faubourg Saint-Antoine, and the brother of a clock-maker; in 1749 his sister married Jean-François Oeben, the great ébéniste and mechanicien, whose workshop stock R.V.L.C.— as he stamped his pieces— finished after Oeben's death in 1763, including pieces designed for Oeben's patron, the marquise de Pompadour. His sister, Oeben's widow, then married the foreman Jean-Henri Riesener, royal cabinet-maker to Louis XVI.

Roger Vandercruse Lacroix took over his father's workshops in 1755, when he was received maître in the cabinet-makers' guild, the Corporation des menuisiers-ébénistes; before that, however, he had already been supplying pieces to the ébéniste Pierre Migeon: between 1751 and 1759 he supplied Migeon goods worth 21,700 livres (Eriksen 1974:224).

Roger Vandercruse excelled in the production of commodes, and specialized in meubles volants, small fine pieces that could be shifted about to suit the activities of the moment, such as the lady's writing desks called bonheurs du jour and small tables.

A good deal of R.V.L.C.'s work seems to have been for Parisian marchands-merciers, who would supply him with designs and Chinese lacquer screens, to be cut up and applied in lieu of marquetry panels. For such decorator-dealers as Simon-Philippe Poirier he provided furniture mounted with Sèvres porcelain plaques, a luxury decor that Poirier had invented. A mechanical table with a nest of drawers that rise from the top on release of a spring bears R.V.L.C.'s stamp and Poirier's name written in a drawer. R.V.L.C. often used marquetry designs and gilt-bronze mounts very similar to those used by his brother-in-law Oeben (Eriksen 1974:224)

He even habitually supplied work that was delivered by the ageing ébéniste du Roi Gilles Joubert: the R.V.L.C. stamp appears on a commode in conservative neoclassical taste, with pictorial marquetry of vases and trophies of the arts, that was delivered in 1769 by Joubert for Madame Victoire at Château de Compiègne, on a commode for the comtesse de Provence at Fontainbleau in 1771, and on one of a pair of commodes delivered by Joubert for the Salon de Compagnie of Mme du Barry there in 1772

R.V.L.C. held several important positions in the Parisian cabinet-makers' guild, the Corporation des menuisiers-ébénistes, before retiring from business at the disruption of his clientele by the French Revolution and died in 1799.

Pieces by R.V.L.C. figure in all the national collections of decorative arts, and qusi-national ones like that at Waddesdon Manor, or the Musée Nissim de Camondo, Paris, and in numerous private collections.
