= Bureau du Roi =

Ornamented royal cylinder desk

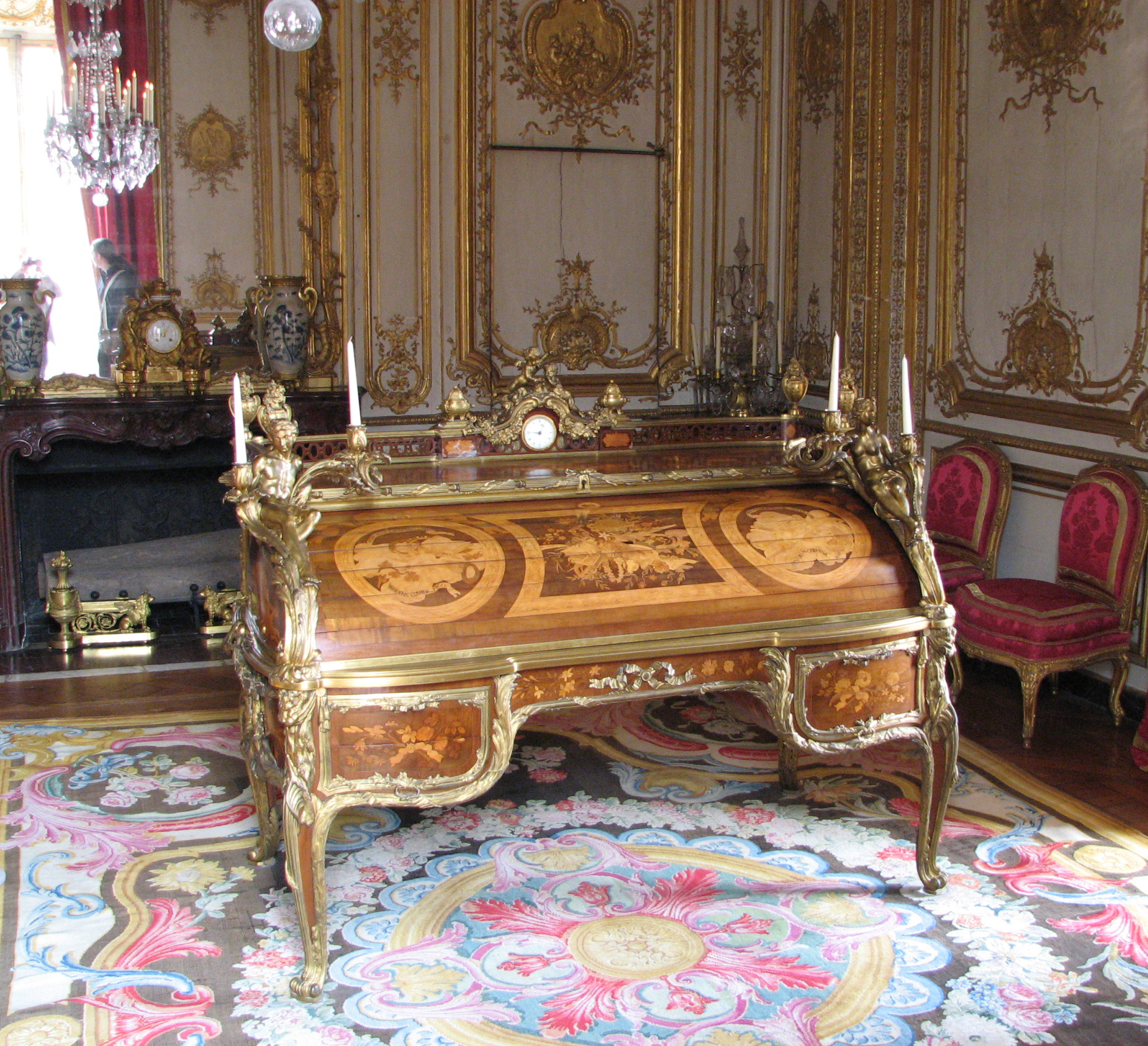
- Material: Bronze, marquetry of a variety of fine woods, Sèvres porcelain
- Size: 147.3 x 192.5 x 105
- Created: 1760–1769
- Present location: Palace of Versailles, Versailles, France

The Bureau du Roi (French pronunciation: [byʁo dy ʁwa], 'the King's desk'), also known as Louis XV's roll-top desk (French: Secrétaire à cylindre de Louis XV), is the richly ornamented royal cylinder desk which was constructed at the end of Louis XV's reign, and is now again in the Palace of Versailles.

== History ==
The Bureau du Roi was probably started in 1760, when the commission was formally announced. Its first designer was Jean-François Oeben, the master cabinet maker of the royal arsenal. The first step in its construction was the fabrication of an extremely detailed miniature model in wax. The full-scale desk was finished in 1769 by his successor, Jean Henri Riesener, who had married Oeben's widow.

Made for the new Cabinet du Roi at the Palace of Versailles, it was transferred to the Louvre Museum in Paris after the French Revolution, but has been returned to the Palace of Versailles in the 20th century where it stands again in the room where it was standing before the Revolution: the Cabinet intérieur du Petit Appartement ('Inner study of the Private Apartments'), the famous study room where kings Louis XV and Louis XVI carried out their daily work, and where King Louis XVI decided to support the American insurgents in 1777. Secret diplomatic papers were kept inside the desk's secret drawers, whose only key the king always carried with him.

== Description ==
The desk is covered with intricate marquetry of a wide variety of fine woods. In an oval reserve at the center of its "public" side, away from the king himself, is the marquetry head of "Silence", with forefinger to lips, a reminder of the discretion required in the king's business. Gilt-bronze moldings of plaques, statuettes, miniature busts and vases, even integral scrolling gilt-bronze candle stands, further adorn the surfaces of the desk. The original design was to have a miniature bust of Louis XV on top, but it was replaced by Minerva after his death in 1770.

Riesener later executed a simplified second version of the Bureau du Roi for Pierre Gaspard Marie Grimod d'Orsay, comte d'Orsay; today this may be seen in the Wallace Collection in London. His copy was the first of a number of replicas that were produced from the 1870s onwards by leading cabinetmakers in Paris, including four examples by François Linke.

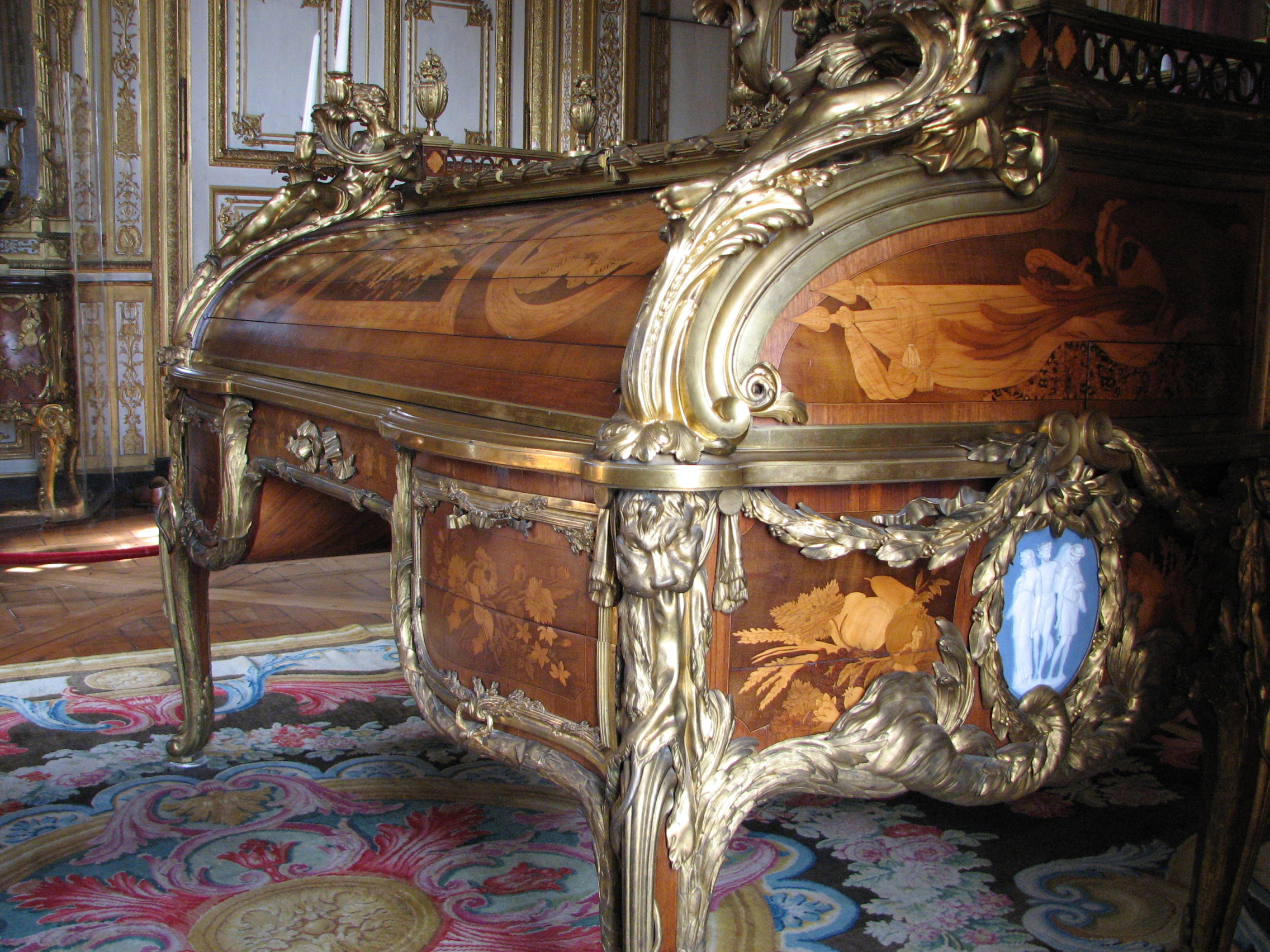
Side view

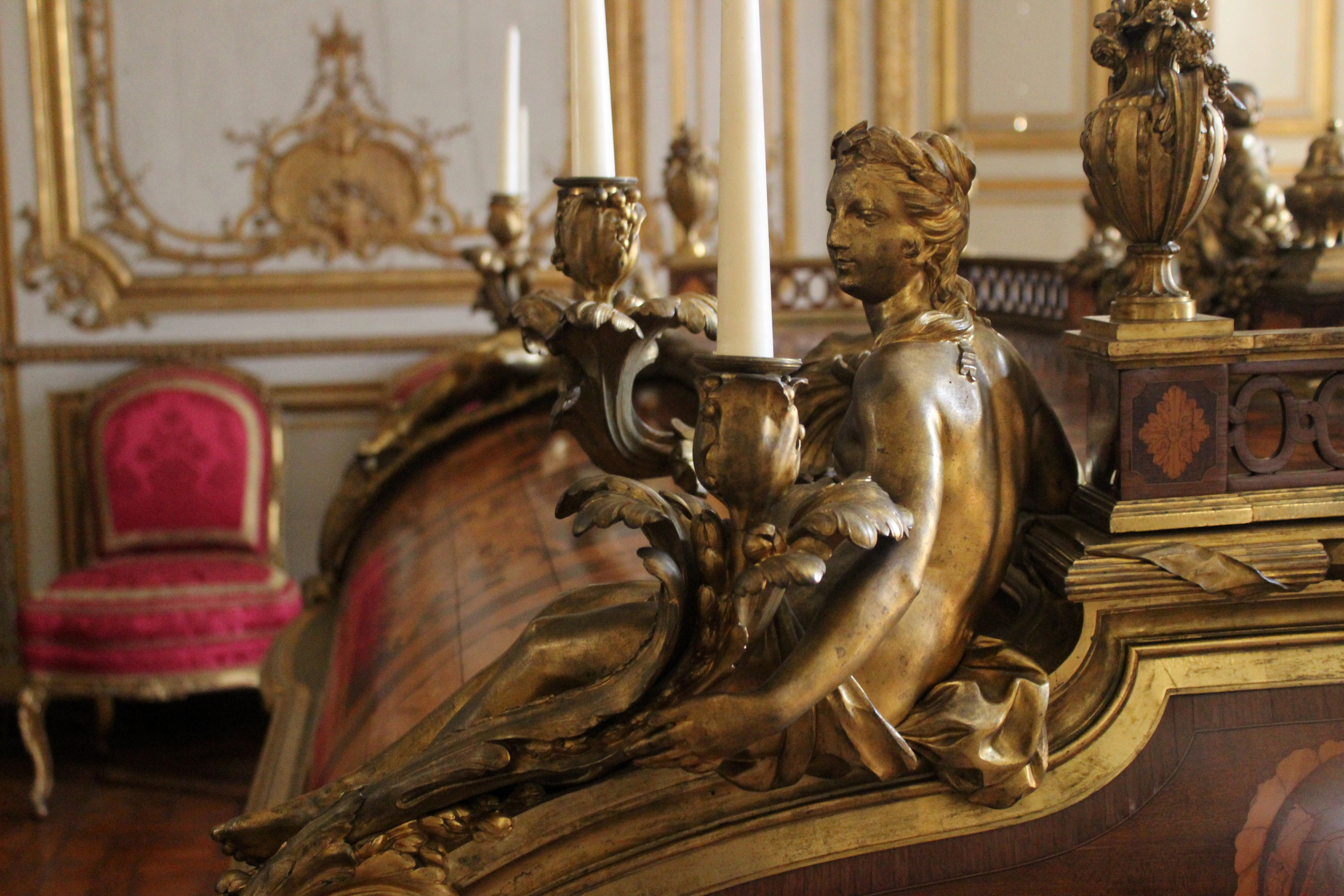
Candleholder

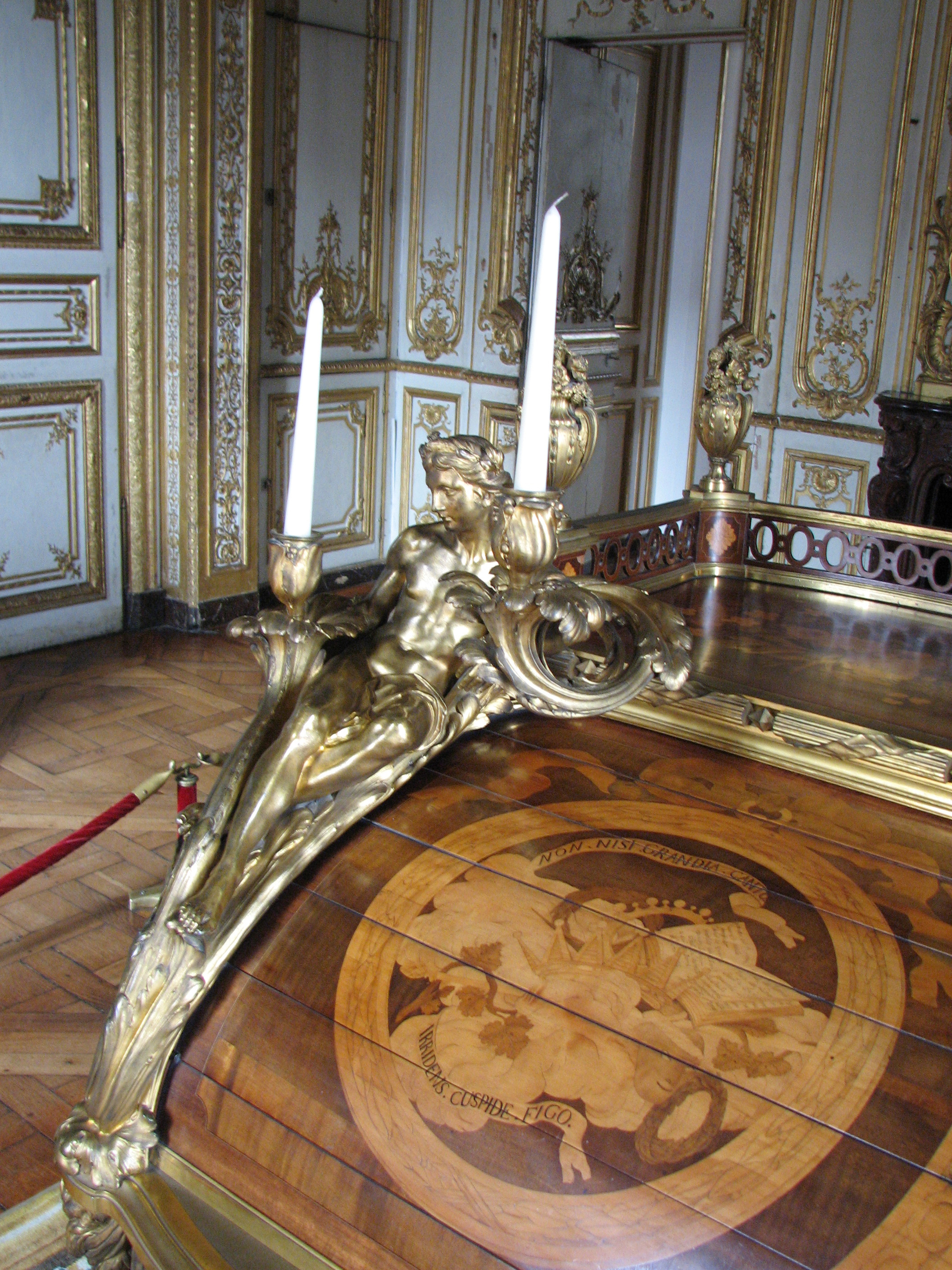
Detail

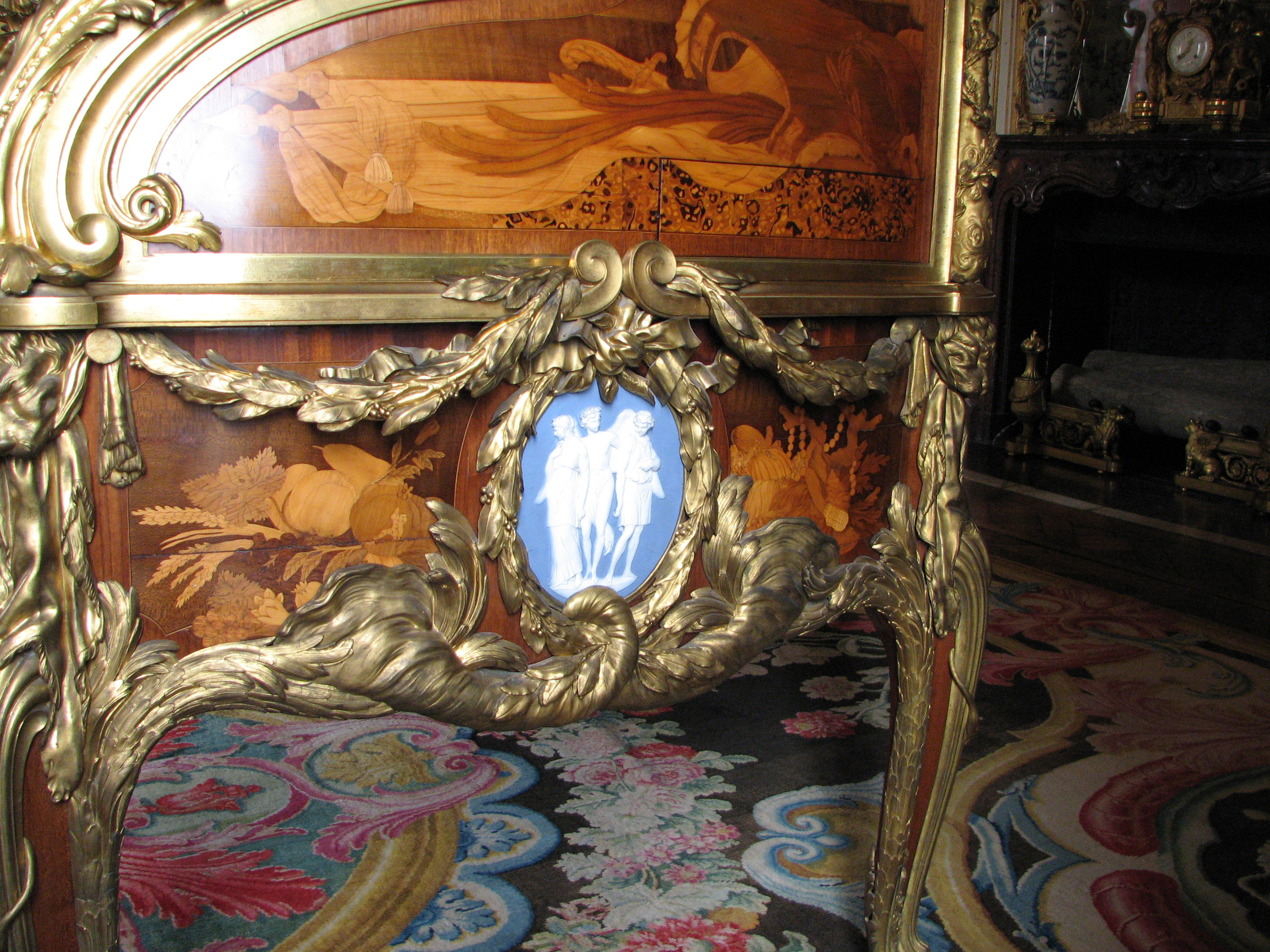
Detail, side

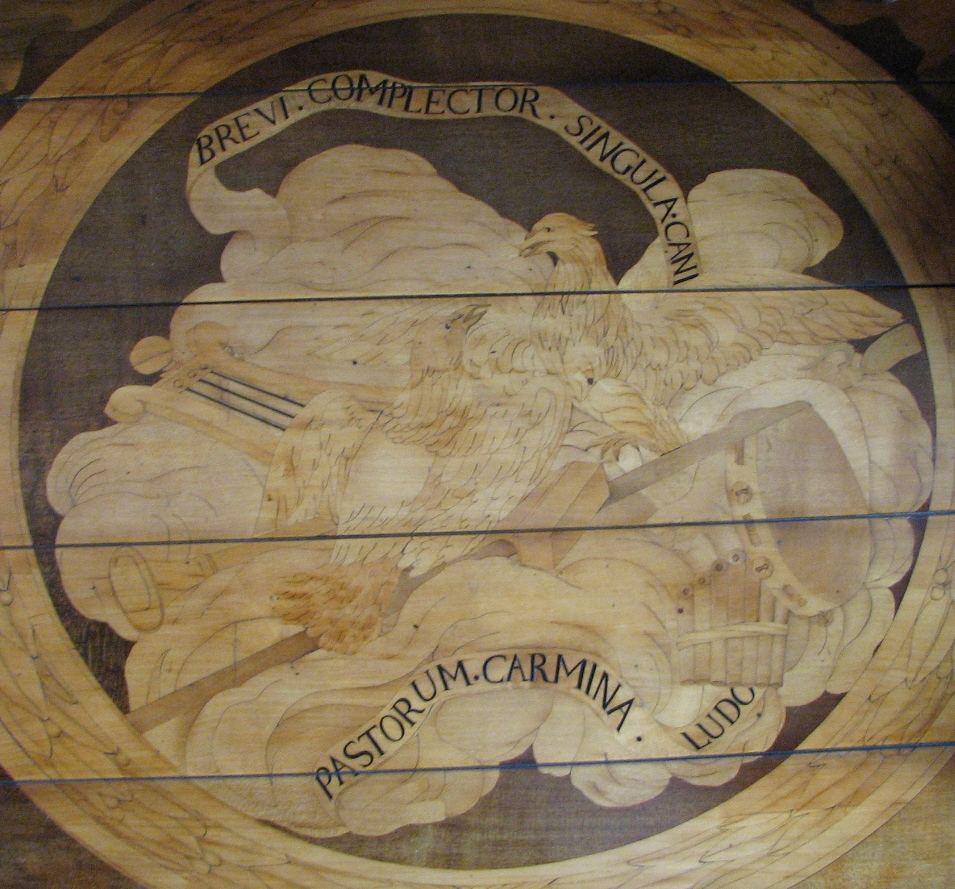
Marquetry medallion

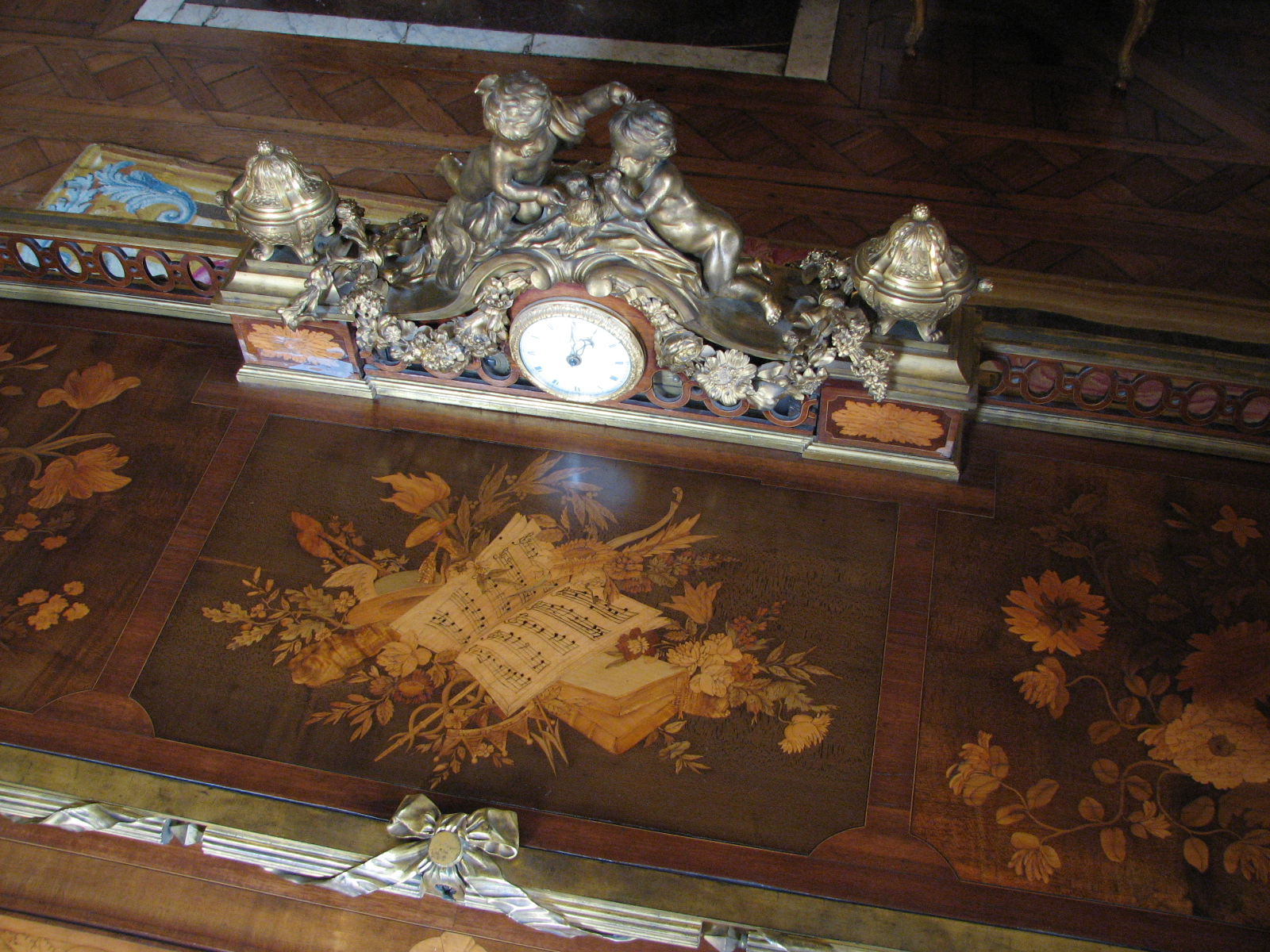
Top

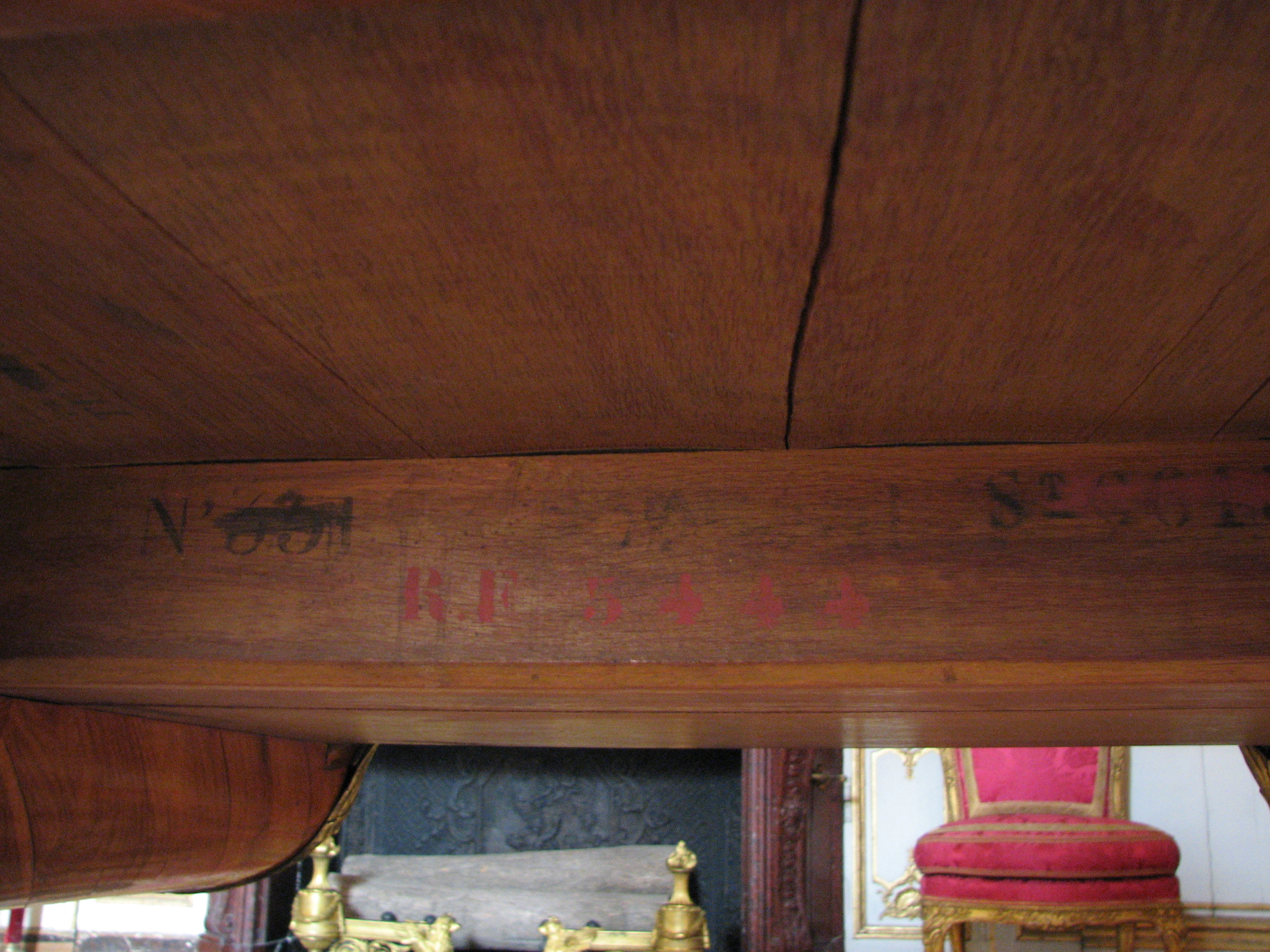
Underside

== Bibliography ==
- Brunhammer, Yvonne; Monique de Fayet. Meubles et ensembles, époque Louis XVI. Paris, Éditions Charles Massin, 1965. Pages 59, 60, 61, 65.
- Grande encyclopédie illustrée des meubles. Paris: Flammarion, 1980. Page 118.
- Histoire du mobilier. Paris: Editions Atlas, 1979. Pages 105, 106, 107, 144.

== See also ==
- Henry VIII's writing desk
- List of desk forms and types
- Resolute desk
