= Jean-François Oeben =

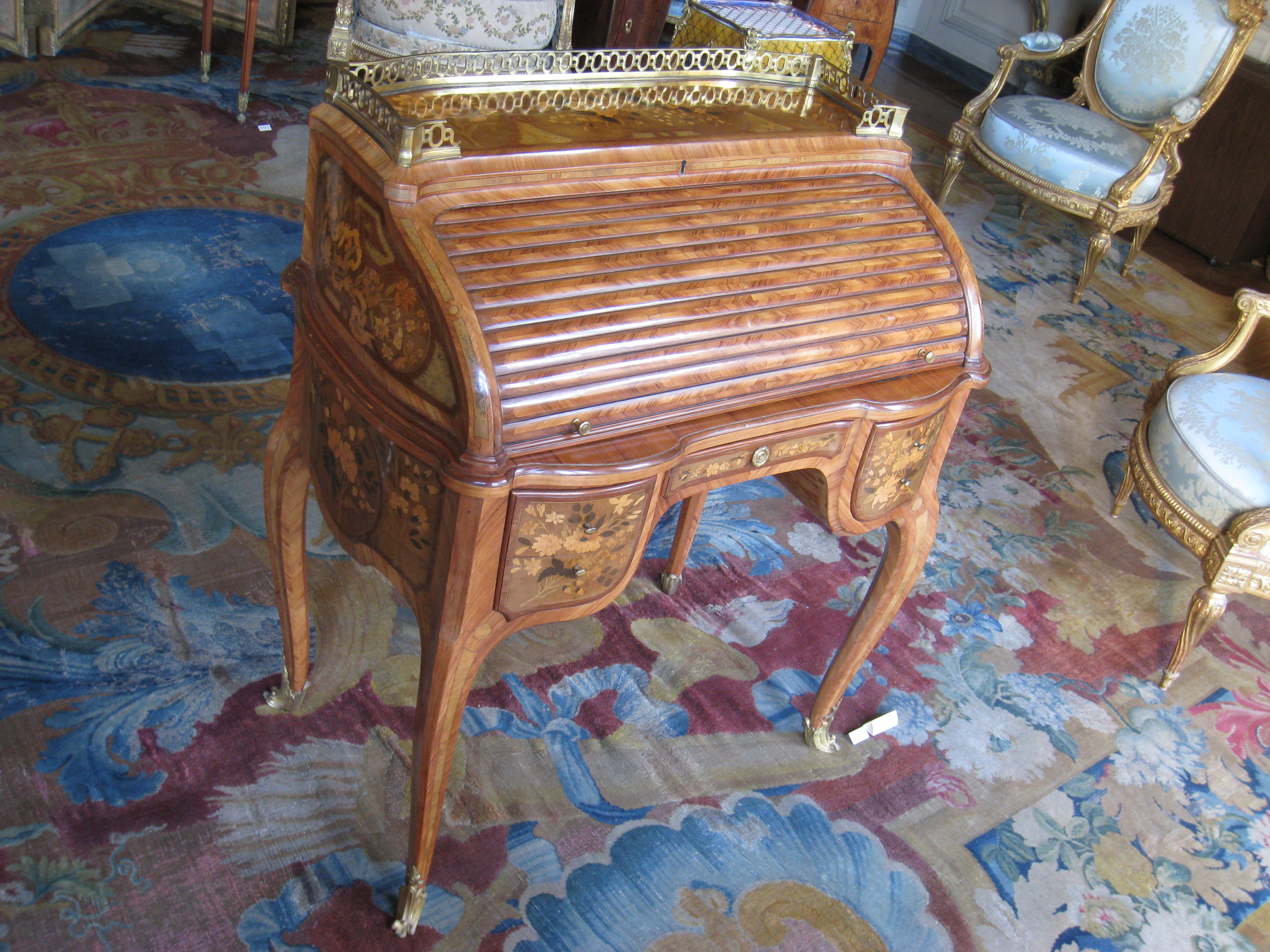
- Secrétaire à cylindre by Jean-François Oeben
- Born: 9 October 1721; Heinsberg, Duchy of Jülich
- Died: 21 January 1763 (aged 41); Paris, Kingdom of France
- Wife: Françoise-Marguerite Vandercruse
- Issue: Victoire Delacroix (née Oeben)

Jean-François Oeben, or Johann Franz Oeben (9 October 1721 – 21 January 1763) was a German ébéniste (cabinetmaker) whose career was spent in Paris. He was the maternal grandfather of the painter Eugène Delacroix.

== Life and career ==
Nothing is securely known about his training. He was in Paris by about 1740; from 1749 he lived in the Faubourg Saint-Antoine.

During 1751 – 1754 he worked as compagnon at the workshop of Charles-Joseph Boulle, son of the great ébeniste of Louis XIV, André Charles Boulle, and then independently in premises in the Galleries of the Louvre sublet to him by Boulle. From 1754 he was granted premises, at first at the Manufacture des Gobelins, then, in 1756, in workshops and lodgings at the Arsenal.

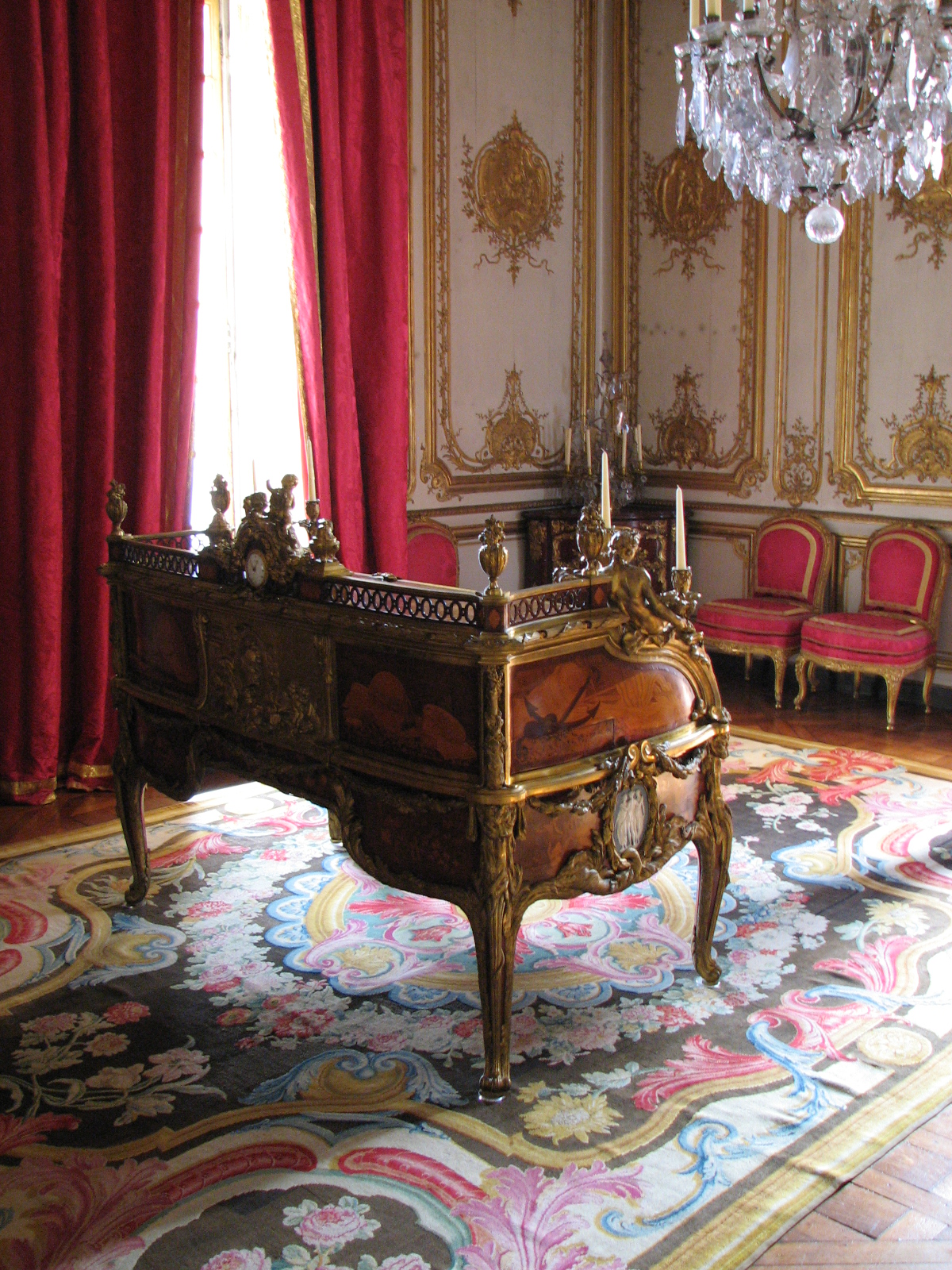
The Bureau du Roi, from 1760; completed by Jean-Henri Riesener

Though he had workshops under royal appointment, throughout his career the royal cabinet-maker, ébeniste du Roi, was Gilles Joubert. Oeben worked for the aristocracy sometimes through intermediary marchands-merciers, providing extremely refined case furniture with marquetry of flowers that gave way, in the last years of his career, to sober geometrical tiled patterns.

Oeben worked extensively for Madame de Pompadour: in the inventory drawn up after his death there were ten items awaiting delivery to her. She had ordered many pieces of furniture from him in 1761, doubtless for the Château de Bellevue, and had already paid 17,400 livres on account. In the inventory after her death, there were sixteen commodes "à la Grecque" that must have come from Oeben, who was in the forefront of this first phase of neoclassical style; in the announcement advertising the sale of his stock after his death, it was explicitly stated that all was "in a new style" (Eriksen 1974:208). Not all of the furnishings for Mme de Pompadour had abandoned the rococo manner: at the Metropolitan Museum of Art, a mechanical table stamped by Oeben and his brother-in-law R.V.L.C. has pierced cabriole legs, for an unusual effect of lightness and grace. Its mounts bear Pompadour's armorial bearing, a tower, and R.V.L.C.'s stamp shows that it was one of the pieces in the workshop that was left unfinished at the time of Oeben's death, completed and stamped by Roger Vandercruse.

Oeben's distinguished marquetry appears at its most ambitious on the famous, minutely-documented roll-top Bureau du Roi, made for Louis XV, which was begun in 1760 and remained unfinished at his death; it was finished and delivered in 1769, signed by Jean Henri Riesener, but it was Oeben who devised its intricate mechanisms.

The known work of Oeben possesses genuine grace and beauty; as craftsmanship it is of the first rank, and it is typically French in its fluent, idiomatic character. His furniture is found in all the great national collections of decorative arts. The Calouste Gulbenkian Museum has a mechanical table made by Oeben for the comte d'Argenson which opens swing-away secretarial writing surfaces and a tilted reading easel with successive turns of a single key. At the J. Paul Getty Museum is a commode of ca. 1760 stamped by Oeben veneered in parquetry and reflecting the "new style" especially in its gilt-bronze mounts; it is fitted with an elaborate locking mechanism typical of Oeben. He is represented in the Victoria and Albert Museum by a pair of inlaid corner-cupboards. These, with a bureau and a chiffonier in the French national Garde Meuble, in which bouquets of flowers are delicately inlaid in choice woods, are his best-known and most admirable achievements.

== Family ==
On 29 June 1749 Jean-François married Françoise-Marguerite Vandercruse, the daughter of the ébeniste François Vandercruse called Lacroix, and so was the brother-in-law of another outstanding cabinet-maker, Roger Vandercruse Lacroix. Françoise-Marguerite bore daughter Victoire to Jean-François, and Victoire bore painter Eugène Delacroix.

Jean-François has sometimes been confused with his brother Simon-François Oeben (ca. 1725, Heinsberg – 1786, Paris), his employee since 1754, who married the other Vandercruse sister. Their sister Marie-Catherine married the ébeniste Martin Carlin in 1759.

His widow married his journeyman Jean Henri Riesener, who used Oeben's stamp until he was granted its mastership in 1768.

== See also ==
- Neoclassicism in France
