= Maurice Baquoy =

French engraver (c. 1680 – 1747)

Maurice Baquoy, a French engraver, was born about 1680, and worked in Paris from 1710 to 1740. He engraved a set of vignettes for the Histoire de France by Gabriel Daniel, from the designs of François Boucher. He also produced a set of landscapes and views, and a naval combat, after P. D. Martin, the younger — one of the four large battle-pieces after Martin engraved at Paris for the Czar, Peter the Great. Baquoy died in 1747.
