= Rococo =

Artistic style in Europe and colonies, c. 1730–1780

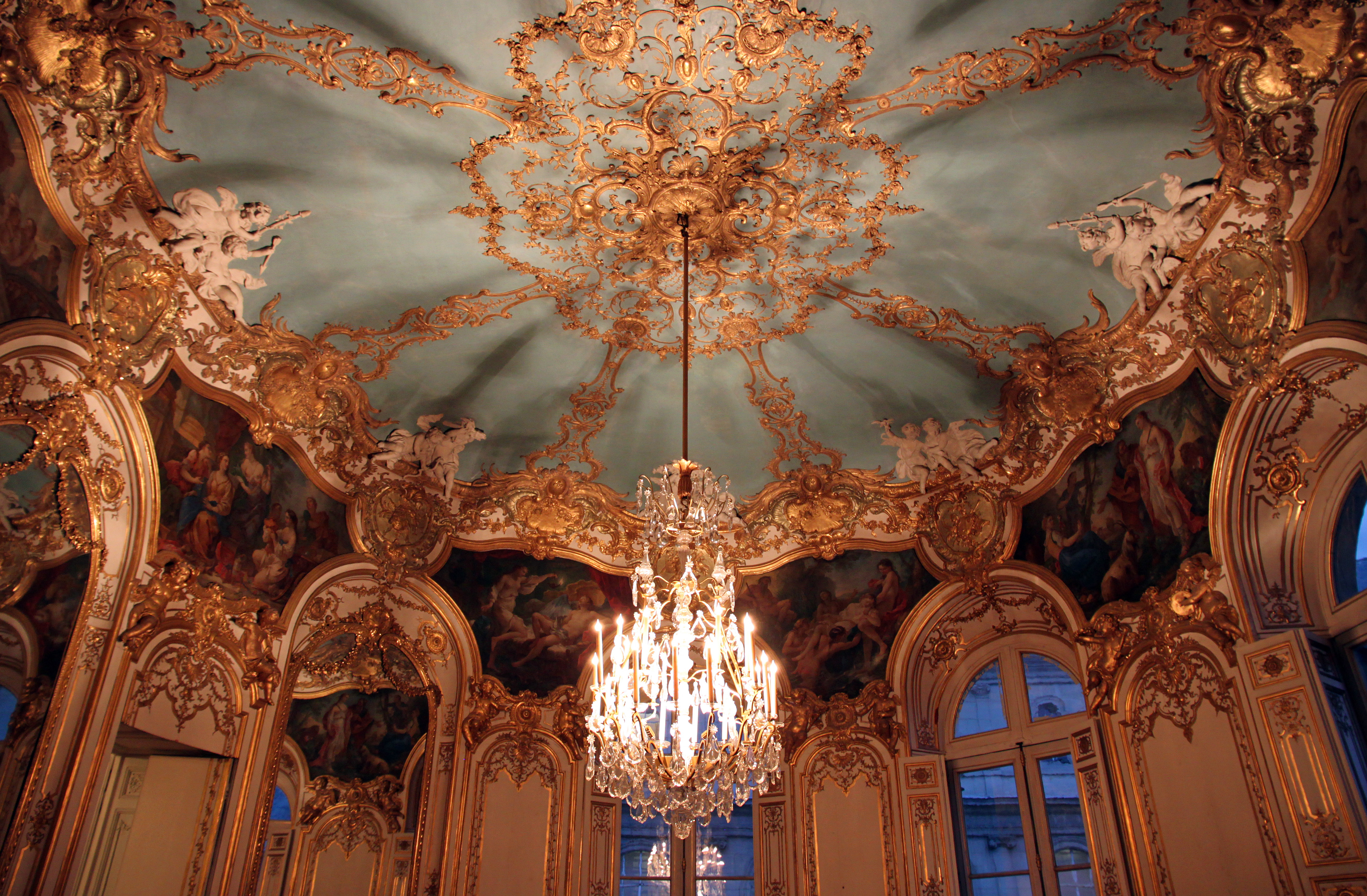
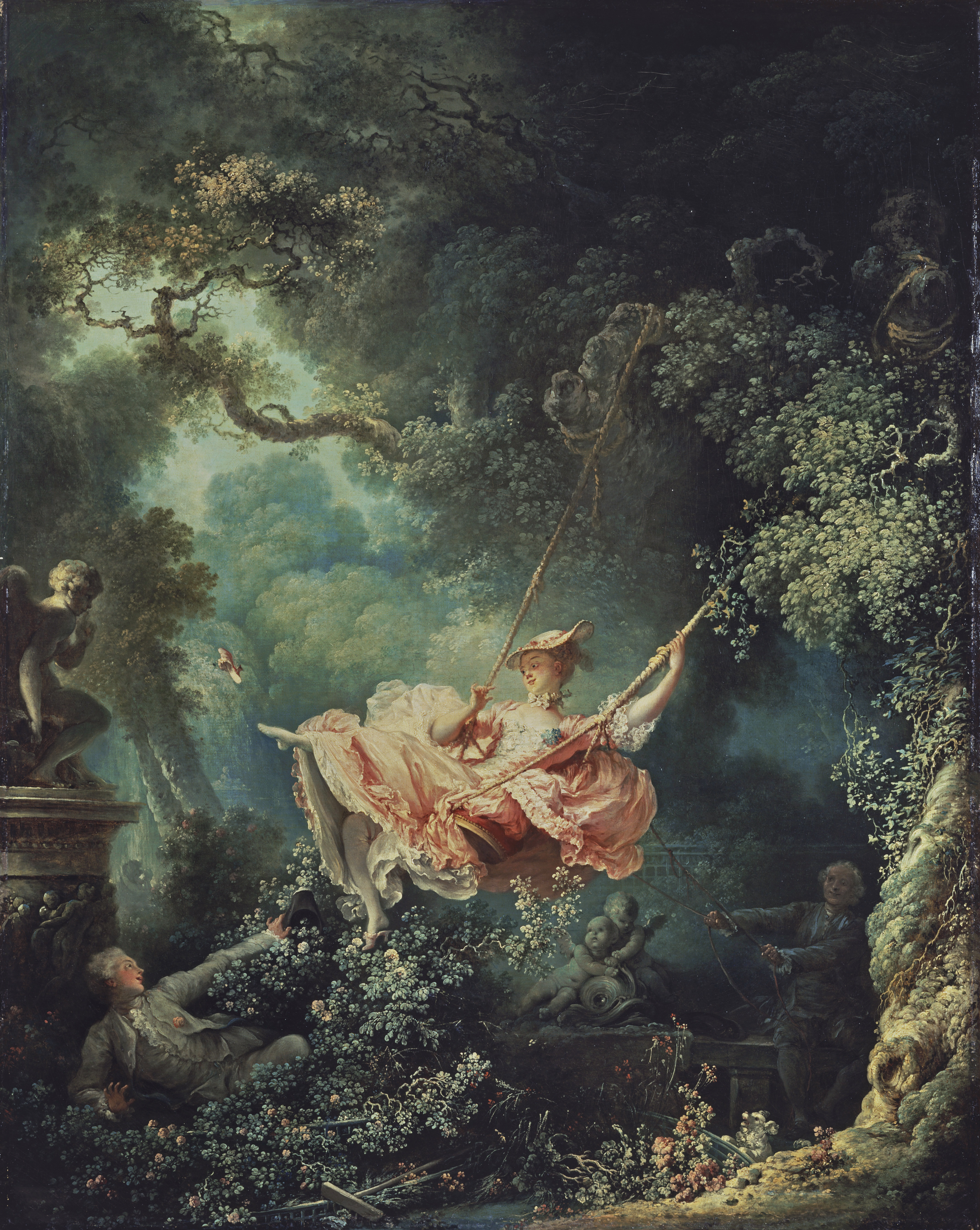
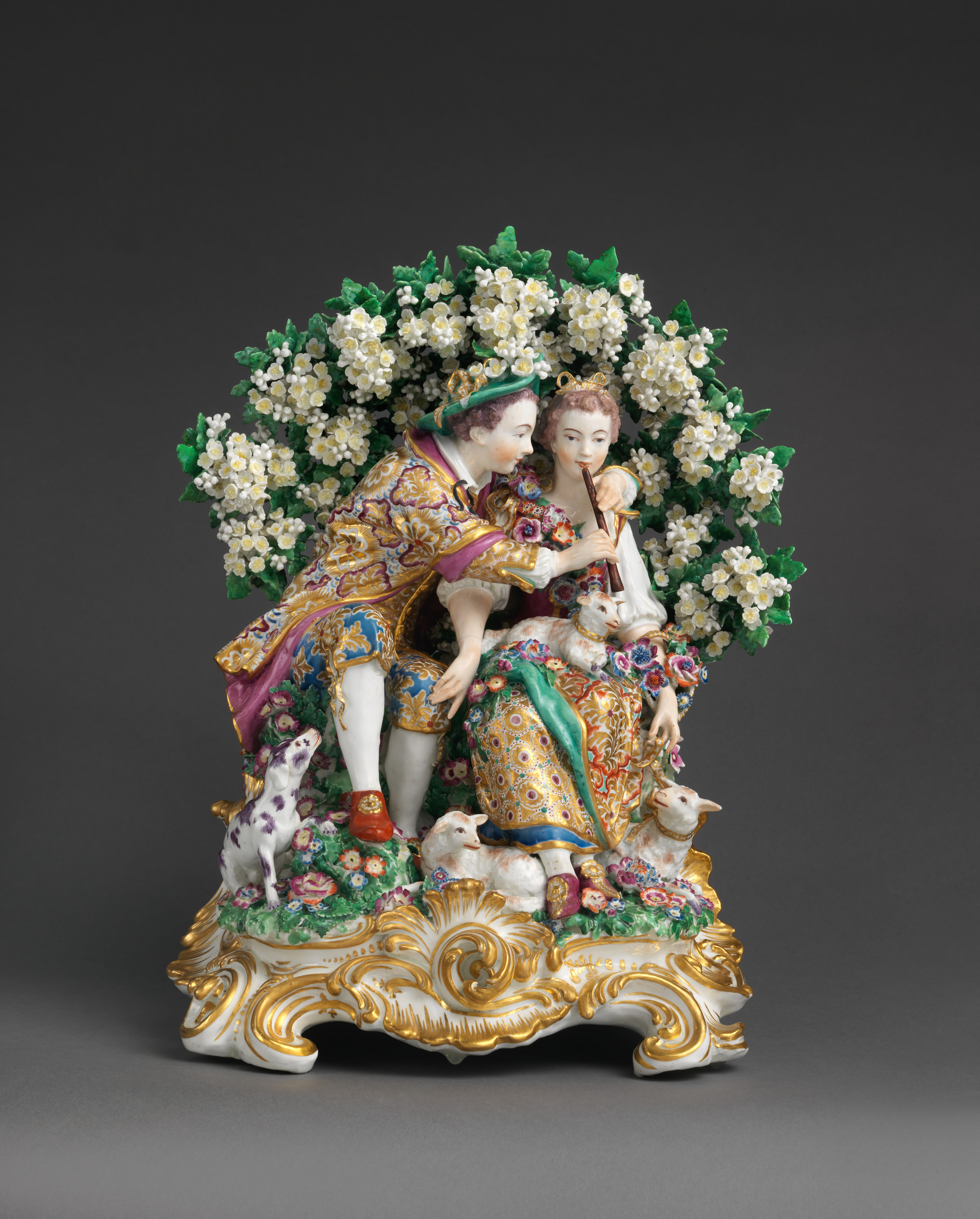
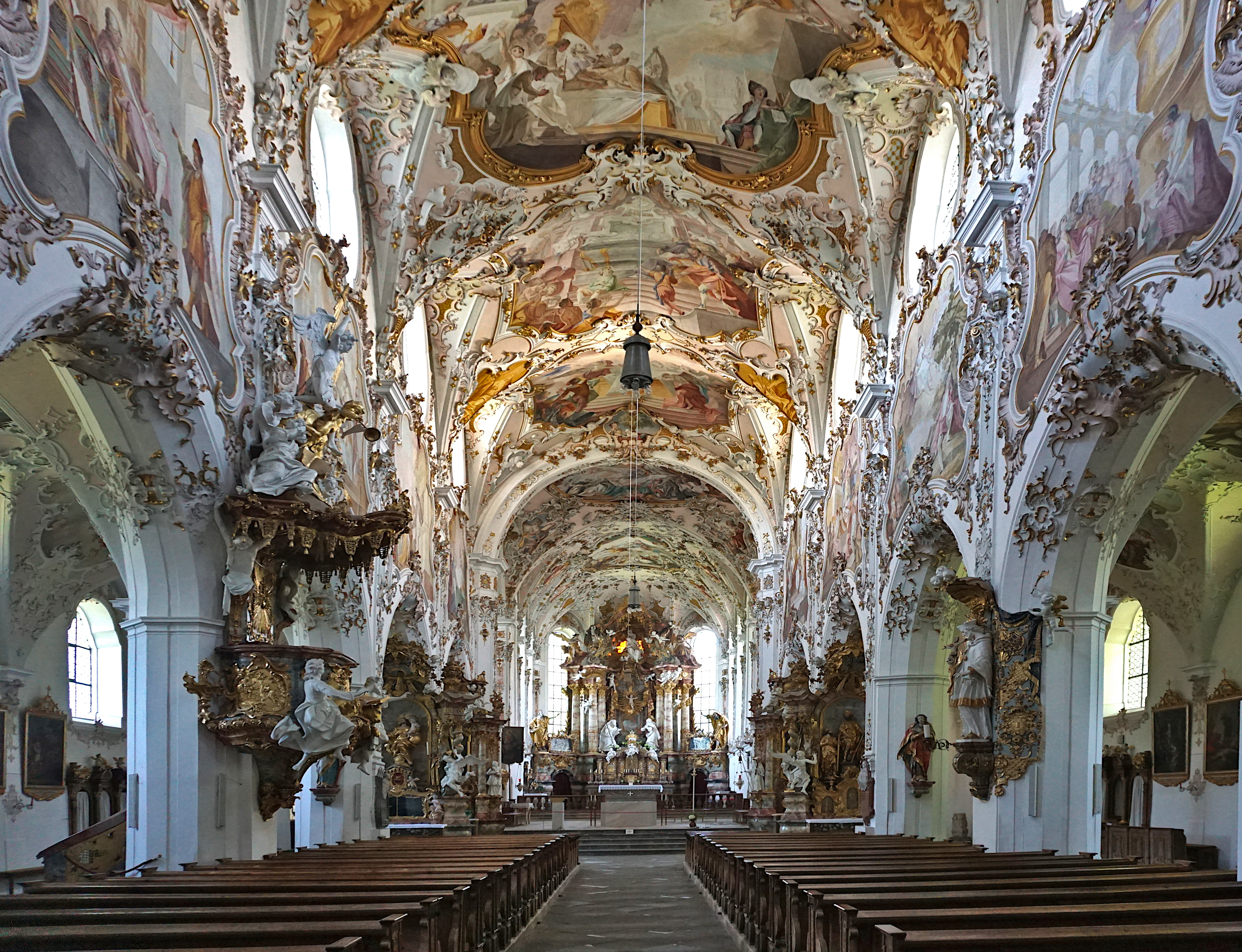
- Top: Ceiling vault of the Salon de la Princesse at the Hôtel de Soubise, Paris (1735–1740); Middle left: The Swing by Jean-Honoré Fragonard (1767); Middle right: The Music Lesson, Chelsea porcelain (c. 1765); Bottom: Interior of the Pfarrkirche Mariä Geburt at Rottenbuch Abbey, Bavaria (1737–1746)

Additional media
- Branch: Architecture, decorative arts, interior design, painting, sculpture, music, theatre, literature, fashion
- Years active: c. 1730s – 1780s
- Location: Originated in Paris, spreading across Europe (especially Central Europe and Italy) and South America
- Major figures: Jean-Antoine Watteau, François Boucher, Jean-Honoré Fragonard, Giovanni Battista Tiepolo, Johann Balthasar Neumann, Juste-Aurèle Meissonnier
- Influences: Baroque
- Influenced: Rococo Revival, Art Nouveau

Rococo, less commonly Roccoco (/rəˈkoʊkoʊ/ rə-KOH-koh, US also /ˌroʊkəˈkoʊ/ ROH-kə-KOH; French: [ʁɔkɔko], also [ʁokoko]), is a Western style of architecture, art, and decoration that emerged in France in the 1730s as a reaction against the Louis XIV style. It is characterized by extensive ornamentation, fluid curves, asymmetry, and a smaller scale designed to foster intimacy. It employs rocaille (shell- and pebble-like motifs) and often blends white and pastel colours with gilding and sculpted moulding, using trompe-l'œil frescoes to create spatial illusion. In the visual arts, prevalent themes are aristocratic leisure and the pastoral, depicted in stage-like settings. It is often regarded as the final expression of the Baroque movement and is sometimes called Late Baroque.

Originally known as style rocaille 'rock-work style', Rococo spread from French domestic interiors to other parts of Europe, particularly northern Italy, Austria, southern Germany, broader Central Europe, and Russia. It also influenced painting, sculpture, furniture, silverware, glassware, music, theatre, and literature. It was later adapted for church architecture and became widespread in this form, particularly in Central Europe, Portugal, and South America. By the late 18th century, Rococo was largely replaced by Neoclassicism.

== Etymology ==
The word rococo is a satirical derivation of the French word rocaille, coined by the Neoclassical painter Pierre-Maurice Quays (1777–1803). Historically, rocaille referred to a method of decorating grottoes and artificial fountains with pebbles, seashells, and cement, used since the Renaissance. During the late 17th and early 18th centuries, the term came to describe a decorative motif of interlaced seashells and acanthus leaves that emerged in the late Louis XIV style. In 1736, the designer and jeweller Jean Mondon published Premier Livre de forme rocquaille et cartel (First Book of Rocaille and Cartel Form), a collection of designs for furniture and interiors. This publication was the first time rocaille appeared in print to describe the style. Artisans consequently integrated carved or moulded shell motifs with palm fronds or sinuous vines to embellish doorways, wall panelling, furnishings, and other architectural elements.

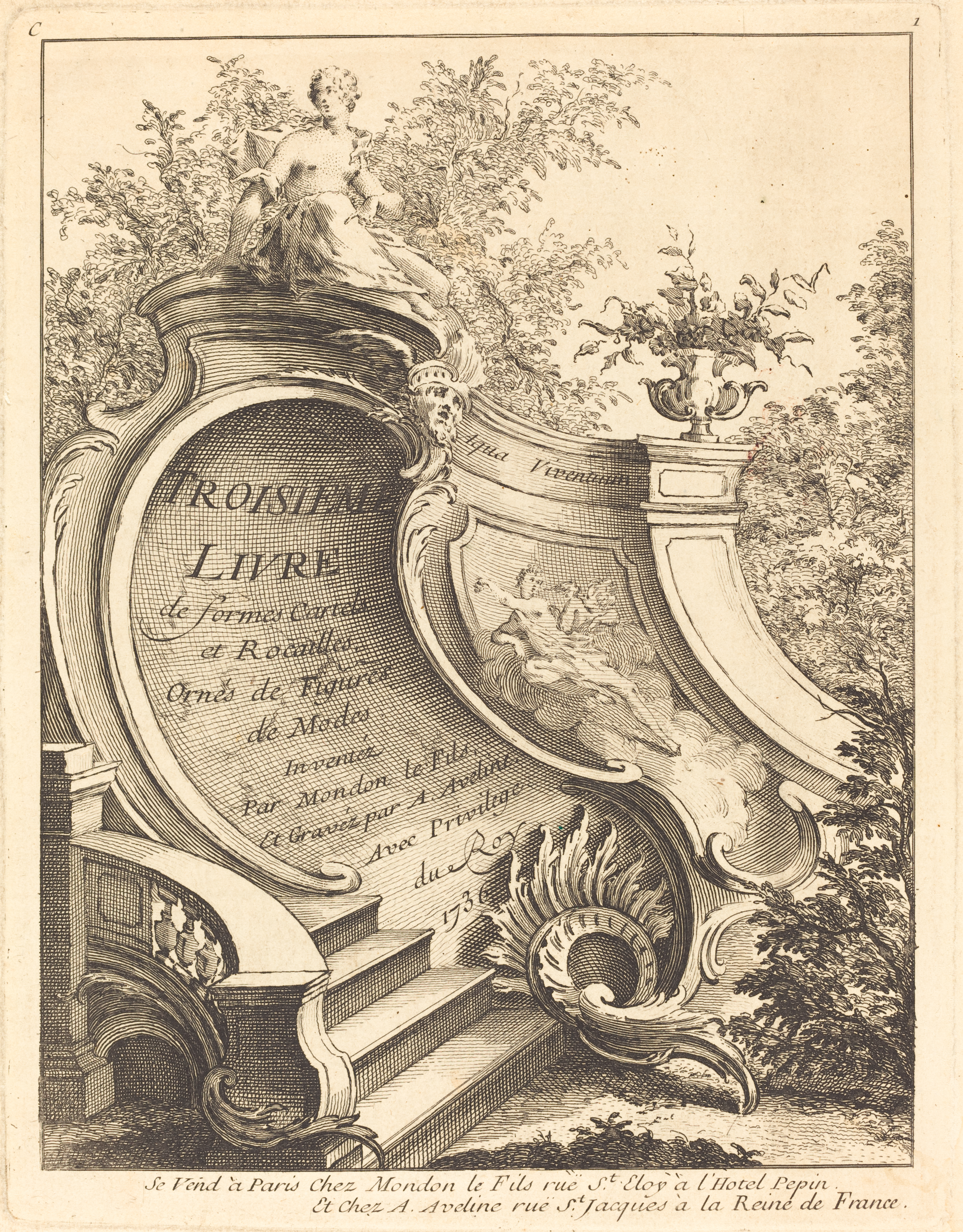
The title page from Jean Mondon's 1736 publication of rocaille designs, engraved by Antoine Aveline. This series marked the first time the word rocaille appeared in print to describe an aesthetic style.

The word rococo first appeared in print in 1825, used by critics as a pejorative term for decoration deemed "out of style and old-fashioned". By 1828, it described decorations "which belonged to the style of the 18th century, overloaded with twisting ornaments". In 1829, the author Stendhal defined rococo as "the rocaille style of the 18th century", signalling a shift toward a more objective historical description.

Throughout the 19th century, it was often used dismissively for architecture or music characterized by heavy ornamentation. By the mid-19th century, art historians widely accepted the term. Today, art historians recognize Rococo as a distinct period in European art.

== Characteristics ==
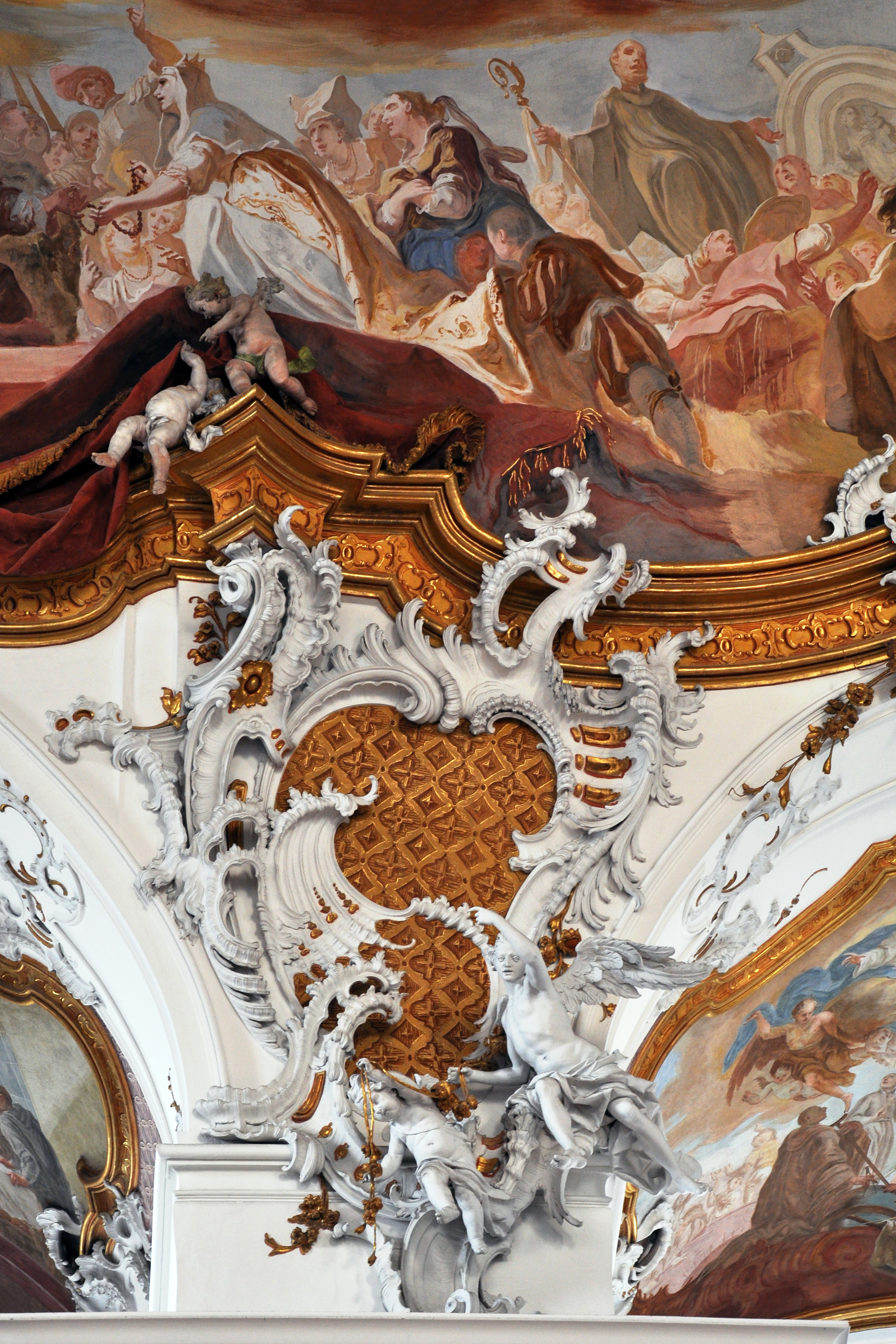
Detail of the ceiling at Zwiefalten Abbey, Germany (1739–1745), showing the Rococo synthesis of illusionistic fresco, gilded architecture, and moulded stucco

Rococo ornamentation relies on curves, counter-curves, undulating forms, and motifs from nature. Buildings often feature simple exteriors to contrast with heavily decorated interiors designed to surprise the viewer. Church floor plans use interlocking ovals to create complex interior spaces. In palaces, large staircases serve as central focal points that offer multiple views of the decorations. Rooms often feature boiserie (carved wood panelling) and mirrors placed above fireplaces or opposite windows to reflect natural light. Common motifs include rocaille, acanthus and foliate scrolls, birds, flowers, fruits, musical instruments, and putti. Rococo also includes chinoiserie, with stylized pagodas, dragons, exotic flowers, idealized East Asian figures, and singerie (depictions of monkeys).

In contrast with the Baroque period, Rococo replaces bilateral symmetry and heavy forms with lighter, asymmetrical designs. Instead of bold, high-contrast chiaroscuro, Rococo uses pastel colours such as soft yellows, creams, pearl greys, and pale blues. In spatial organization, the focus shifts from grand public spaces to private rooms. Large state galleries are often divided into smaller apartments. Furniture is scaled down to suit these spaces and designed to match the carved wall panelling, creating a unified interior known as en suite.

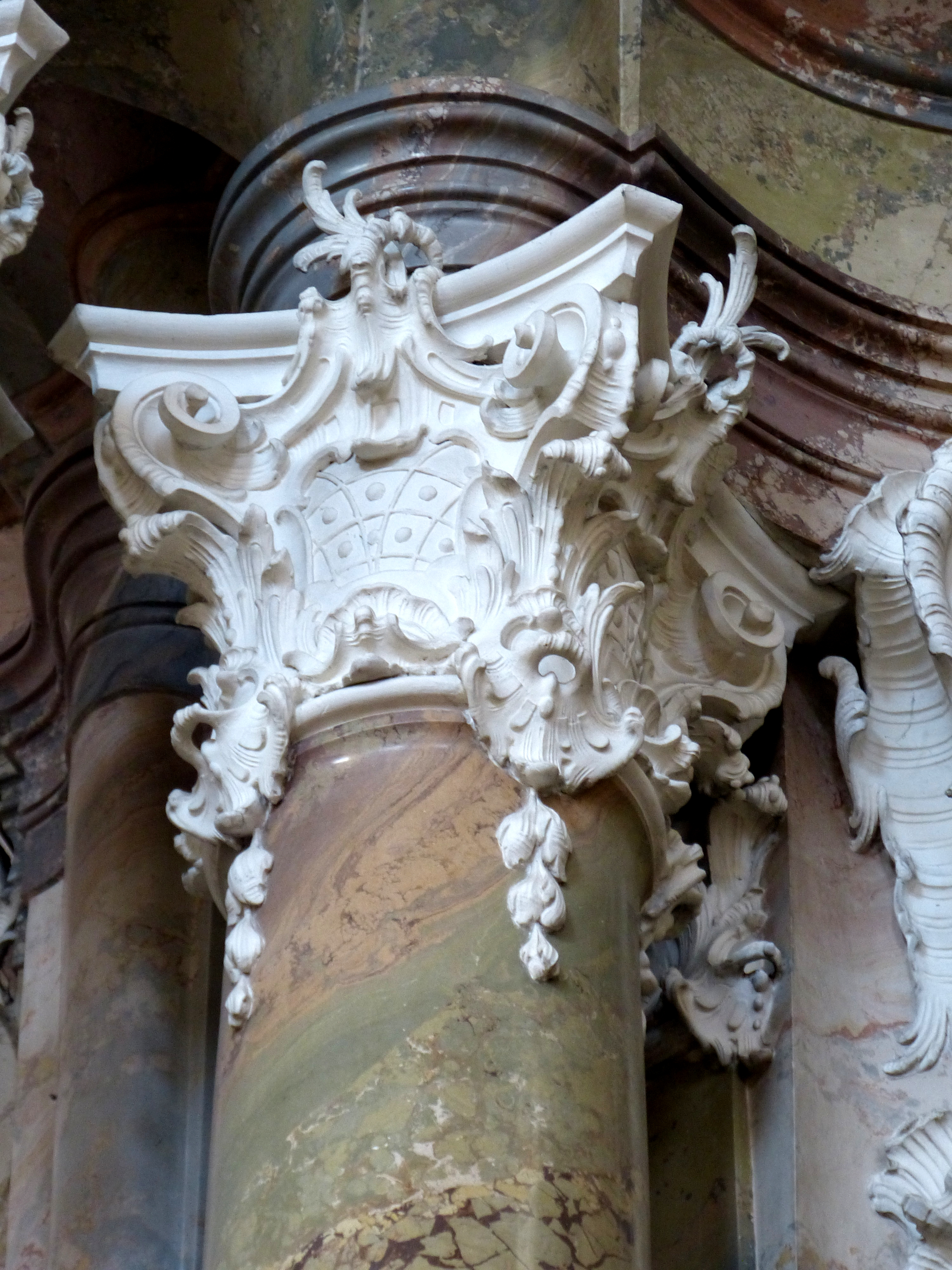
Rococo capital at Engelszell Abbey, Austria (1754–1764)

These interiors commonly combine moulded stucco, carved wood, and quadratura (illusionistic ceiling frescoes). These frescoes simulate open skies populated by putti and allegorical figures. Common materials include painted or white stucco, wood marquetry (mainly oak, beech, or walnut), japanned lacquerwork, ormolu (gilded bronze), and marble. Art historians Stephan Tschudi-Madsen and Debora L. Silverman cite the Rococo usage of asymmetrical, curvilinear, and botanical elements as a source for the late-19th-century Art Nouveau movement.

== France ==
The Rocaille style, or French Rococo, appeared in Paris during the reign of Louis XV, and flourished between about 1723 and 1759. The characteristics of French Rococo include exceptional artistry and the use of vegetal forms (vines, leaves, flowers) intertwined in complex designs. The style was used particularly in salons, a new type of room designed to impress and entertain guests, the most prominent example being the salon of the Princess in Hôtel de Soubise in Paris, designed by Germain Boffrand and Charles-Joseph Natoire between 1735 and 1740.

Furniture from the era also features the sinuous curves and vegetal designs characteristic of the style, especially in the complex frames made for mirrors and paintings, which were sculpted in plaster and often gilded. The leading furniture designers and craftsmen in the style included Juste-Aurele Meissonier, Charles Cressent, and Nicolas Pineau.

French Rococo never achieved the extravagance of the style seen in Bavaria, Austria, or Italy. Lasting until the mid-18th century, the discoveries of Roman antiquities at Herculaneum in 1738 and Pompeii in 1748 turned French architecture in the direction of the more symmetrical and less flamboyant neo-classicism.

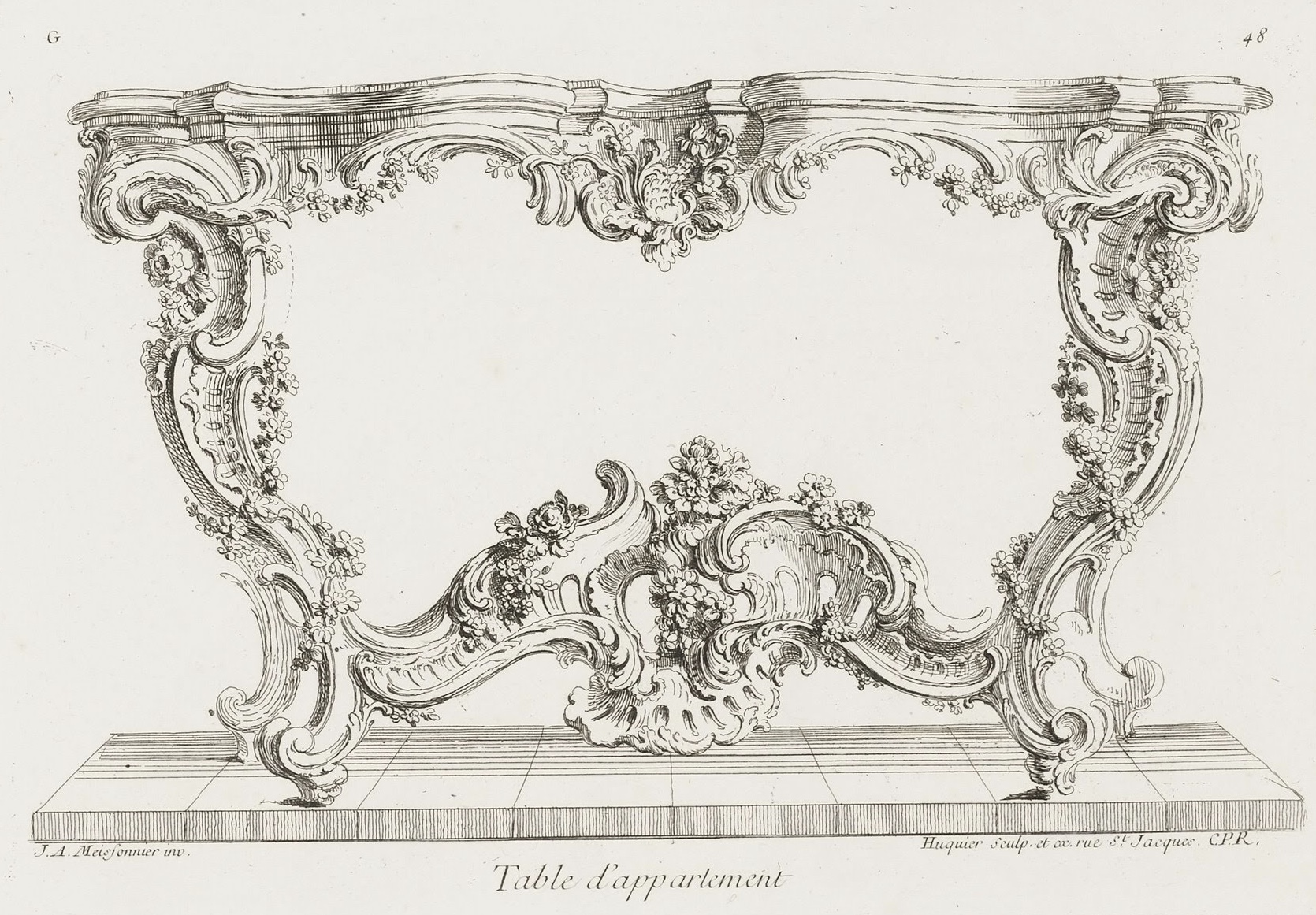
Table design by Juste-Aurele Meissonier (1730)

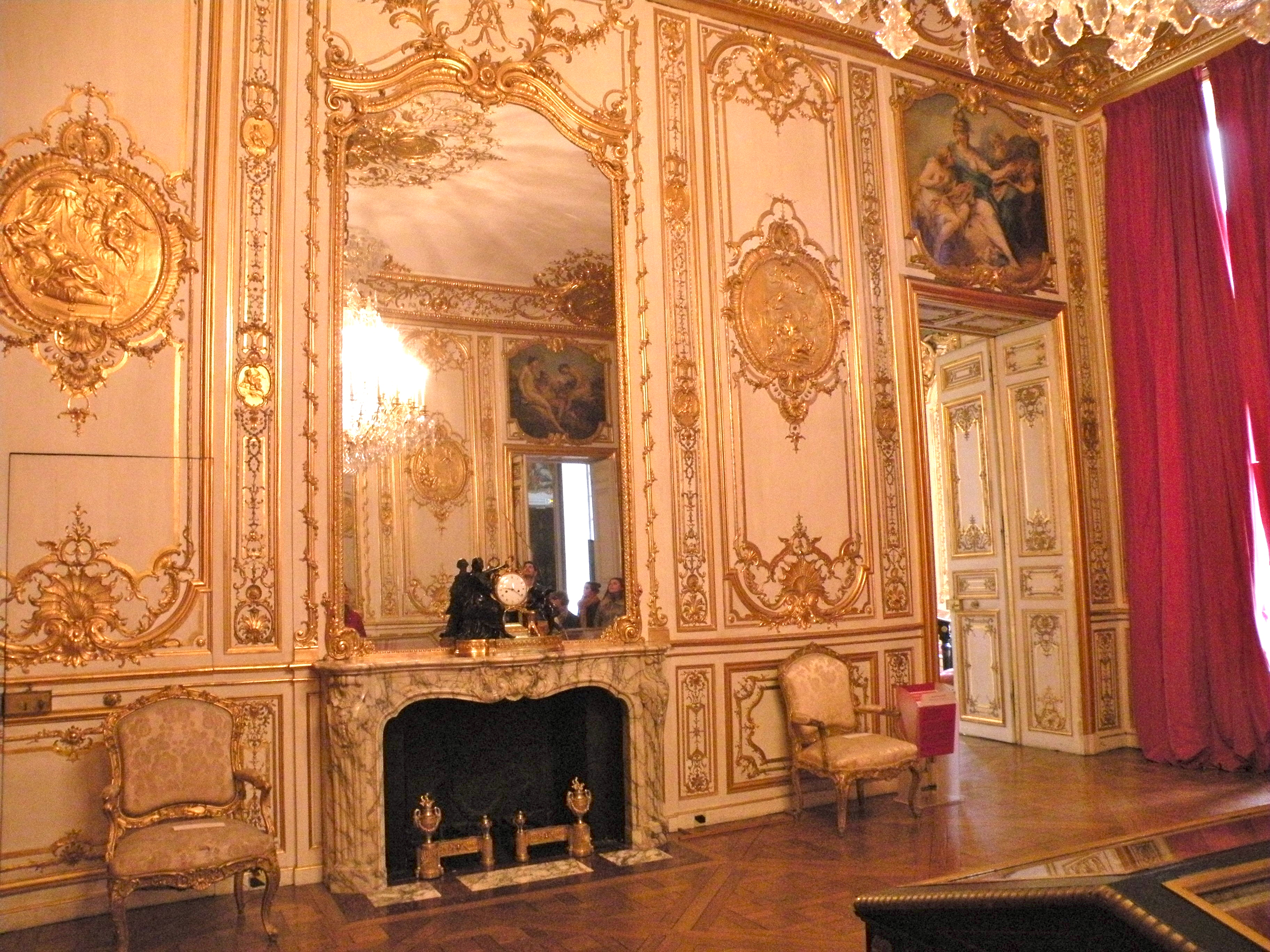
Grand Chamber of the Prince, Hôtel de Soubise (1735–1740)

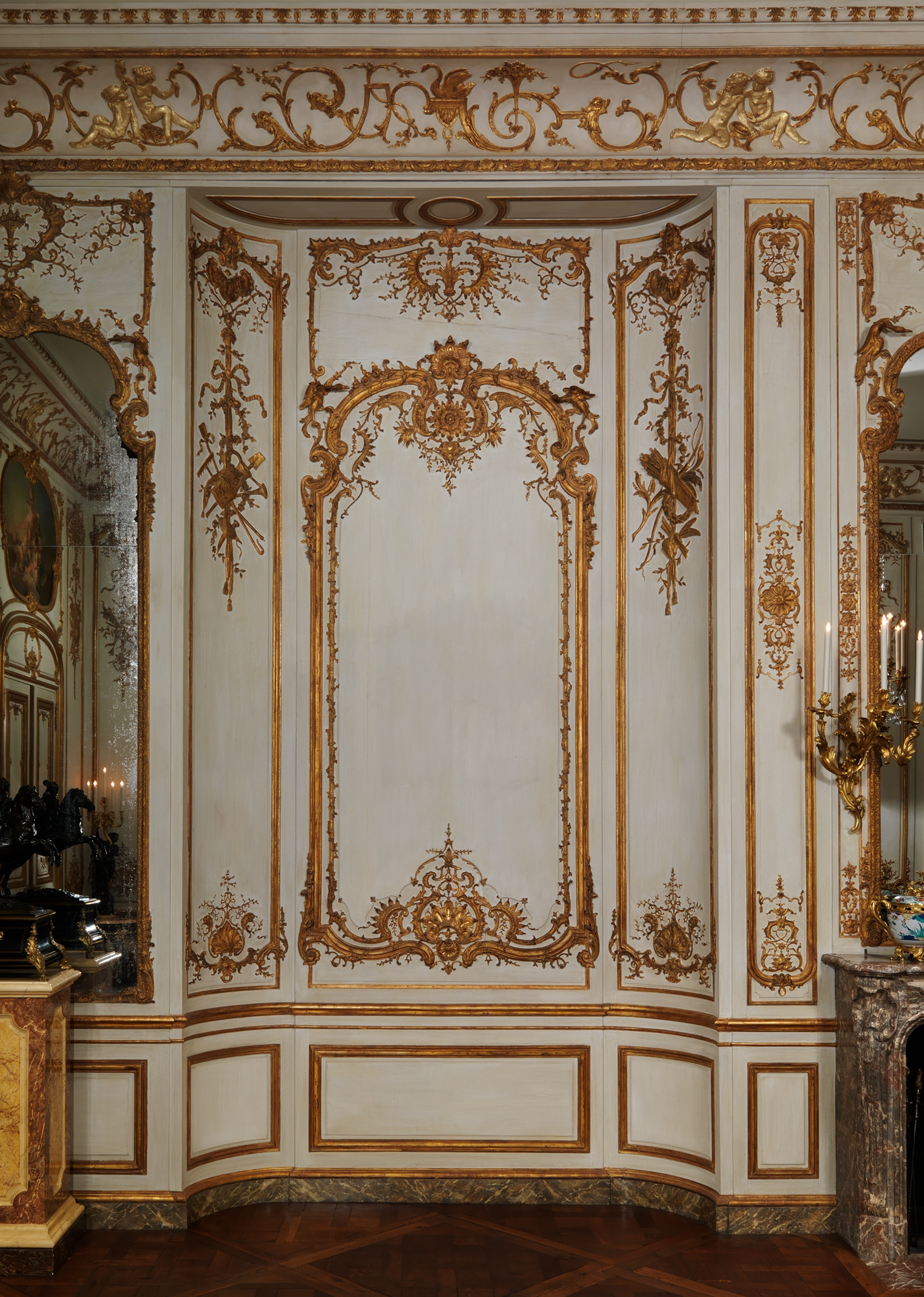
Woodwork in the Hôtel de Varengeville by Nicolas Pineau (1735)

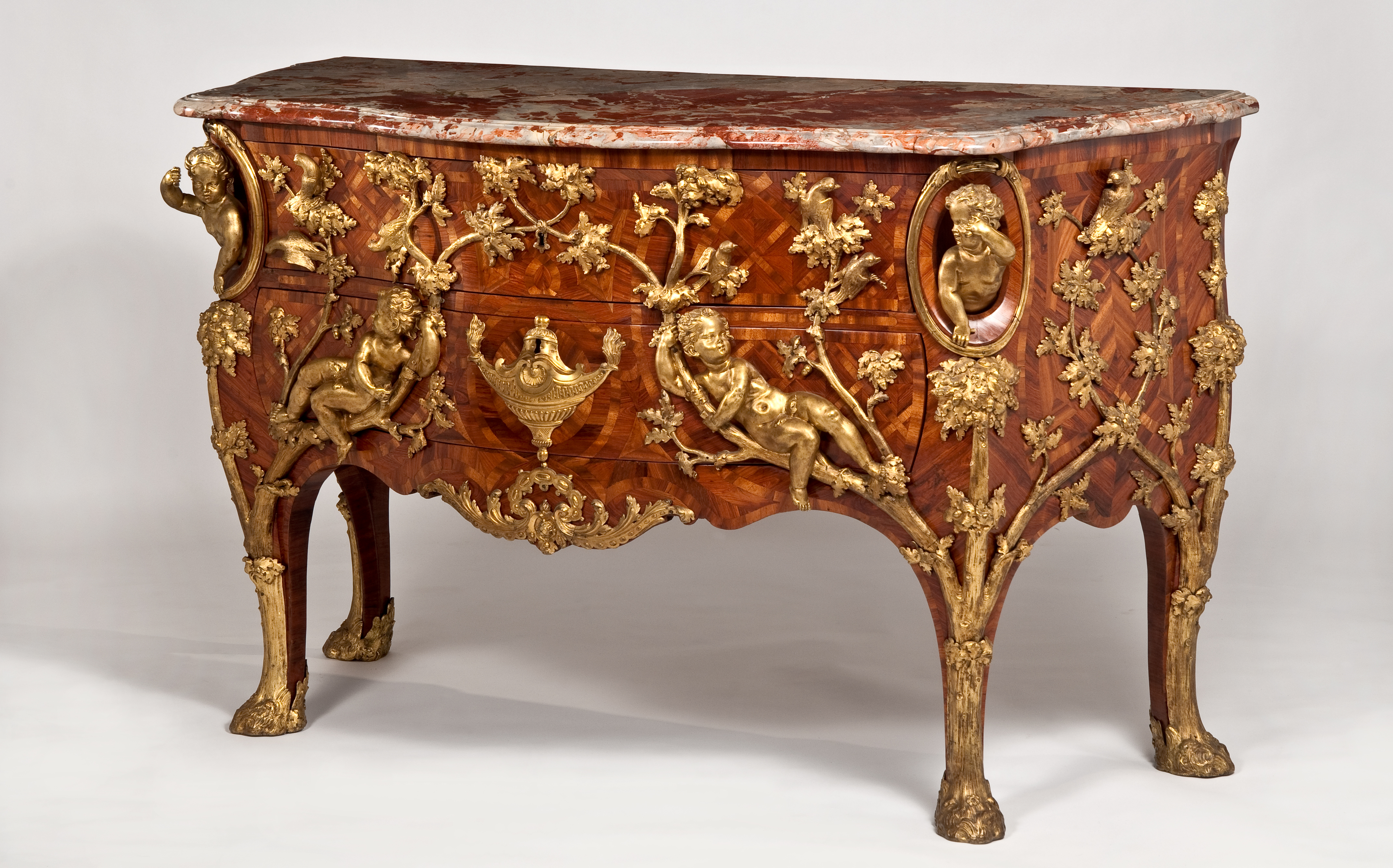
Chest of drawers by Charles Cressent (1730), Waddesdon Manor

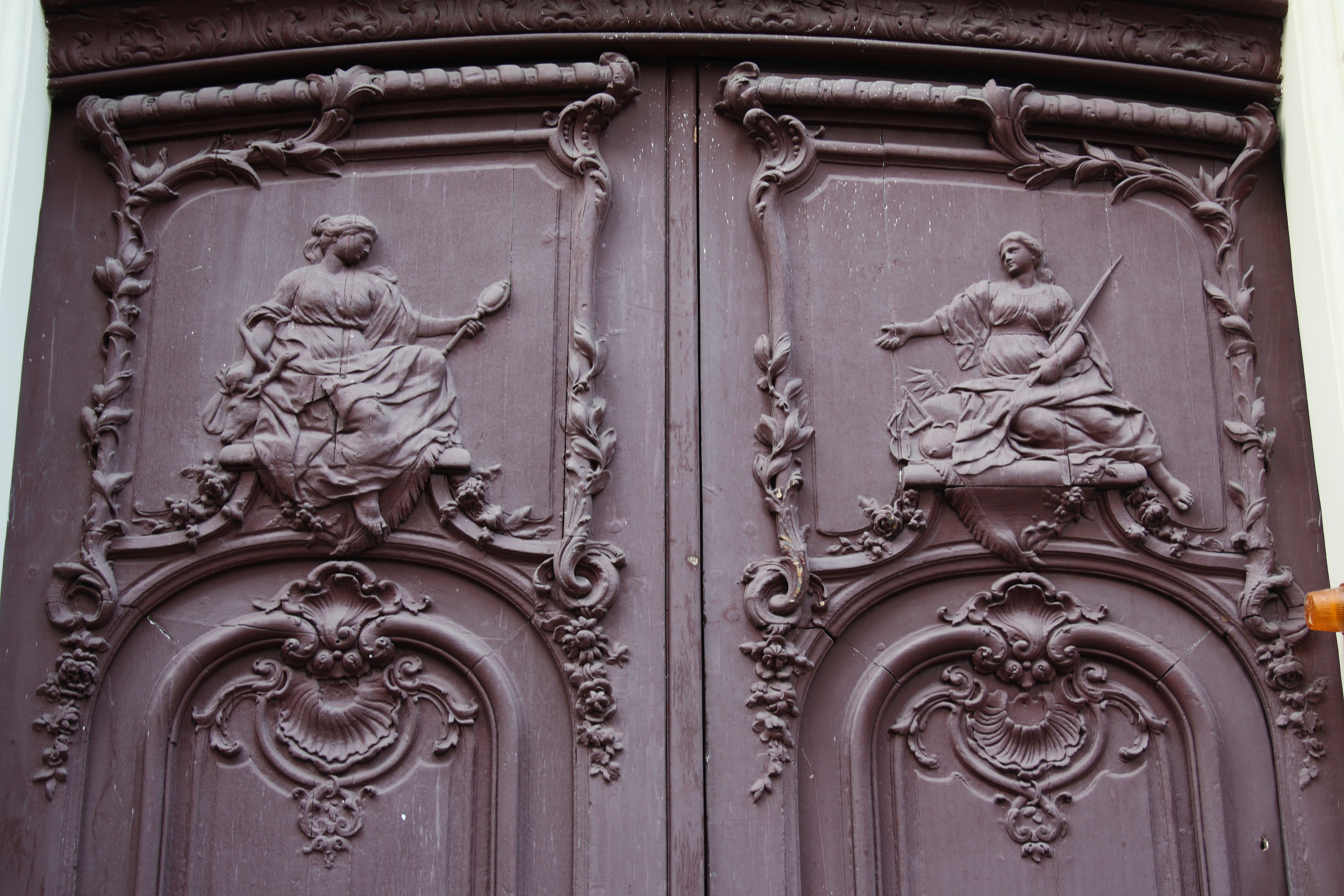
Detail of a door of the Hôtel de Samuel Bernard from Paris (1740s)

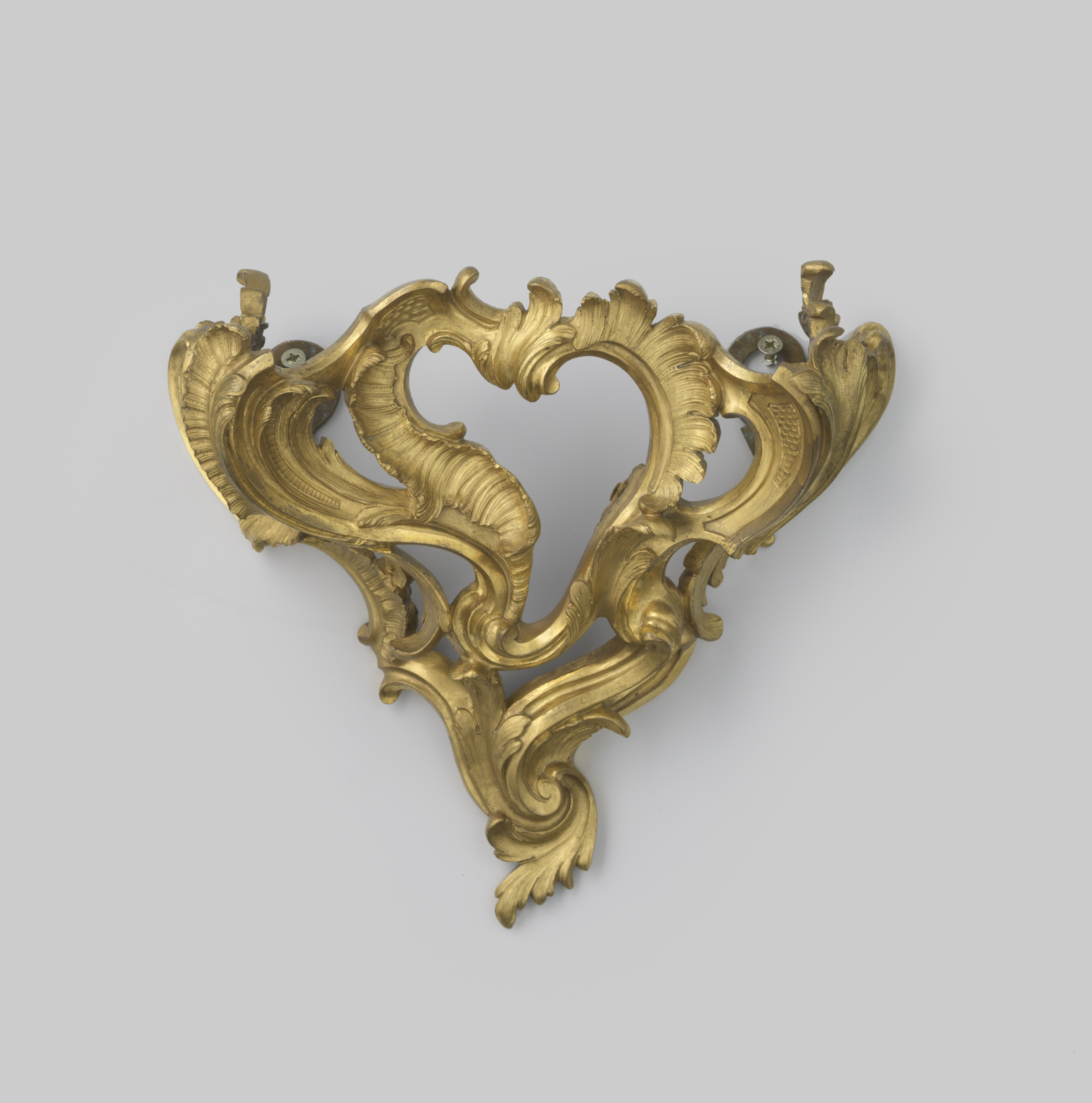
Gilt and hammered bronze corbel of a clock by Jean Joseph de Saint-Germain and J. Boullé (c. 1745 – c. 1749)

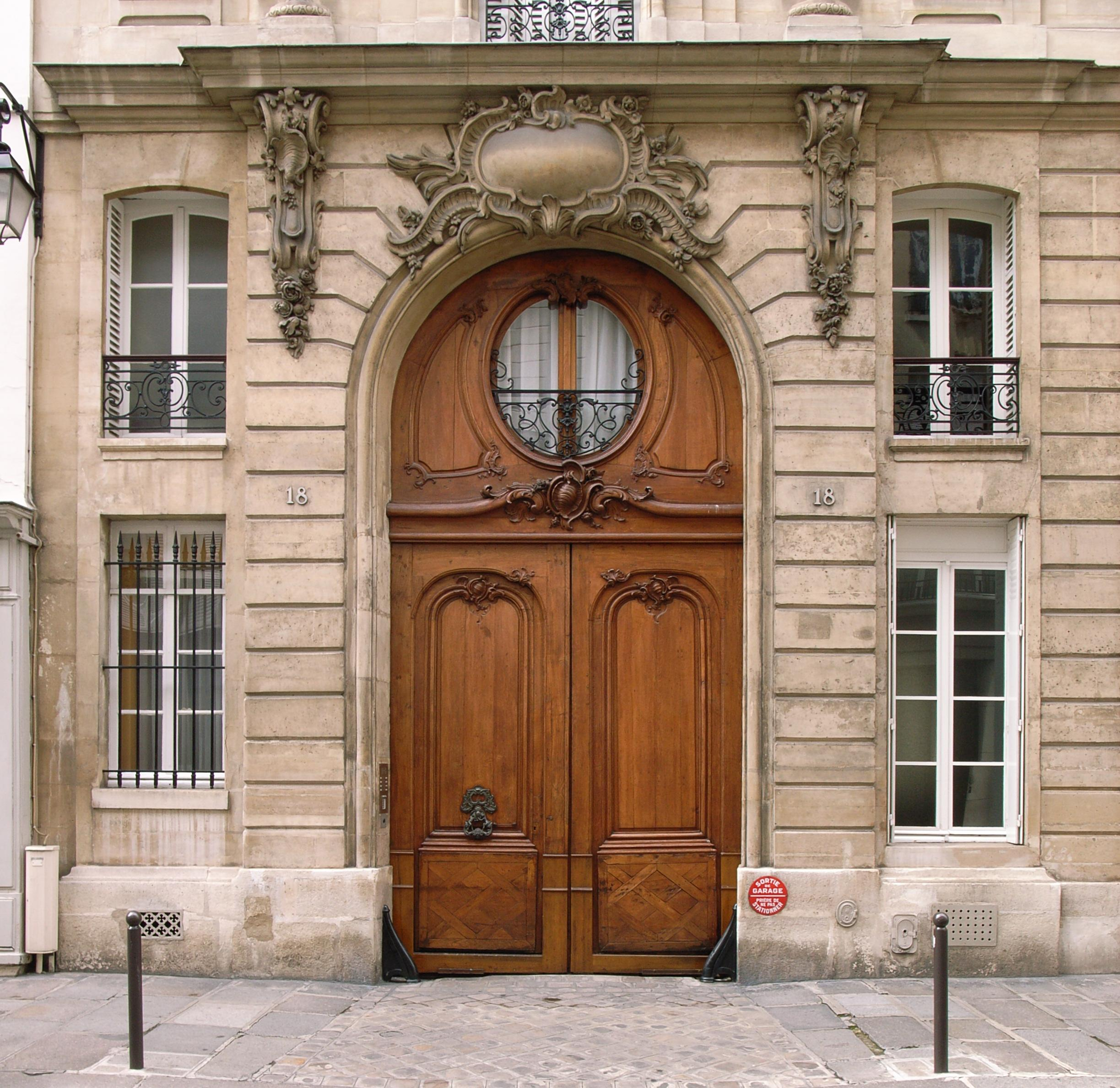
The door of the Hôtel de Marsilly, with two corbels and a cartouche above it, all of them being rococo

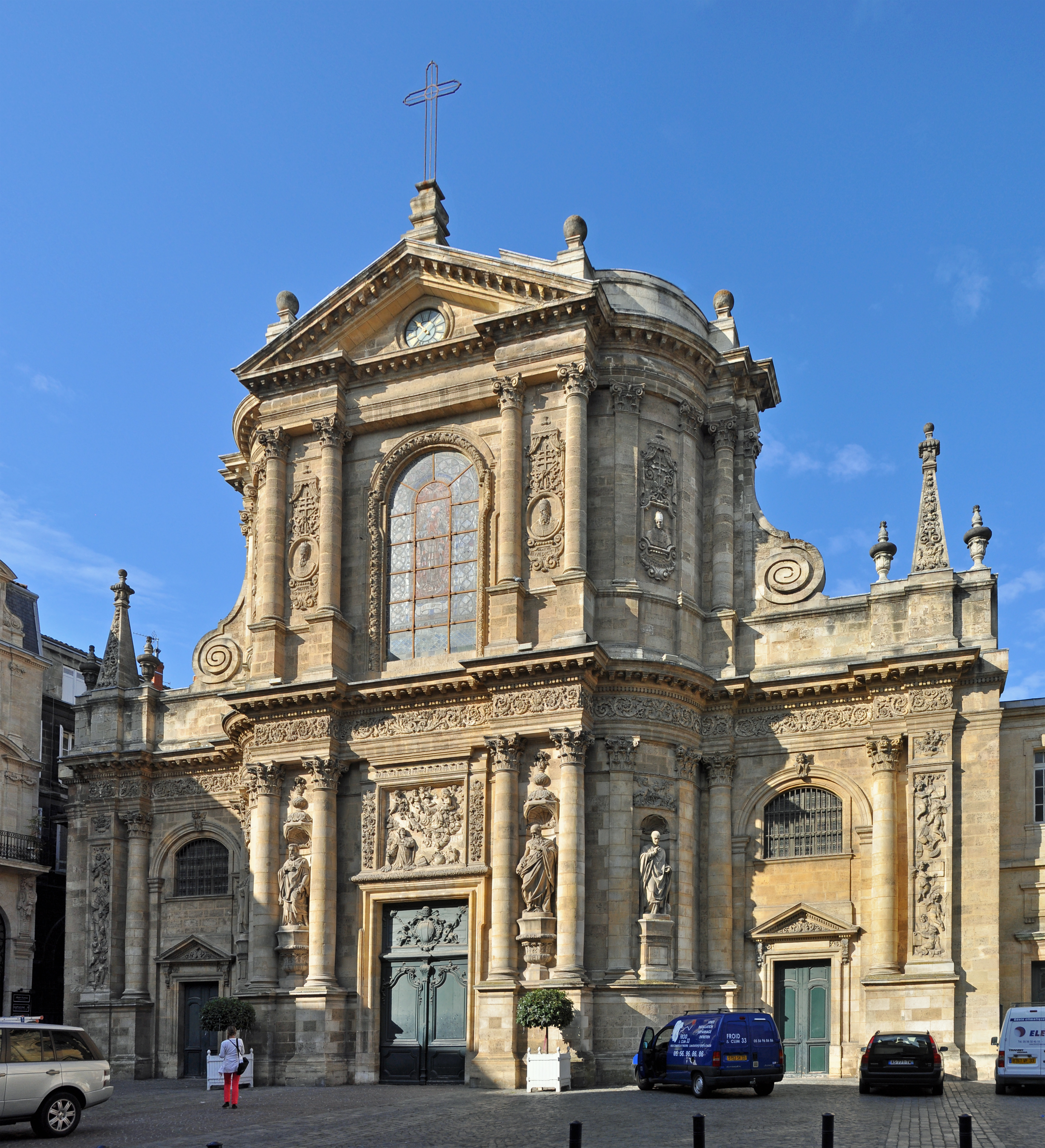
Eglise Notre-Dame, Bordeaux (1684–1707)

== Italy ==
Artists in Italy, particularly Venice, produced their own version of the Rococo style. Venetian commodes imitated the curving lines and carved ornaments of the French Rocaille, but with a particular Venetian variation; the pieces were painted—often with landscapes, flowers, scenes from Guardi or other painters, or Chinoiserie—against a blue or green background, matching the colours of the Venetian school of painters whose work decorated salons.

Notable decorative painters included Giovanni Battista Crosato, who painted the ballroom ceiling of the Ca' Rezzonico in the quadraturo manner, and Giovanni Battista Tiepolo, who painted ceilings and murals in both churches and palazzos. Tiepolo travelled to Germany with his son from 1750 to 1753, decorating the ceilings of the Würzburg Residence, one of the major landmarks of Bavarian Rococo. Another celebrated Venetian painter was Giovanni Battista Piazzetta, who painted several notable church ceilings.

Venetian Rococo also featured exceptional glassware, particularly Murano glass, which was often engraved and coloured, and was exported across Europe. Works included multicolour chandeliers and mirrors with extremely ornate frames.

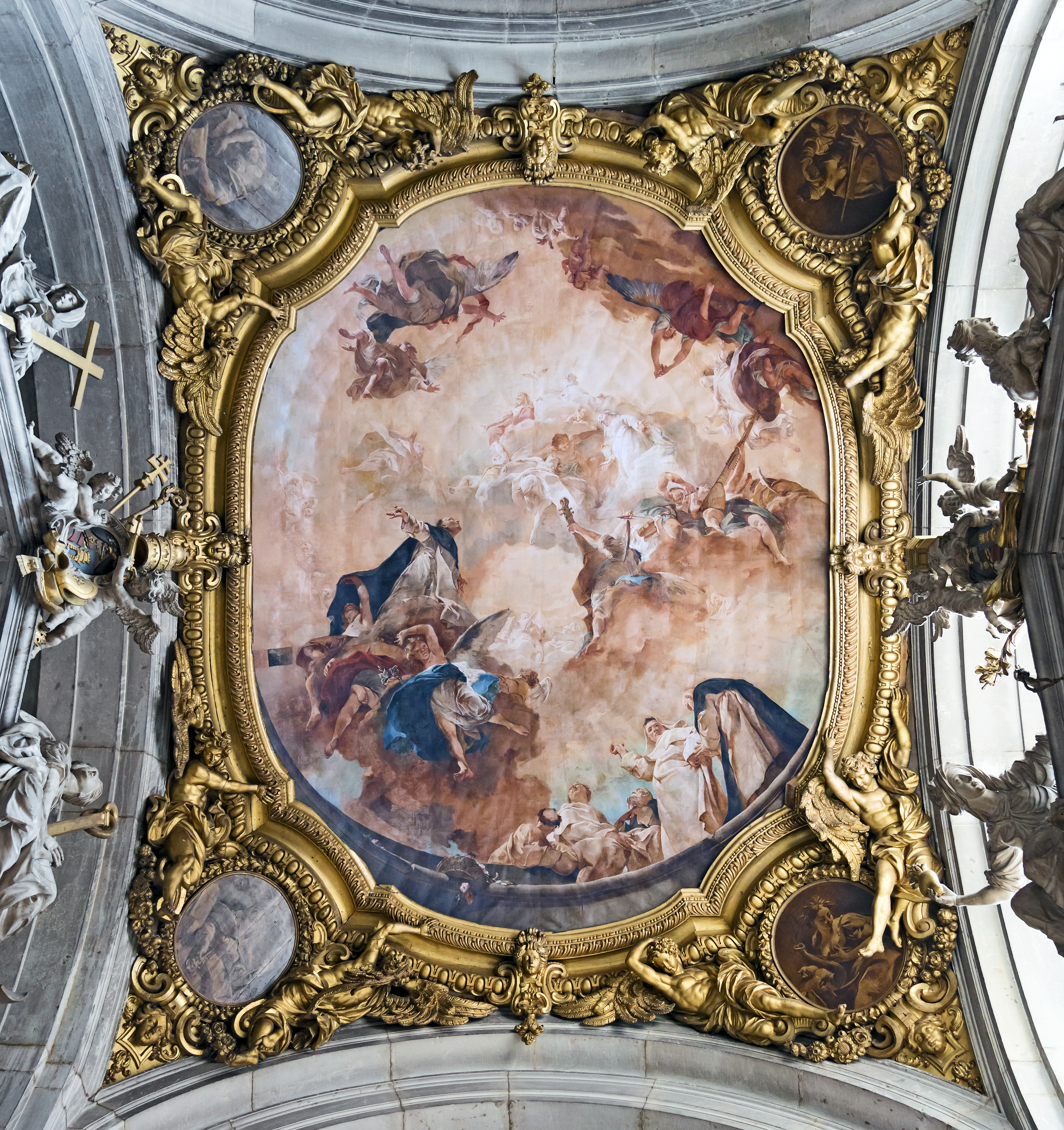
Ceiling of Santi Giovanni e Paolo, Venice, by Piazzetta (1727)

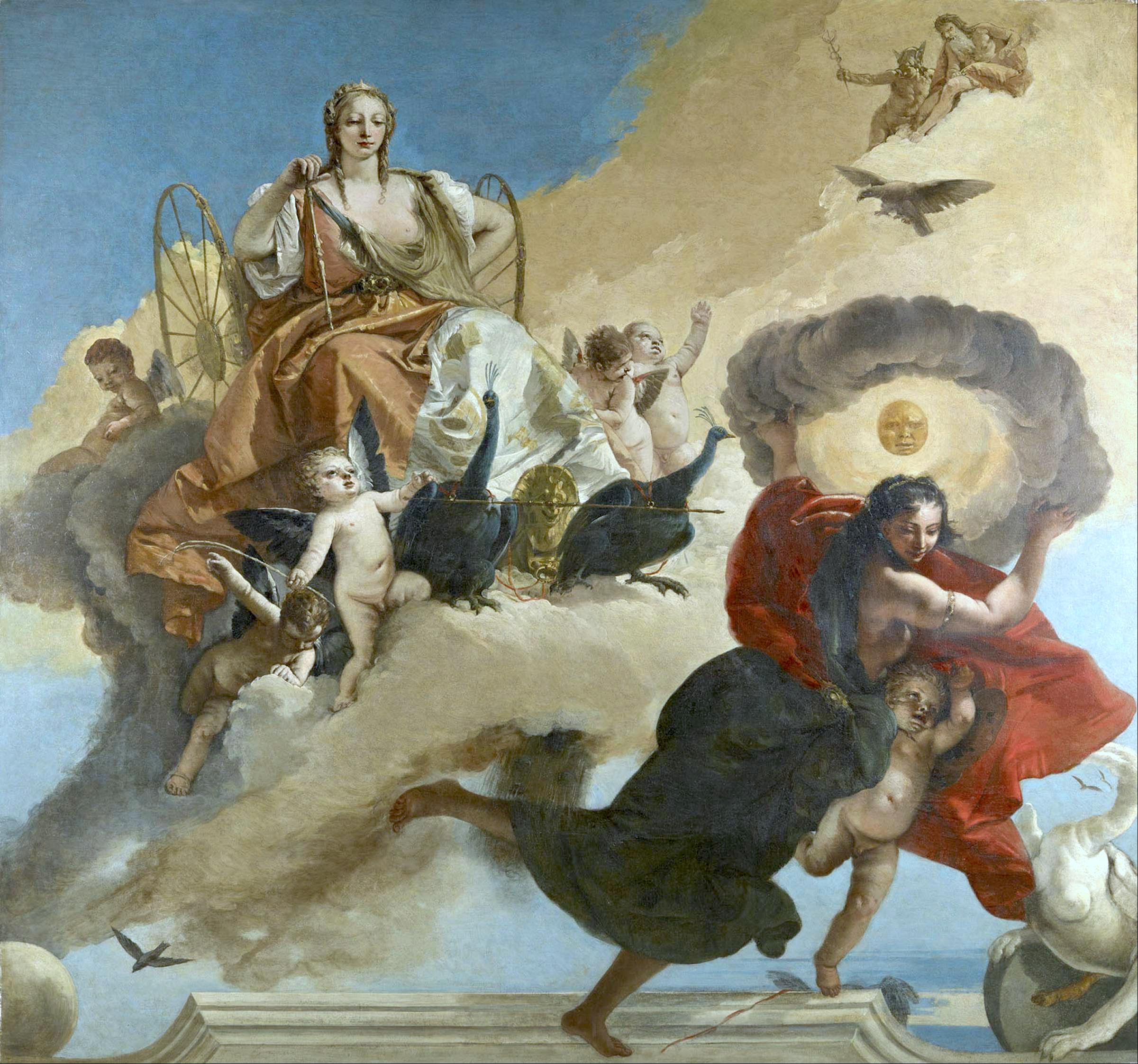
Juno and Luna by Giovanni Battista Tiepolo (1735–1745)

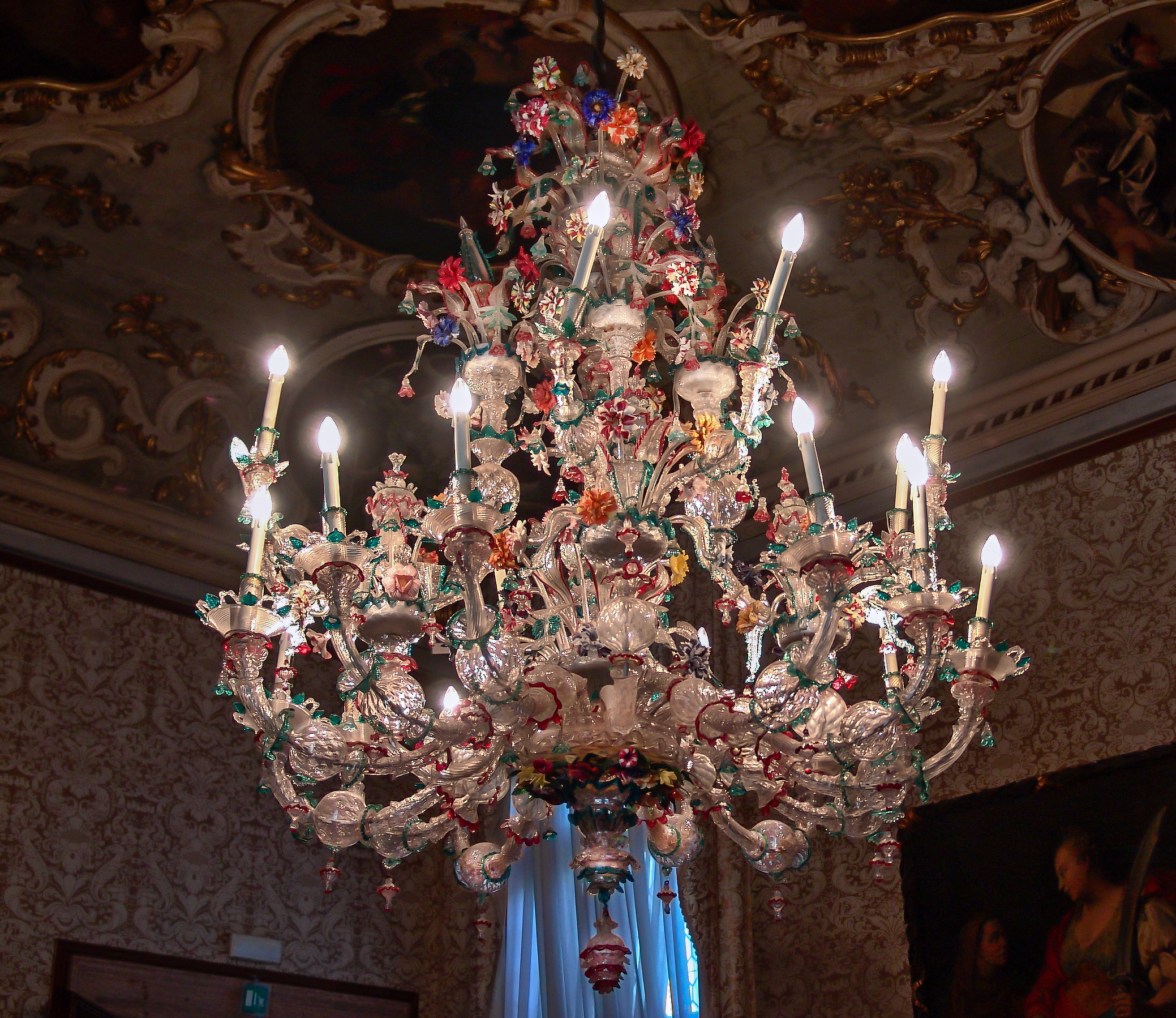
Murano glass chandelier at the Ca' Rezzonico (1758)

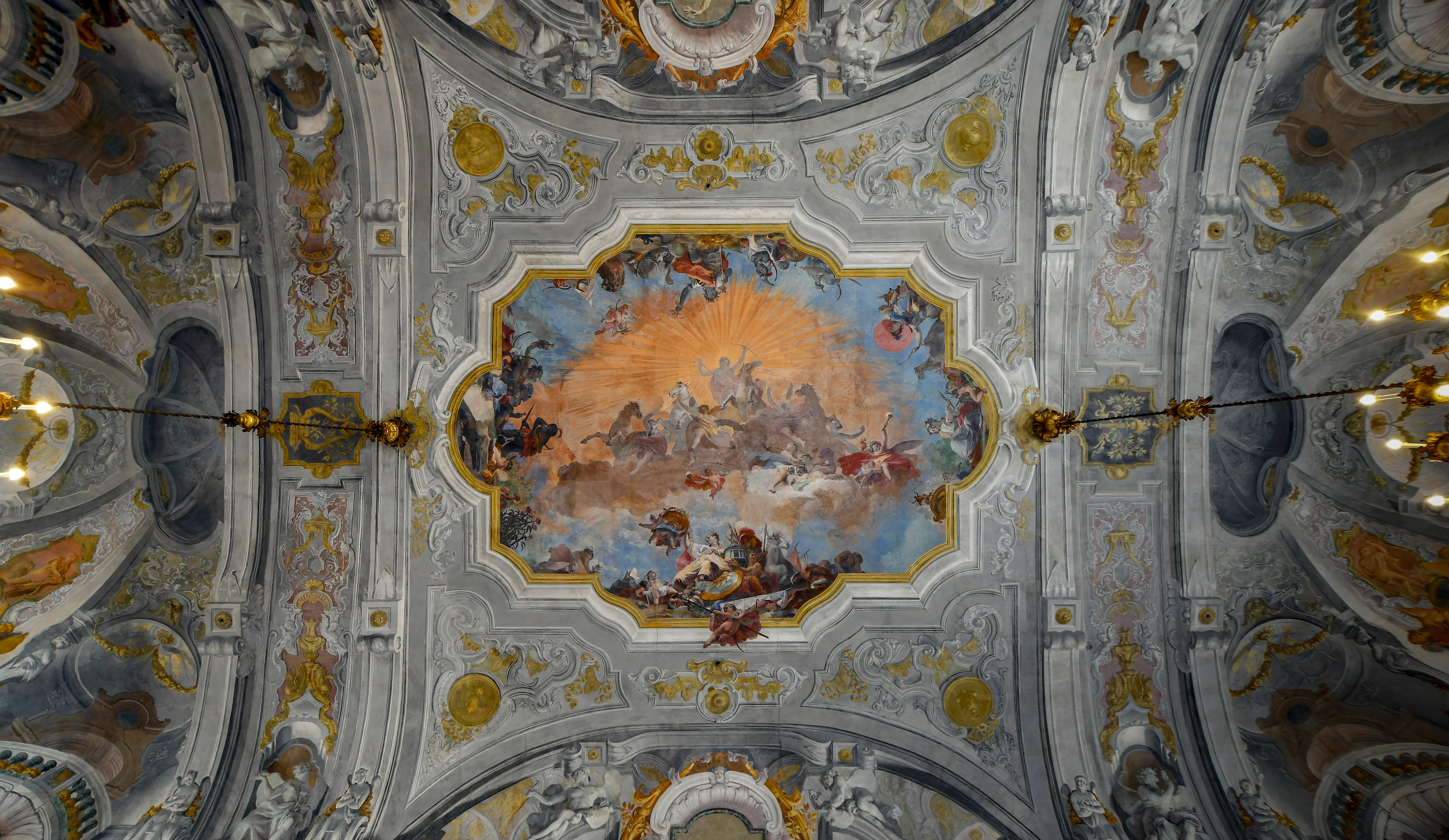
Ballroom ceiling of the Ca' Rezzonico with ceiling by Giovanni Battista Crosato (1753)

== Southern Germany ==
The Rococo decorative style reached its summit in southern Germany and Austria from the 1730s until the 1770s. There it dominates the church landscape to this day and is deeply anchored in popular culture. It was first introduced from France through the publications and works of French architects and decorators, including sculptor Claude III Audran, interior designer Gilles-Marie Oppenordt, architect Germain Boffrand, sculptor Jean Mondon, and draftsman and engraver Pierre Lepautre. Their work had an important influence on the German Rococo style, but does not reach the extravagance of buildings in southern Germany.

German architects adapted the Rococo style by making it far more asymmetrical and ornate than the original French. The German style was characterized by an explosion of forms that cascaded down the walls. It featured molding formed into curves and counter-curves, twisting and turning patterns, and stucco foliage which seemed to be creeping up the walls and across the ceiling. The decoration was often gilded or silvered to give it contrast with the white or pale pastel walls.

One of the first Rococo buildings in Germany, the pavilion of Amalienburg in Munich (1734–1739), was created by the Belgian-born architect and designer François de Cuvilliés, who was inspired by the pavilions of the Grand Trianon and the Château de Marly in France. It was built as a hunting lodge, with a platform on the roof for shooting pheasants. The interior Hall of Mirrors by painter and stucco sculptor Johann Baptist Zimmermann is far more elaborate than any French Rococo.

Another notable example of early German Rococo is the Würzburg Residence (1720–1744), commissioned by Prince-Bishop Johann Philipp Franz von Schönborn. Early in the palace's construction, court architect Balthasar Neumann travelled to Paris and consulted with the French rocaille decorative artists Germain Boffrand and Robert de Cotte. While the exterior of the palace is in the more sober Baroque style, the interior, particularly the stairways and ceilings, is much more extravagant. Neumann described the interior of the residence as "a theatre of light." From 1750–1753, the Italian Rococo painter Giovanni Battista Tiepolo was imported to create a mural over the top of the three-level ceremonial stairway. Neumann also designed the iconic Rococo stairway at Augustusburg Castle in Brühl (1725–1768), which leads visitors up through a fantasy of painting, sculpture, and ironwork, with surprising views at every turn.

In the 1740s and 1750s, a number of pilgrimage churches were constructed in Bavaria with interiors decorated in a distinctive variant of Rococo style. One of the most notable examples is the Wieskirche (1745–1754) designed by Dominikus Zimmermann. Like most Bavarian pilgrimage churches, the exterior is very simple, with pastel walls and little ornament. Entering the church, the visitor encounters an astonishing harmony of art and form. The oval-shaped sanctuary, preceded to the west by a semicircular antechamber, fills the church with light from all sides. The white walls are contrasted with columns of blue and pink stucco in the choir, and the domed ceiling is painted in the appearance of an open sky, across which, angels fly. Other notable Bavarian pilgrimage churches include the Basilica of the Fourteen Holy Helpers by Balthasar Neumann (1743–1772), and Ottobeuren Abbey (1748–1766) by Johann Michael Fischer, which features, like much of German Rococo architecture, a remarkable contrast between the regularity of its facade and the overabundance of decoration in its interior.

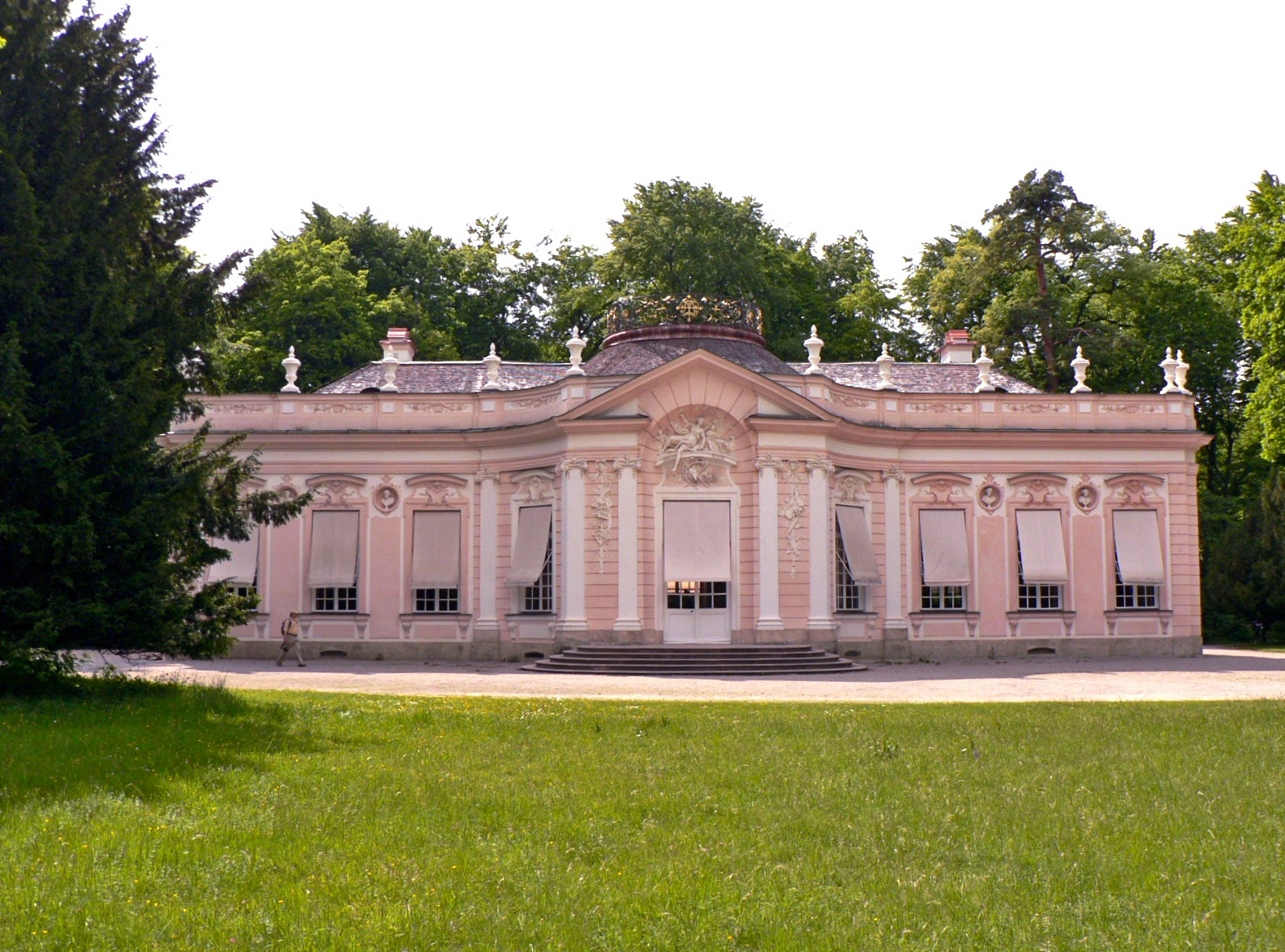
Amalienburg pavilion in Munich by François de Cuvilliés (1734–1739)

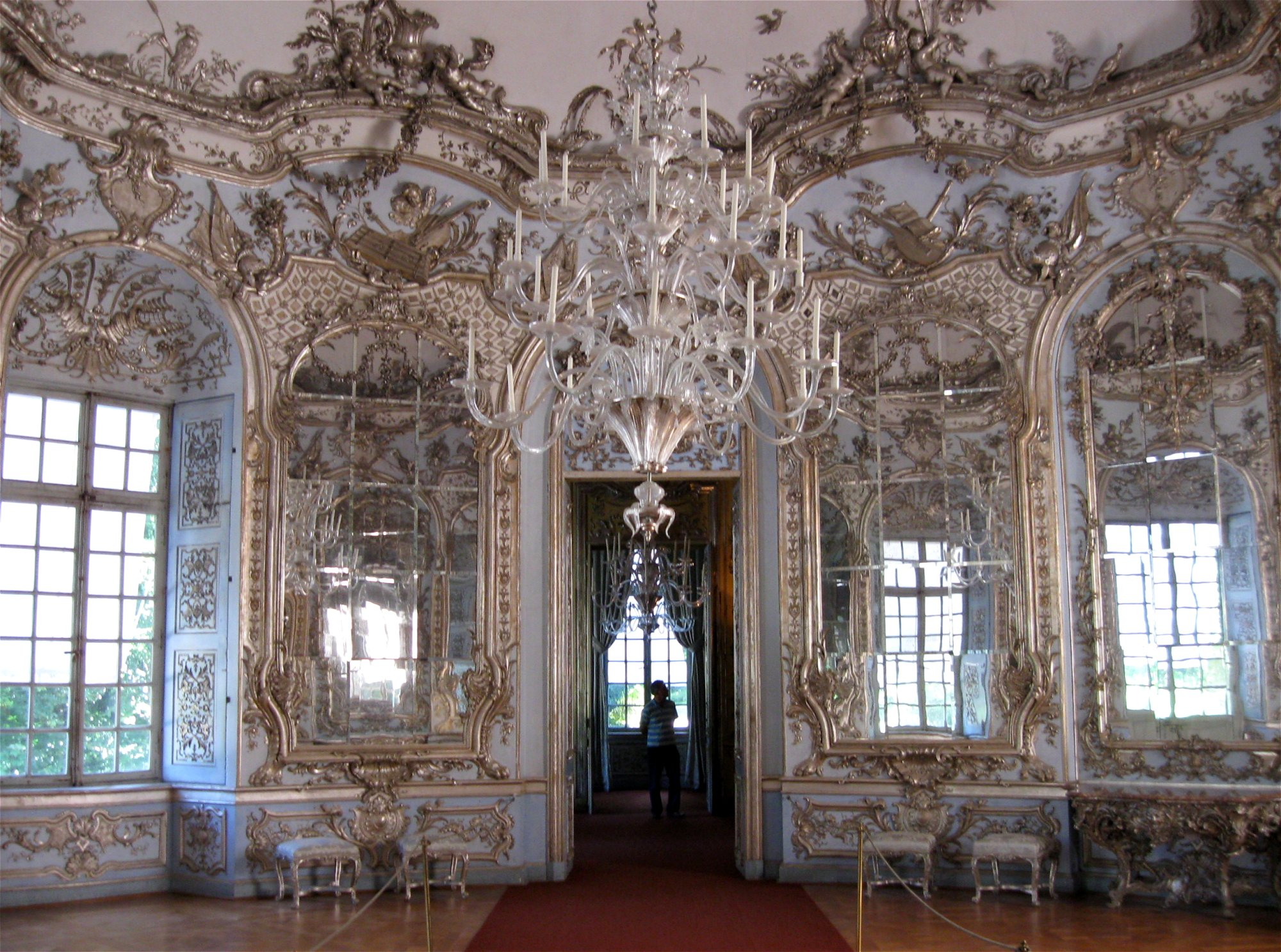
Hall of Mirrors of Amalienburg by Johann Baptist Zimmermann (1734–1739)

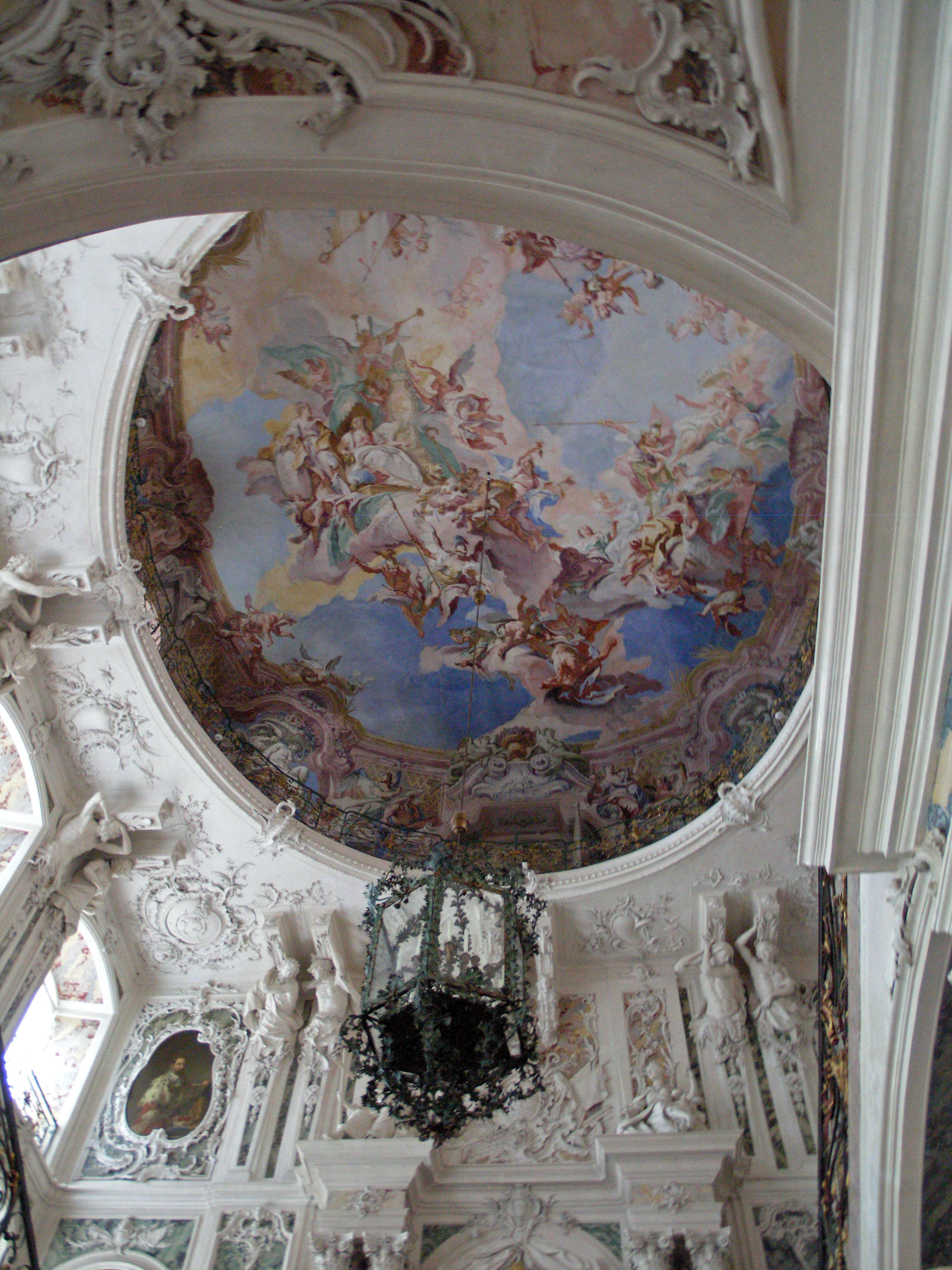
Looking up the central stairway at Augustusburg Palace in Brühl by Balthasar Neumann (1741–1744)

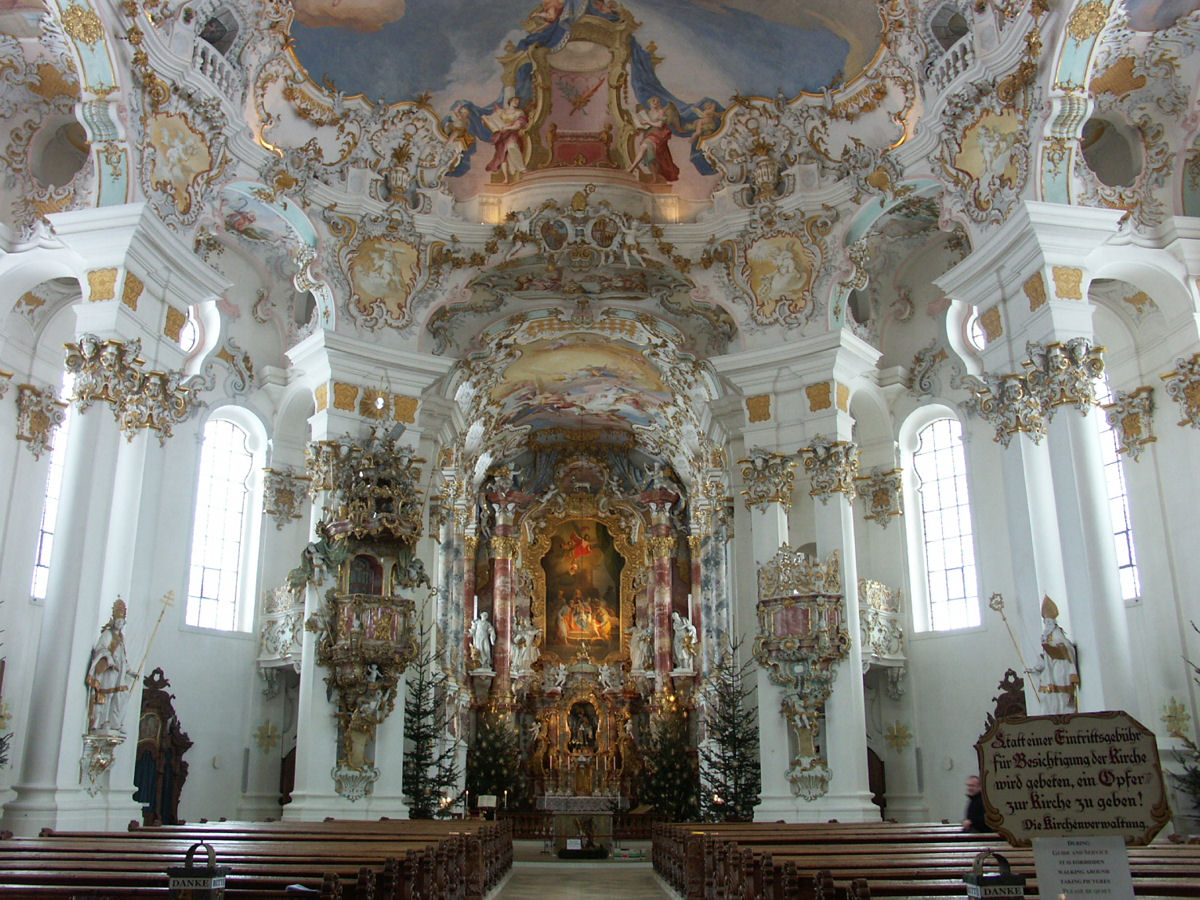
The Wieskirche by Dominikus Zimmermann (1745–1754)

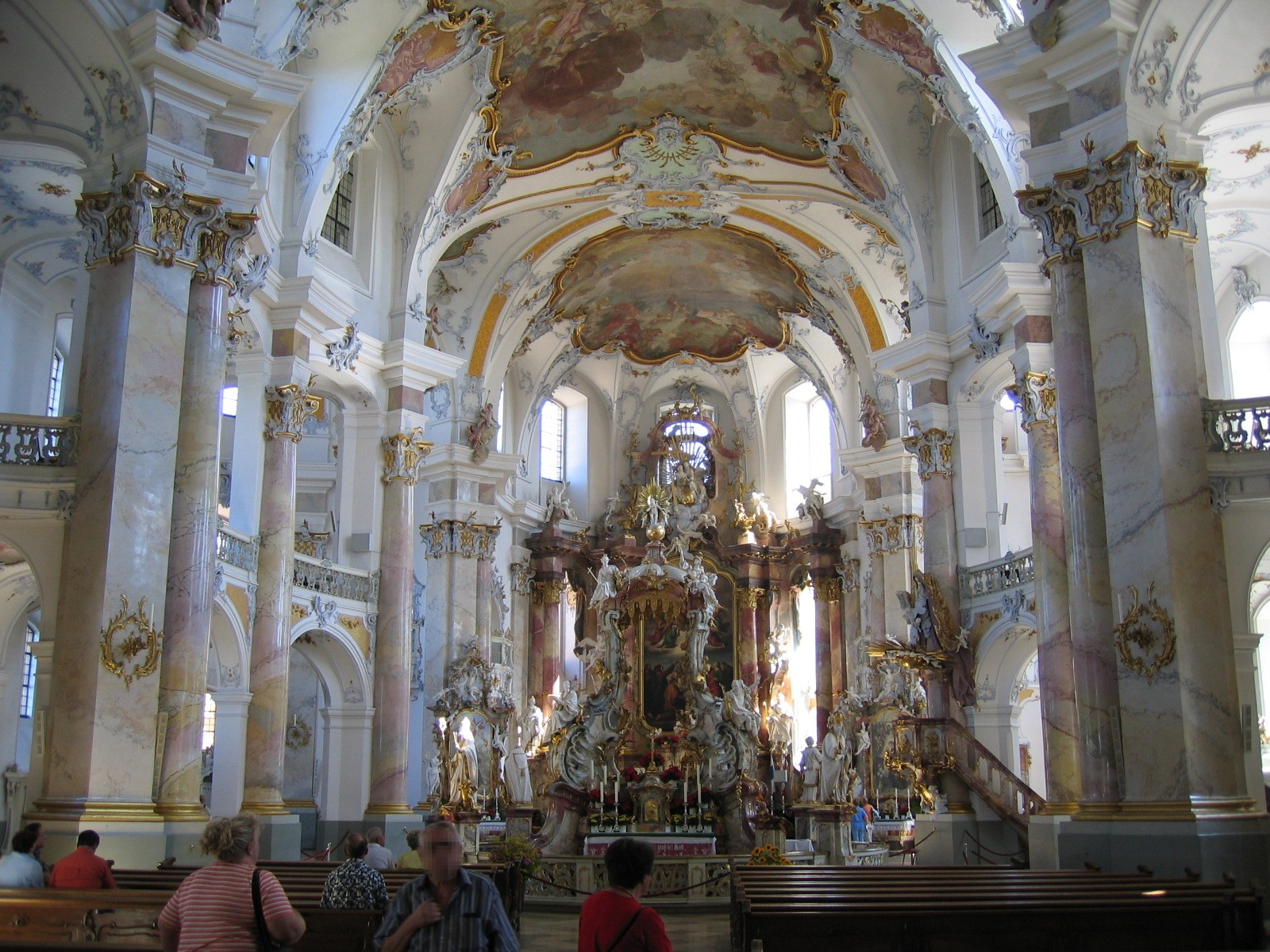
Interior of the Basilica of the Fourteen Holy Helpers by Balthasar Neumann (1743–1772)

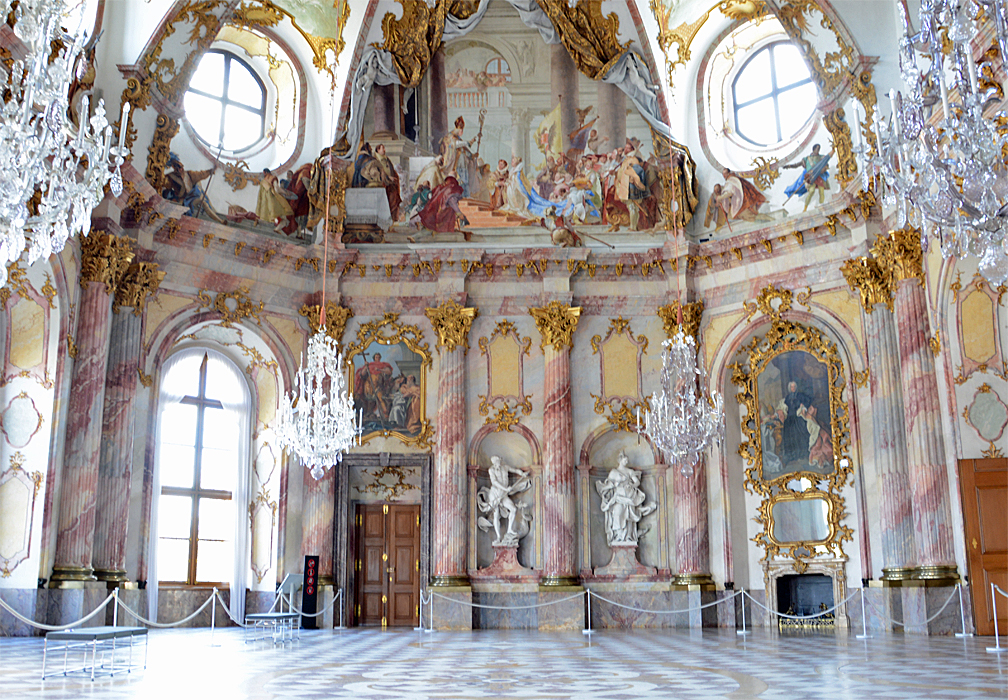
Kaisersaal in the Würzburg Residence by Balthasar Neumann (1749–1751)

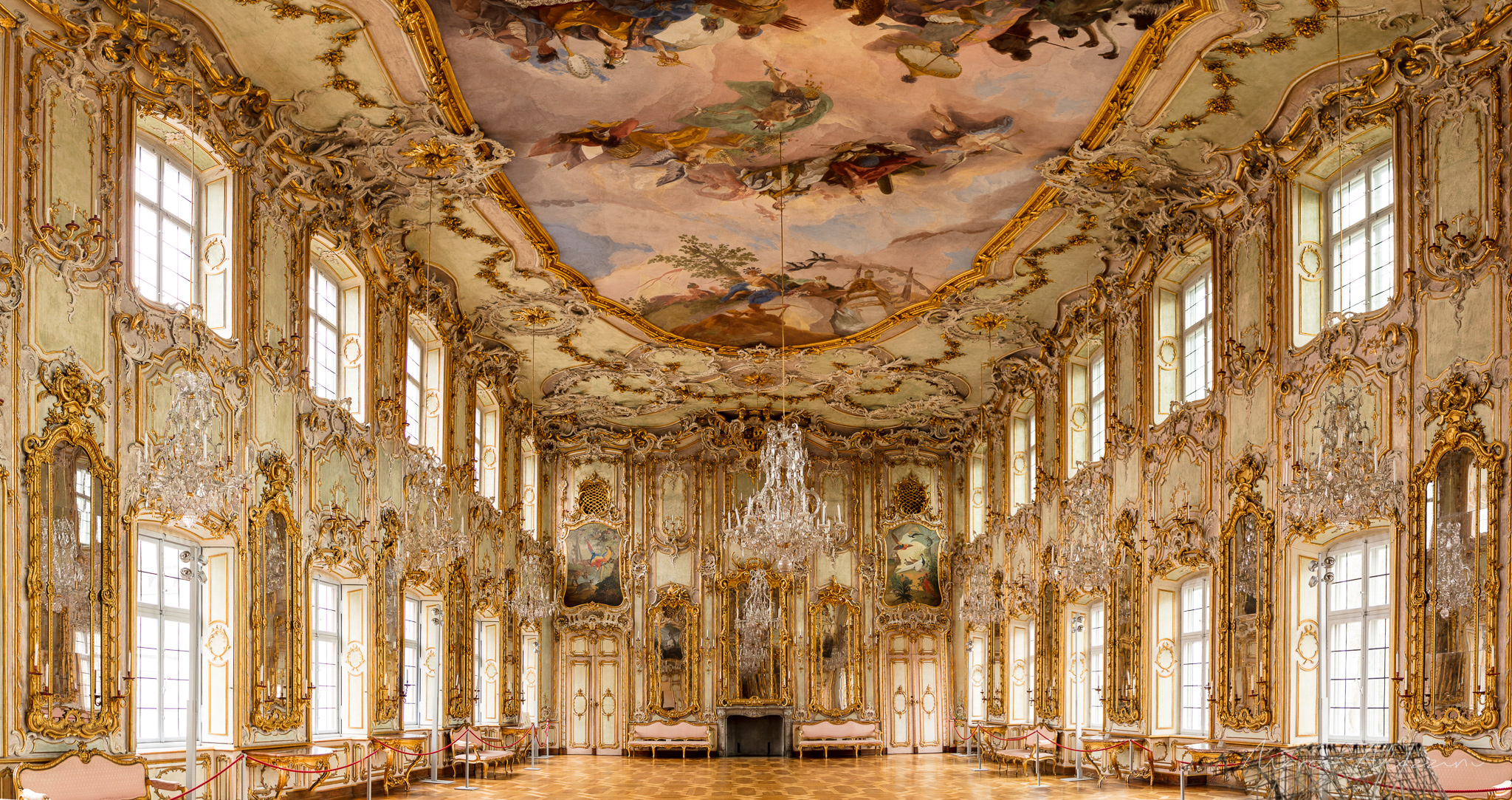
Festival Hall of the Schaezlerpalais in Augsburg by Carl Albert von Lespilliez (1765–1770)

== England ==
In Great Britain, rococo had less influence on design and the decorative arts than in continental Europe, although its influence was still felt in such areas as silverwork, porcelain, and furniture.

Throughout the early 18th-century, English furniture followed the neoclassical Palladian model under designer William Kent, who designed for Lord Burlington and other important patrons of the arts. As a result, Rococo was slow to arrive in England, first appearing in the 1730s through the work of immigrant artists and Huguenot refugees from France, including the silversmith Paul de Lamerie. The St Martin's Lane Academy, founded by William Hogarth in 1735, was also integral to introducing Rococo style to designers and artists in England.

The Rococo flourished in England between 1740 and 1770. In an effort to compete with imported French goods, furniture designers developed a distinctly British style of Rococo most commonly used in woodcarving. The most influential of these designers was Thomas Chippendale, whose 1754 book The Gentleman and Cabinet Maker's Director, a catalogue of designs for rococo, chinoiserie, and Gothic furniture, achieved wide popularity. Unlike French designers, Chippendale did not employ marquetry or inlays in his furniture. The predominant designers of inlaid furniture were Vile and Cob, the cabinet-makers for King George III. Another important figure in British furniture was Thomas Johnson, who in 1761, published a catalogue of Rococo furniture designs. This included furnishings based on rather fantastic Chinese and Indian motifs, including a canopy bed crowned by a Chinese pagoda (now in the Victoria and Albert Museum).

Another notable figure of the British Rococo is the silversmith Charles Friedrich Kandler.

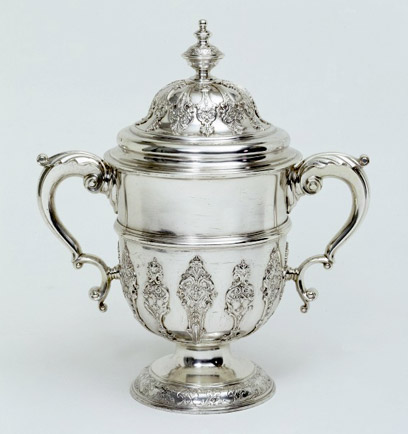
Cup and Cover, made by Paul de Lamerie, 1736–7 Victoria and Albert Museum no. 819-1890

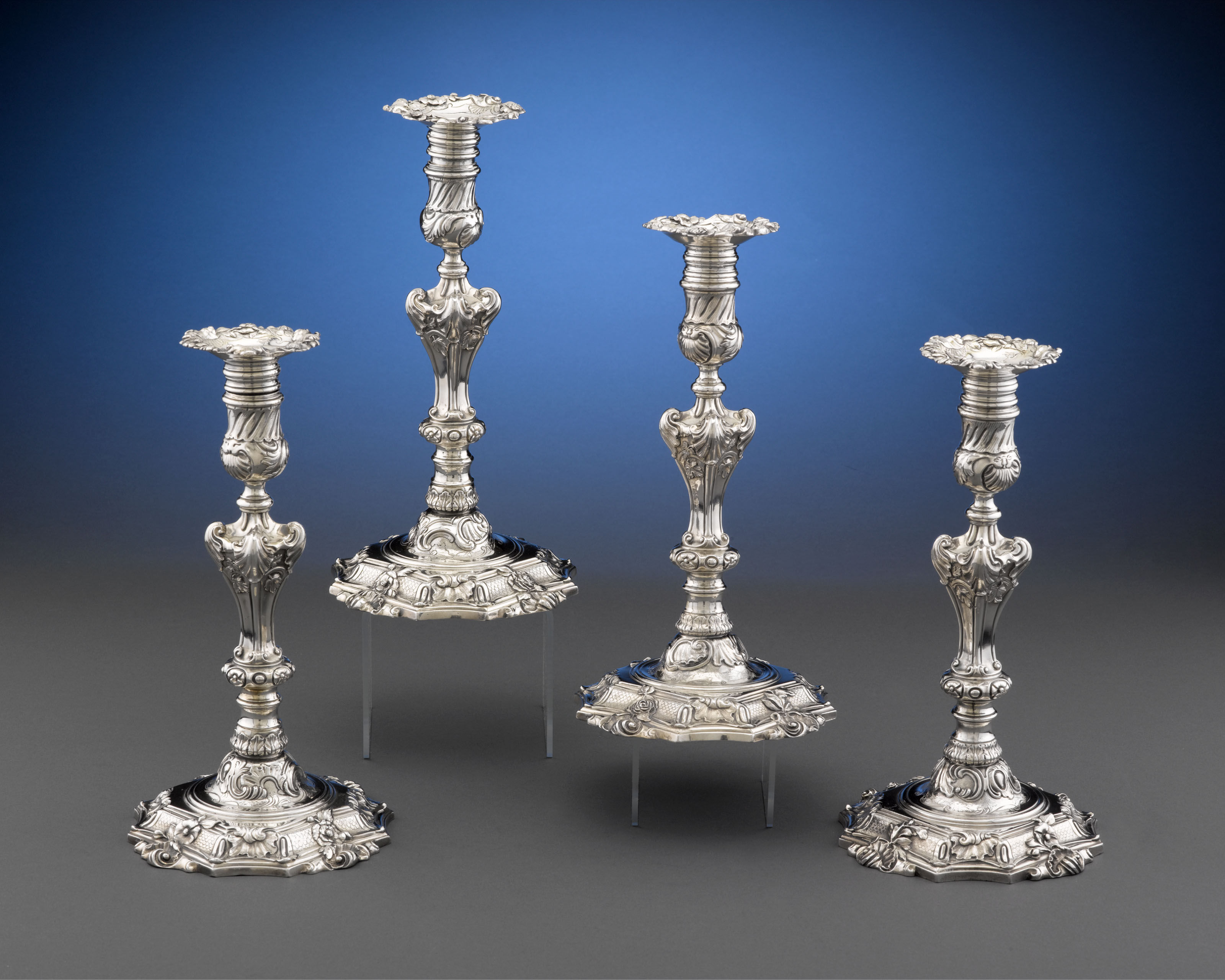
Silver Candlesticks by Paul de Lamerie. Hallmarked London, circa 1747–49

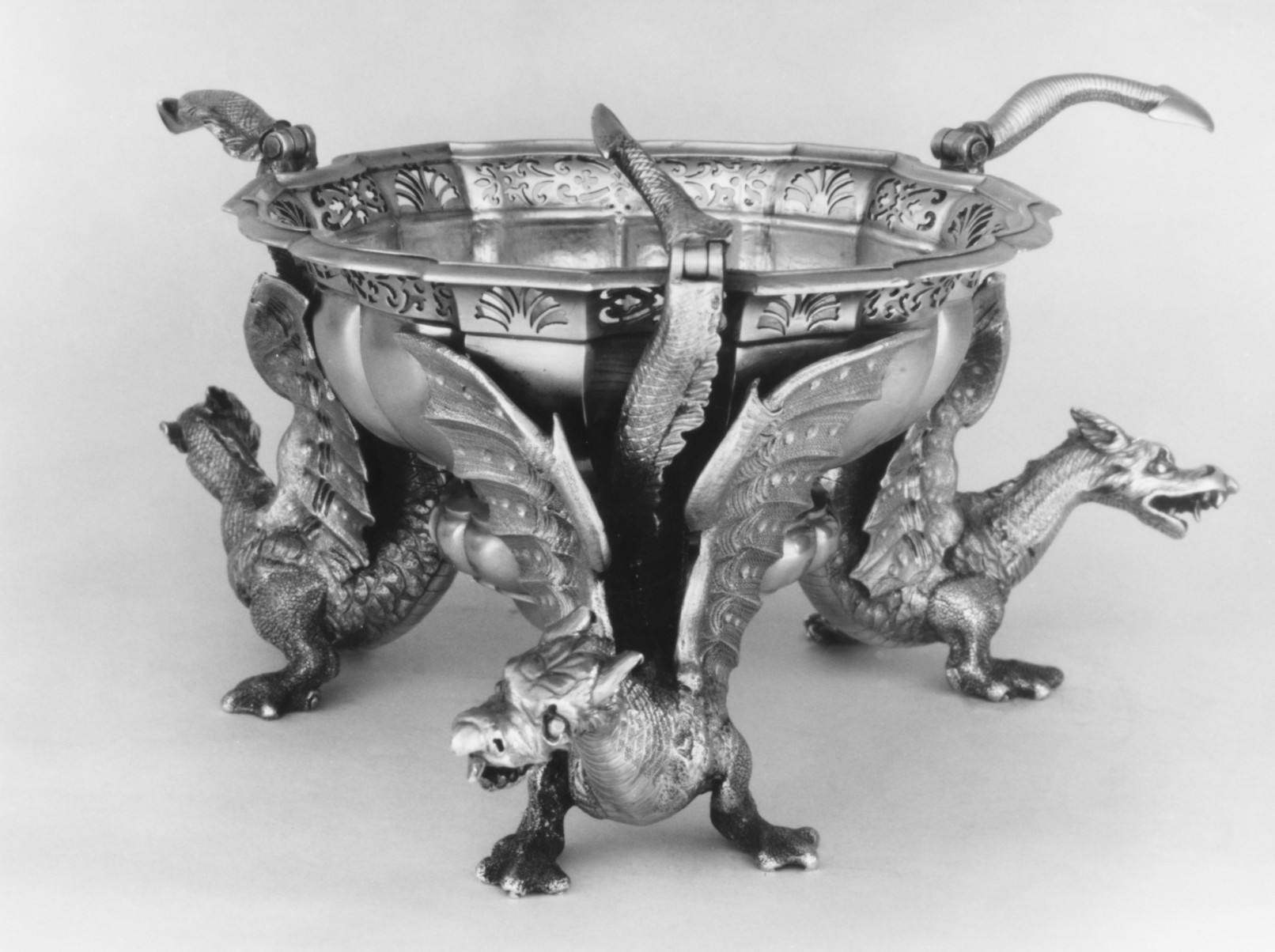
Brazier by silversmith Charles Friedrich Kander (1735), Metropolitan Museum

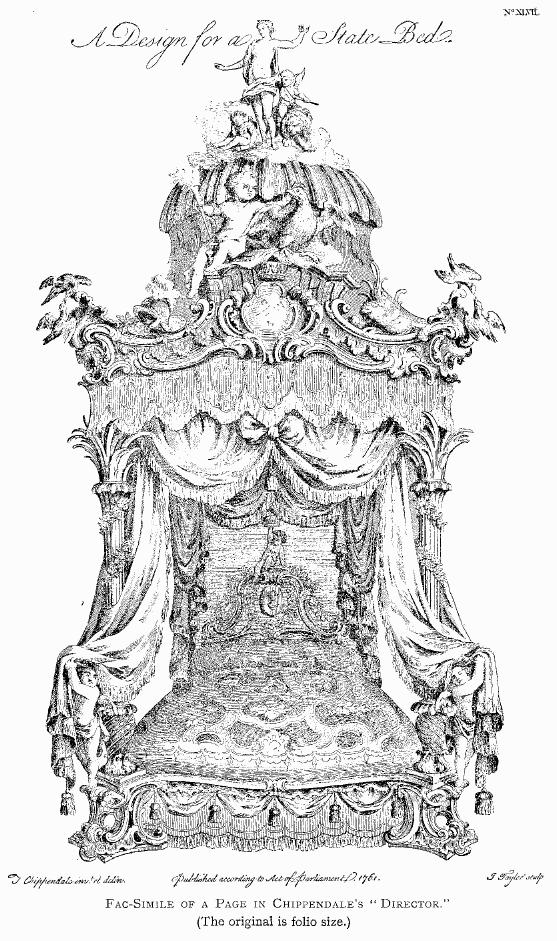
Design for a State Bed by Thomas Chippendale (1753–1754)

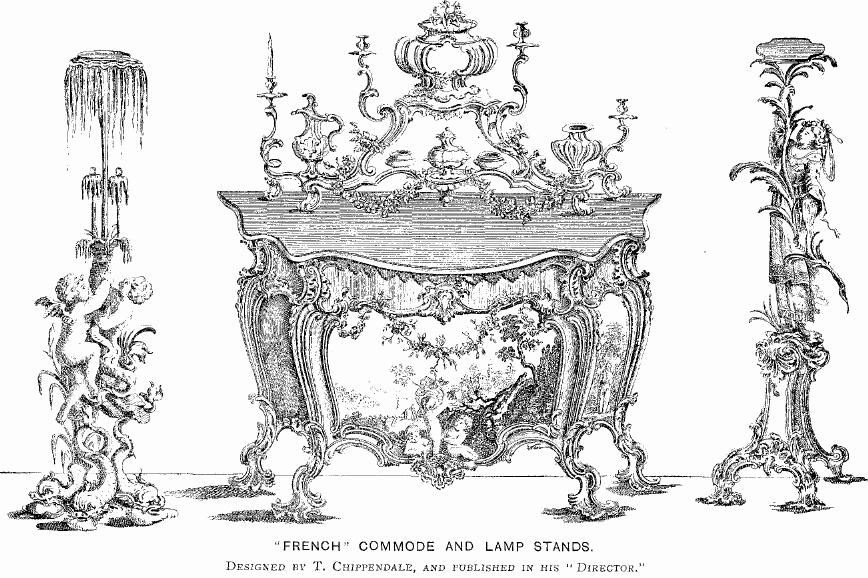
Design for Commode and lamp stands by Thomas Chippendale (1753–1754)

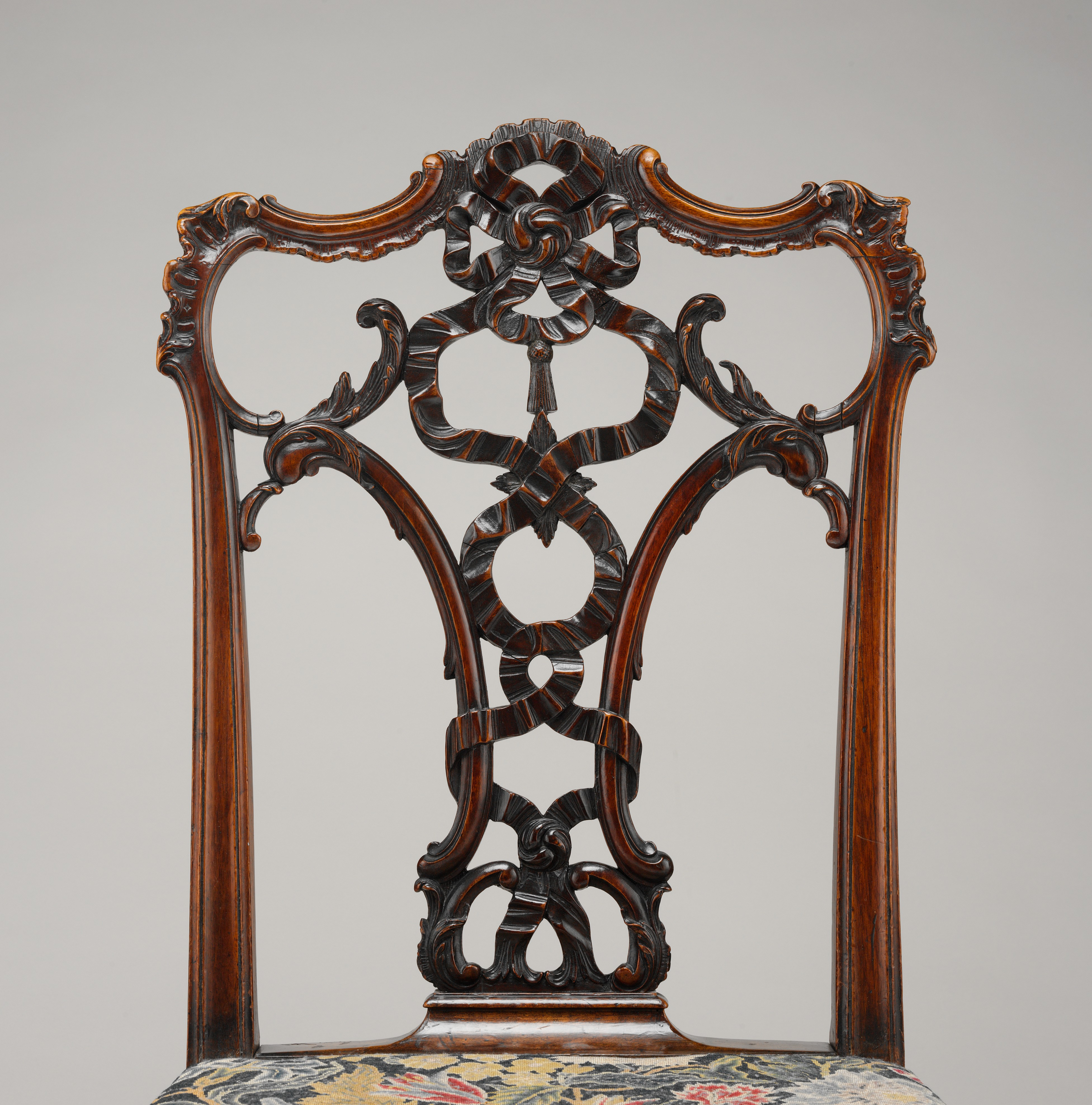
Side chair; Thomas Chippendale; c. 1755 – c. 1760; mahogany; Metropolitan Museum of Art (New York City)

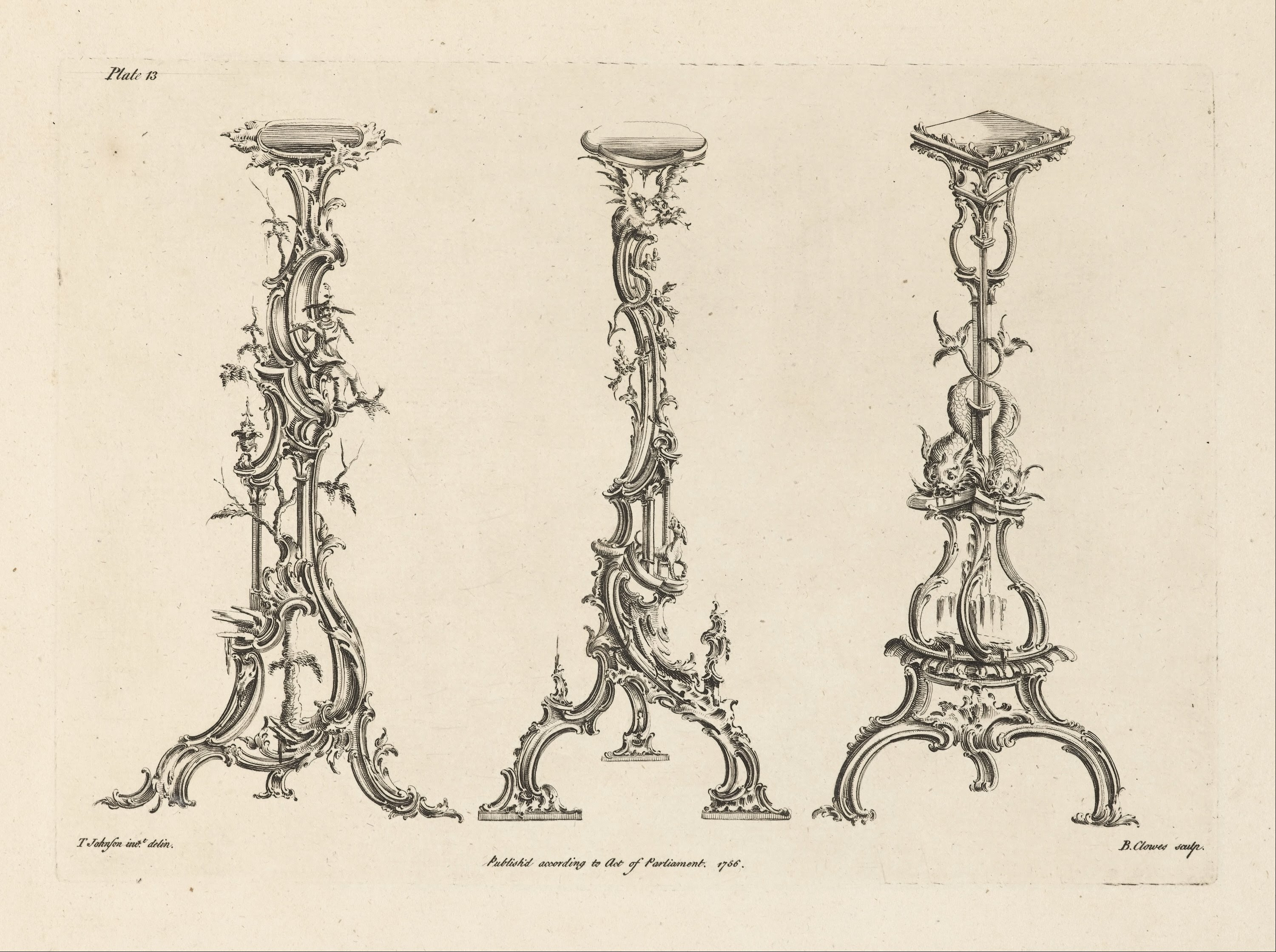
Design for candlesticks in the "Chinese Taste" by Thomas Johnson (1756)

== Russia ==
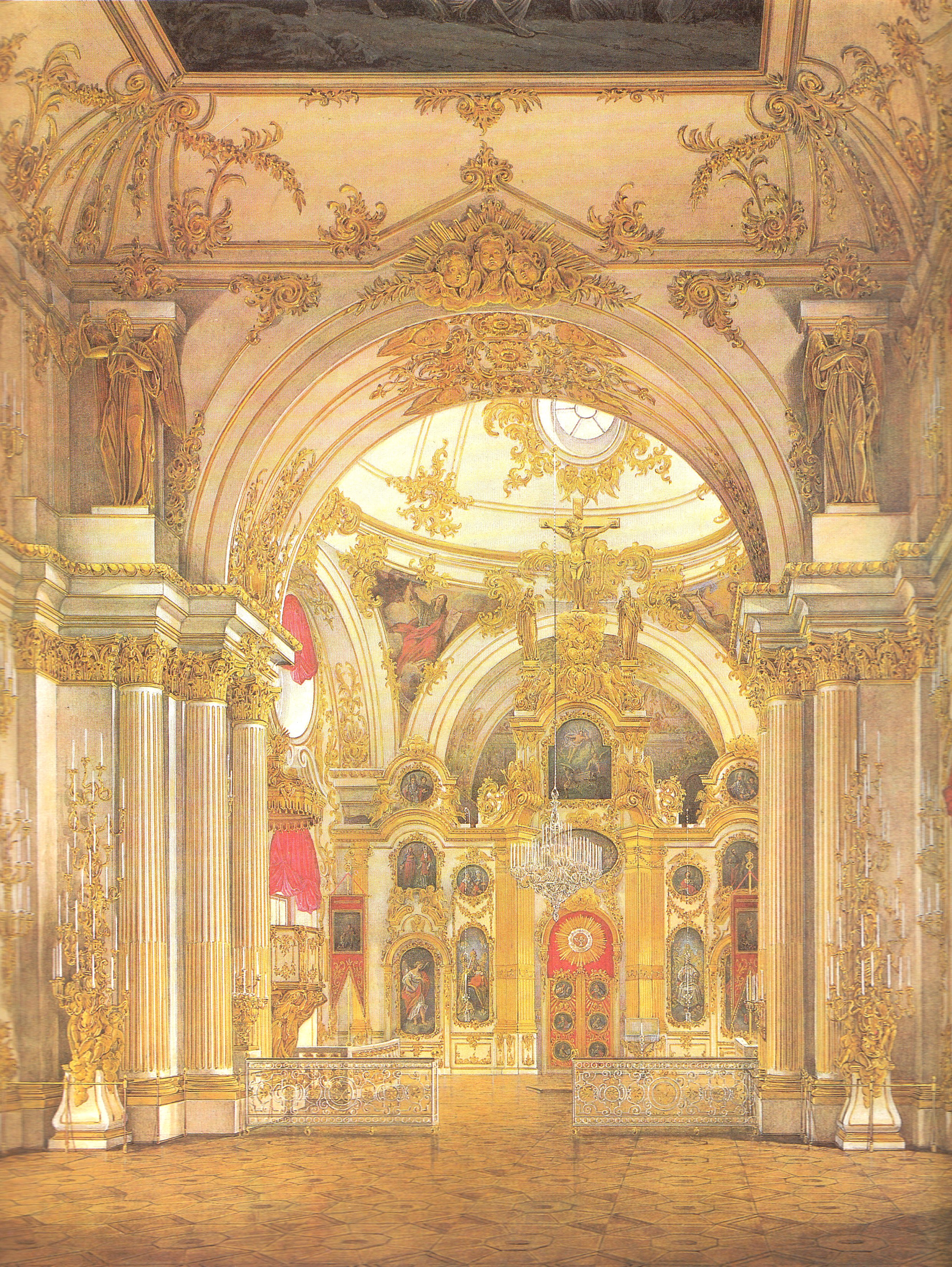
The Winter Palace's Grand Church today retains its original rococo decoration. The onion dome above it is one of the few concessions to an older Russian architecture allowed to be visible from the exterior. Painting by Eduard Hau.

The Russian rococo style was introduced largely by Empress Elisabeth and Catherine the Great during the eighteenth century, by court architects such as Francesco Bartolomeo Rastrelli.

Rastrelli's work at palaces such as the Winter Palace in Saint Petersburg and the Catherine Palace in Tsarskoye Selo incorporated many features of western European rococo architecture, including grand rooms ornamented with gold leaf, mirrors, and large windows for natural light on the interiors, and soft pastel colours framed with large hooded windows and cornices on the exteriors featuring rocaille motifs, such as asymmetrical shells and rocks. Plafonds often featured rococo scrollwork surrounding allegorical paintings of ancient Greek and Roman gods and goddesses. Flooring was often inlaid with parquetry formed from different woods to create elaborate designs in the woodwork.

Russian orthodox church architecture was also heavily influenced by rococo designs during the eighteenth century, often featuring a square Greek cross design with four equidistant wings. Exteriors were painted in light pastel colours such as blues and pinks, and bell towers were often topped with gilded onion domes.

== Frederician Rococo ==
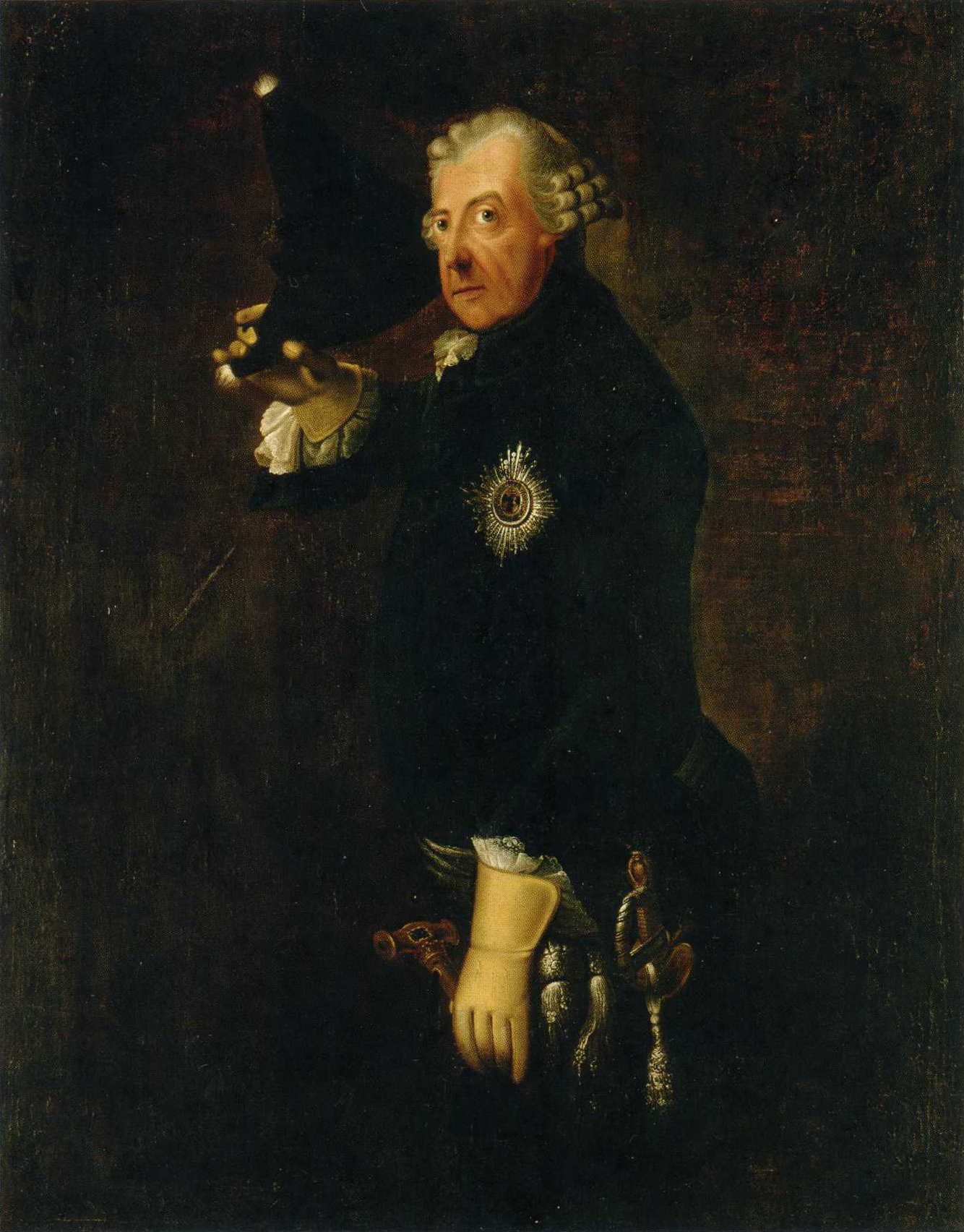
Frederick the Great, from Johann H. C. Franke, about 1781

Frederician Rococo is a form of Rococo which developed in Prussia during the reign of Frederick the Great and combined influences from France, Germany (especially Saxony) and the Netherlands. Its most famous adherent was the architect Georg Wenzeslaus von Knobelsdorff. Furthermore, the painter Antoine Pesne and even King Frederick himself influenced Knobelsdorff's designs. Famous buildings in the Frederician style include Sanssouci Palace, the Potsdam City Palace, and parts of Charlottenburg Palace.

== Decline and end ==
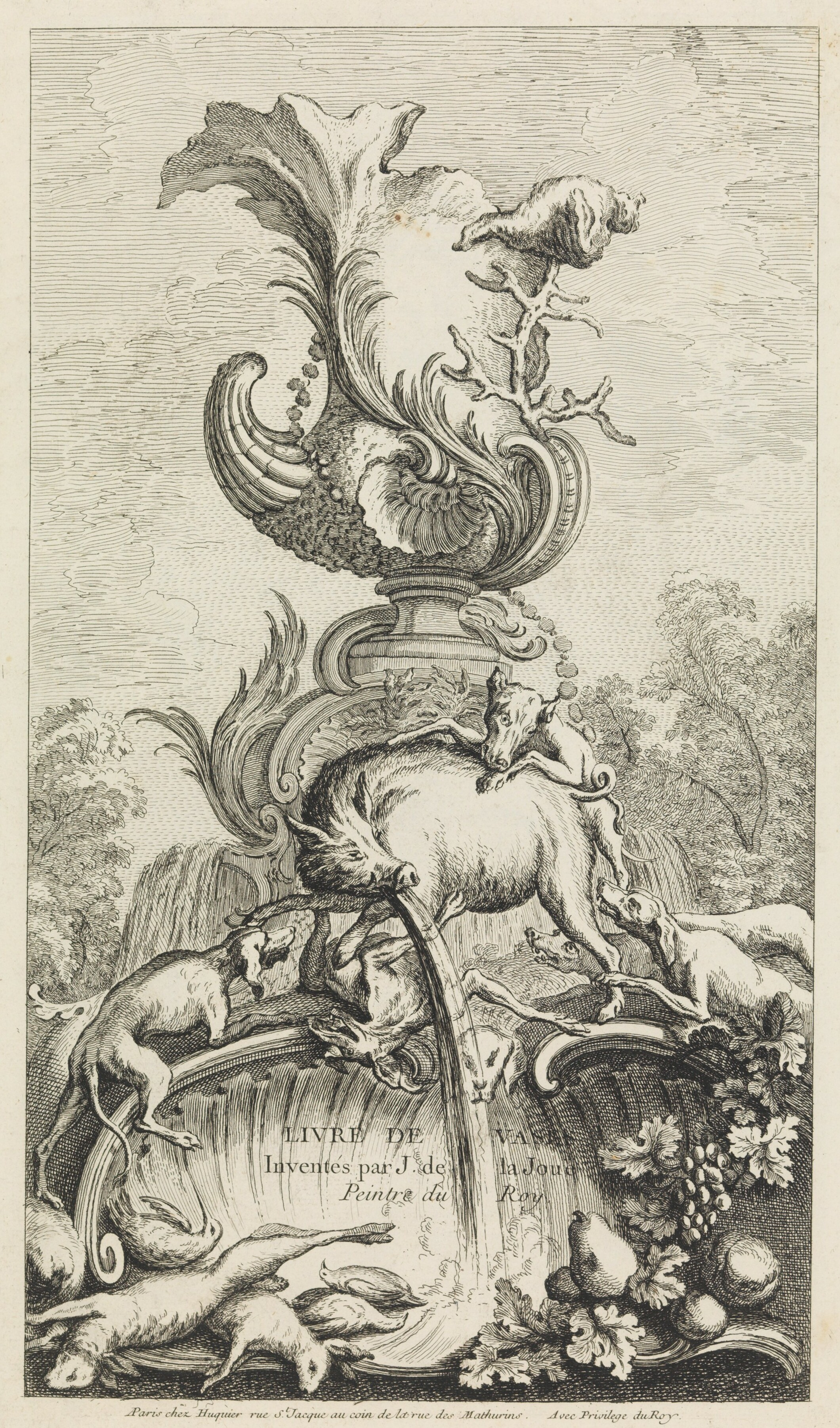
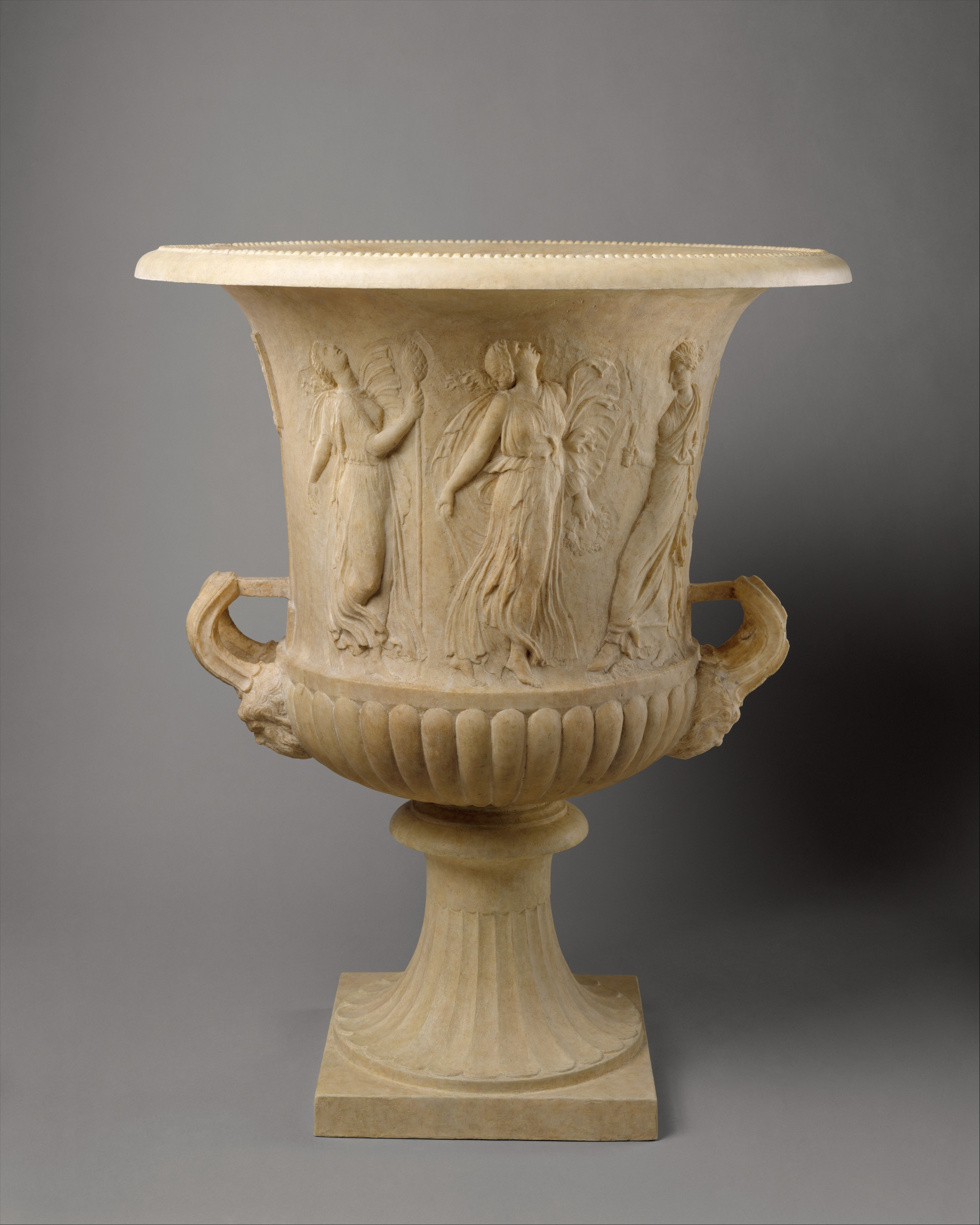
Comparison between an 18th century etching, by Jacques de Lajoue, of a Rococo calyx krater; and a 1st century Roman calyx krater which has exactly the same shape as a Neoclassical stone garden vase

The art of François Boucher and other painters of the period, with its emphasis on decorative mythology and gallantry, soon inspired a reaction, and a demand for more "noble" themes. While the Rococo continued in Germany and Austria, the French Academy in Rome began to teach the classic style. This was confirmed by the nomination of Jean François de Troy as director of the academy in 1738, and then in 1751 by Charles-Joseph Natoire.

Madame de Pompadour, the mistress of Louis XV contributed to the decline of the Rococo style. In 1750 she sent her brother, Abel-François Poisson de Vandières, on a two-year mission to study artistic and archaeological developments in Italy. He was accompanied by several artists, including the engraver Charles-Nicolas Cochin and the architect Soufflot. They returned to Paris with a passion for classical art. Vandières became the Marquis of Marigny, and was named director general of the King's Buildings. He turned official French architecture toward the neoclassical. Cochin became an important art critic; he denounced the petit style of Boucher, and called for a grand style with a new emphasis on antiquity and nobility in the academies of painting and architecture.

The beginning of the end for Rococo came in the early 1760s as figures such as Voltaire and Jacques-François Blondel began to voice their criticism of the superficiality and degeneracy of the art. Blondel decried the "ridiculous jumble of shells, dragons, reeds, palm-trees and plants" in contemporary interiors.

By 1785, Rococo had passed out of fashion in France, replaced by the order and seriousness of Neoclassical artists such as Jacques-Louis David. In Germany, late 18th-century Rococo was ridiculed as Zopf und Perücke ("pigtail and periwig"), and this phase is sometimes referred to as Zopfstil. Rococo remained popular in certain German provincial states and in Italy, until the second phase of neoclassicism, "Empire style", arrived with Napoleonic governments and swept Rococo away.

== Furniture and decoration ==
The ornamental style called rocaille emerged in France between 1710 and 1750, mostly during the regency and reign of Louis XV; the style was also called Louis Quinze. Its principal characteristics were picturesque detail, curves and counter-curves, asymmetry, and a theatrical exuberance. On the walls of new Paris salons, the twisting and winding designs, usually made of gilded or painted stucco, wound around the doorways and mirrors like vines. One of the earliest examples was the Hôtel Soubise in Paris (1704–1705), with its famous oval salon decorated with paintings by Boucher, and Charles-Joseph Natoire.

The best known French furniture designer of the period was Juste-Aurèle Meissonnier (1695–1750), who was also a sculptor, painter. and goldsmith for the royal household. He held the title of official designer to the Chamber and Cabinet of Louis XV. His work is well known today because of the enormous number of engravings made of his work which popularized the style throughout Europe. He designed works for the royal families of Saxony and Portugal.

Italy was another place where the Rococo flourished, both in its early and later phases. Craftsmen in Rome, Milan and Venice all produced lavishly decorated furniture and decorative items.

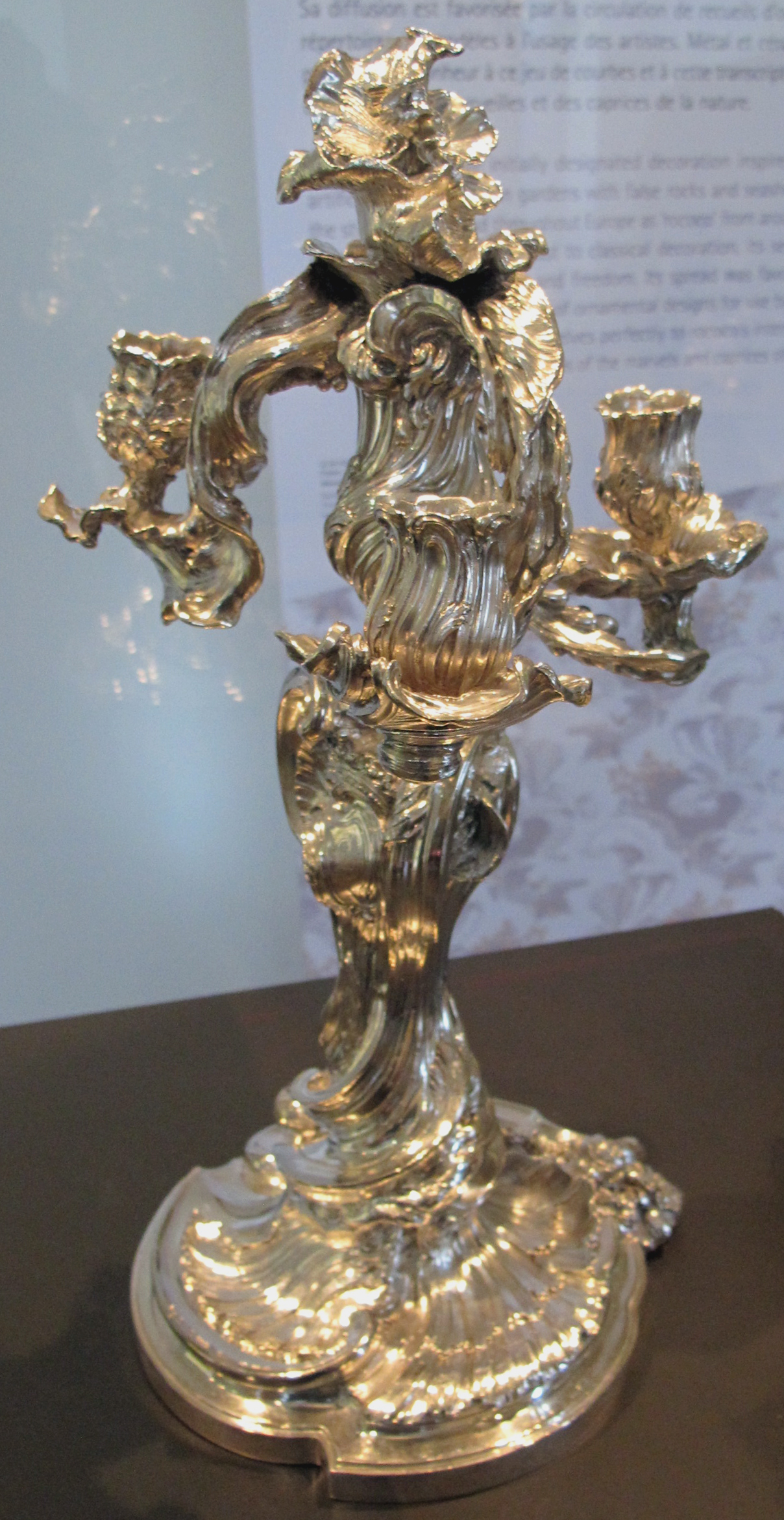
Candelabrum by Juste-Aurèle Meissonnier (1735–1740)

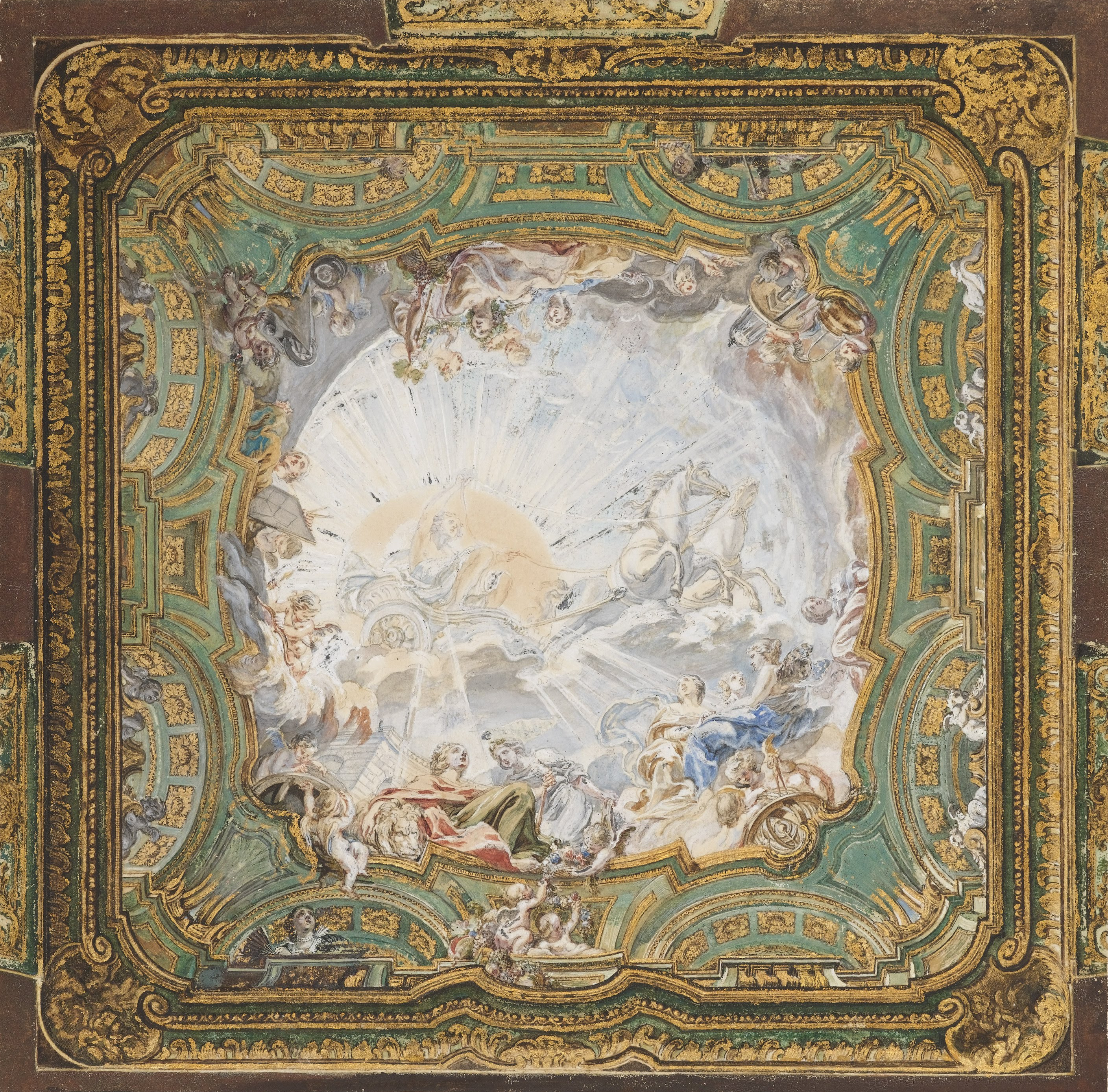
Chariot of Apollo design for a ceiling of Count Bielinski by Meissonier, Warsaw, Poland (1734)

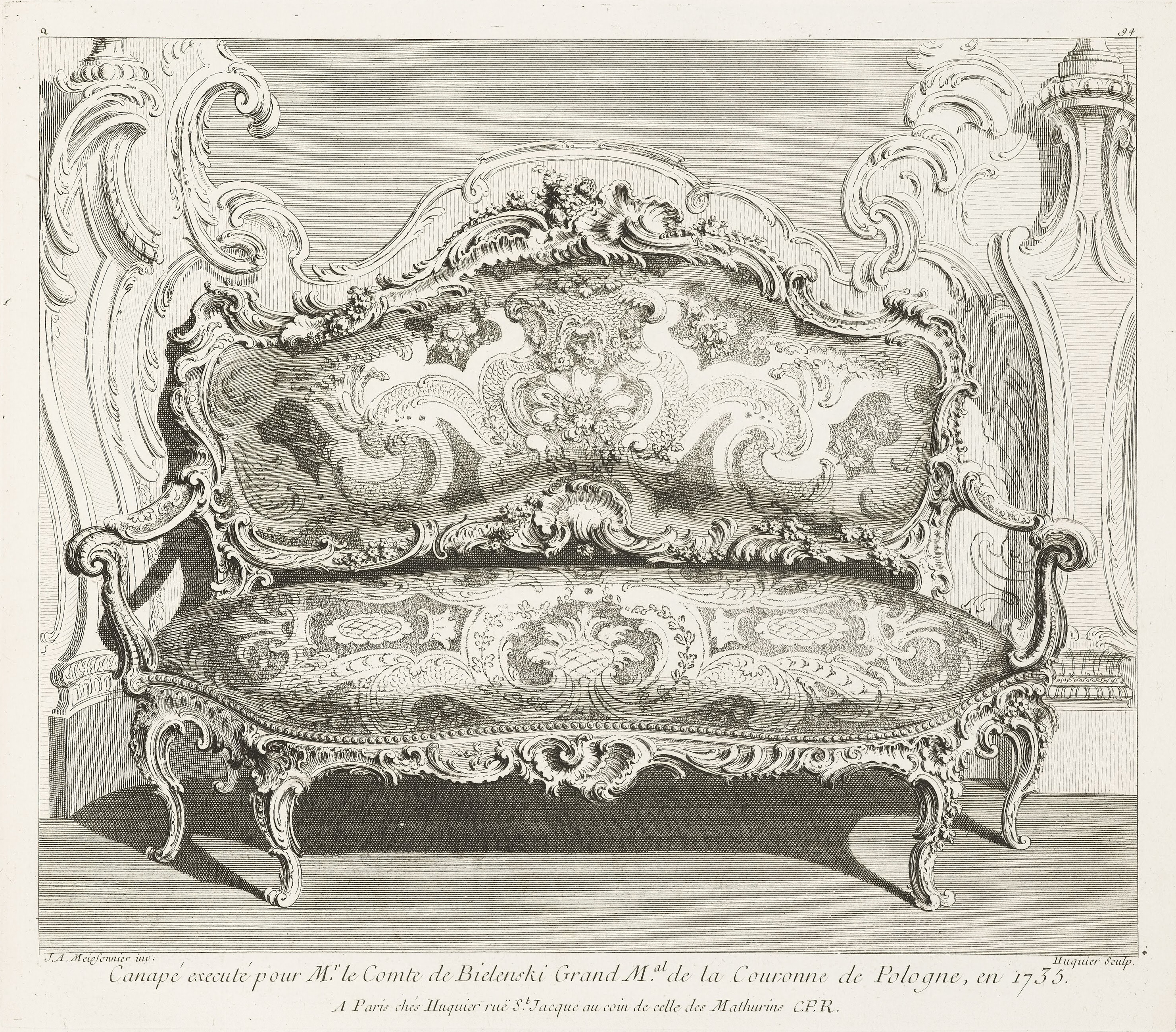
Canapé designed by Meissonnier for Count Bielinski, Warsaw, Poland (1735)

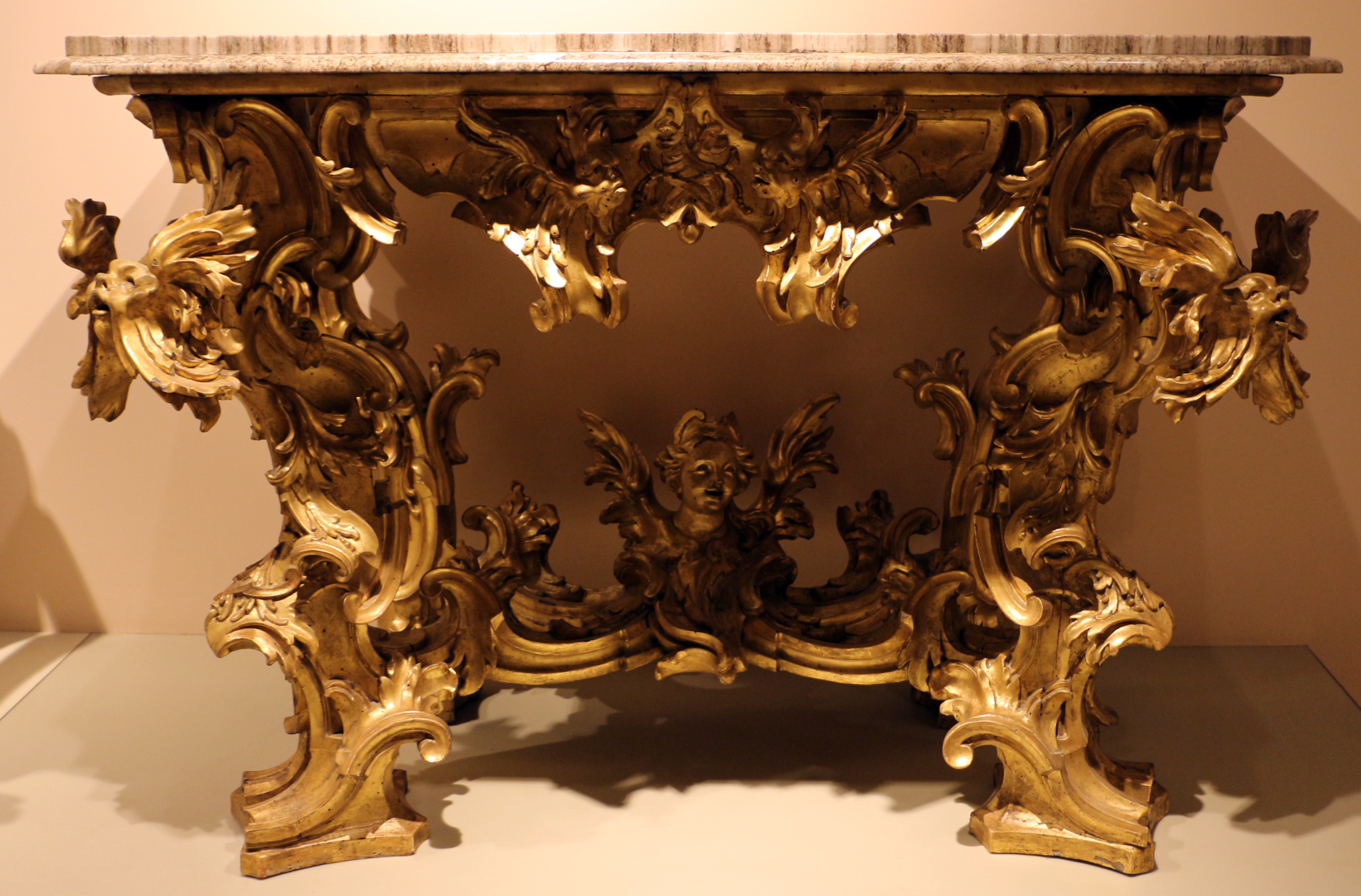
Console table, Rome, Italy (c. 1710)

The sculpted decoration included fleurettes, palmettes, seashells, and foliage, carved in wood. The most extravagant rocaille forms were found in the consoles, tables designed to stand against walls. The Commodes, or chests, which had first appeared under Louis XIV, were richly decorated with rocaille ornament made of gilded bronze. They were made by master craftsmen including Jean-Pierre Latz and also featured marquetry of different-coloured woods, sometimes placed in draughtsboard cubic patterns, made with light and dark woods. The period also saw the arrival of Chinoiserie, often in the form of lacquered and gilded commodes, called falcon de Chine of Vernis Martin, after the ebenist who introduced the technique to France. Ormolu, or gilded bronze, was used by master craftsmen including Jean-Pierre Latz. Latz made a particularly ornate clock mounted atop a cartonnier for Frederick the Great for his palace in Potsdam. Pieces of imported Chinese porcelain were often mounted in ormolu (gilded bronze) rococo settings for display on tables or consoles in salons. Other craftsmen imitated Japanese lacquered furniture, and produced commodes with Japanese motifs.

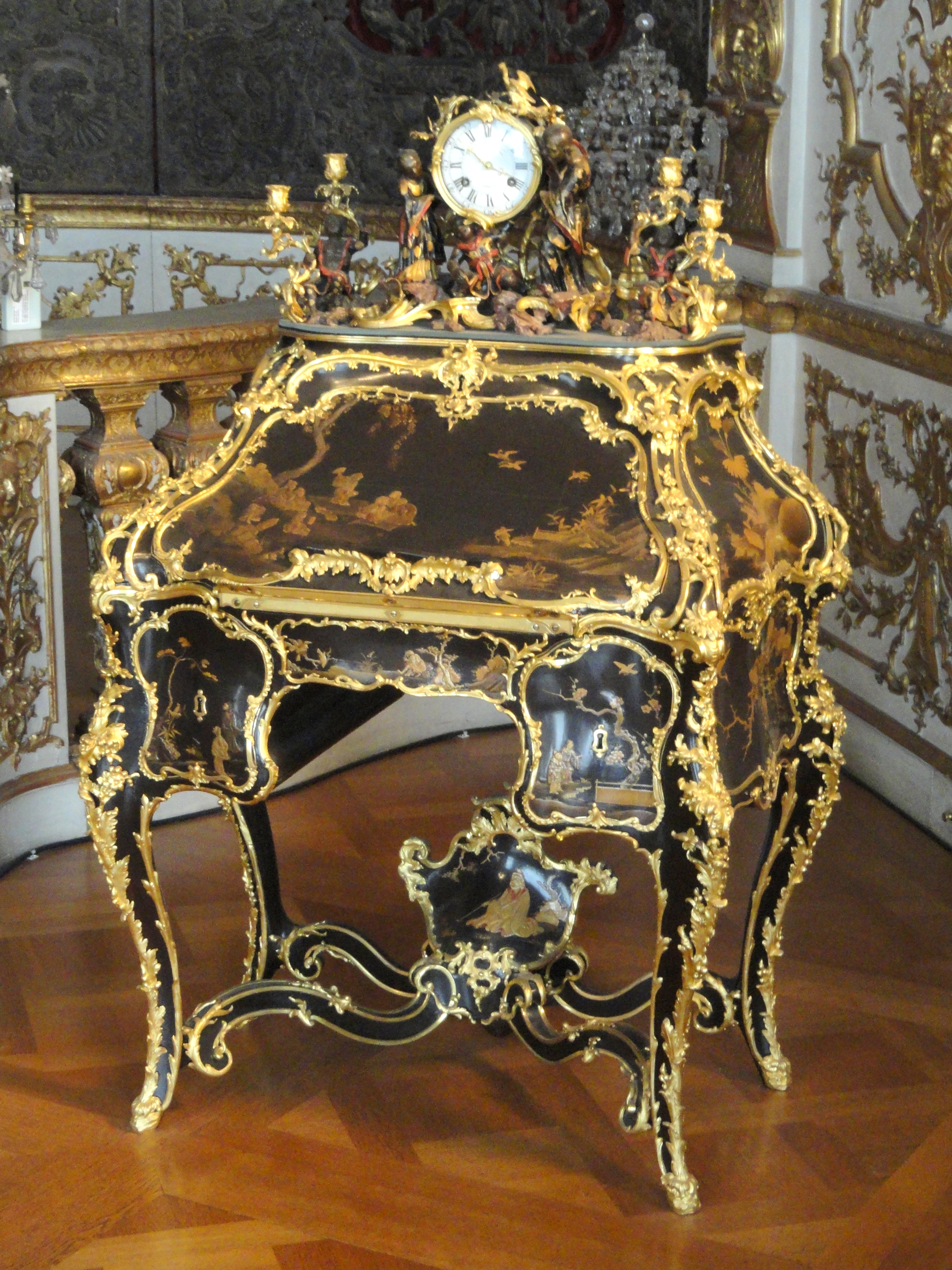
Desk for the Munich Residenz by Bernard II van Risamburgh (1737)

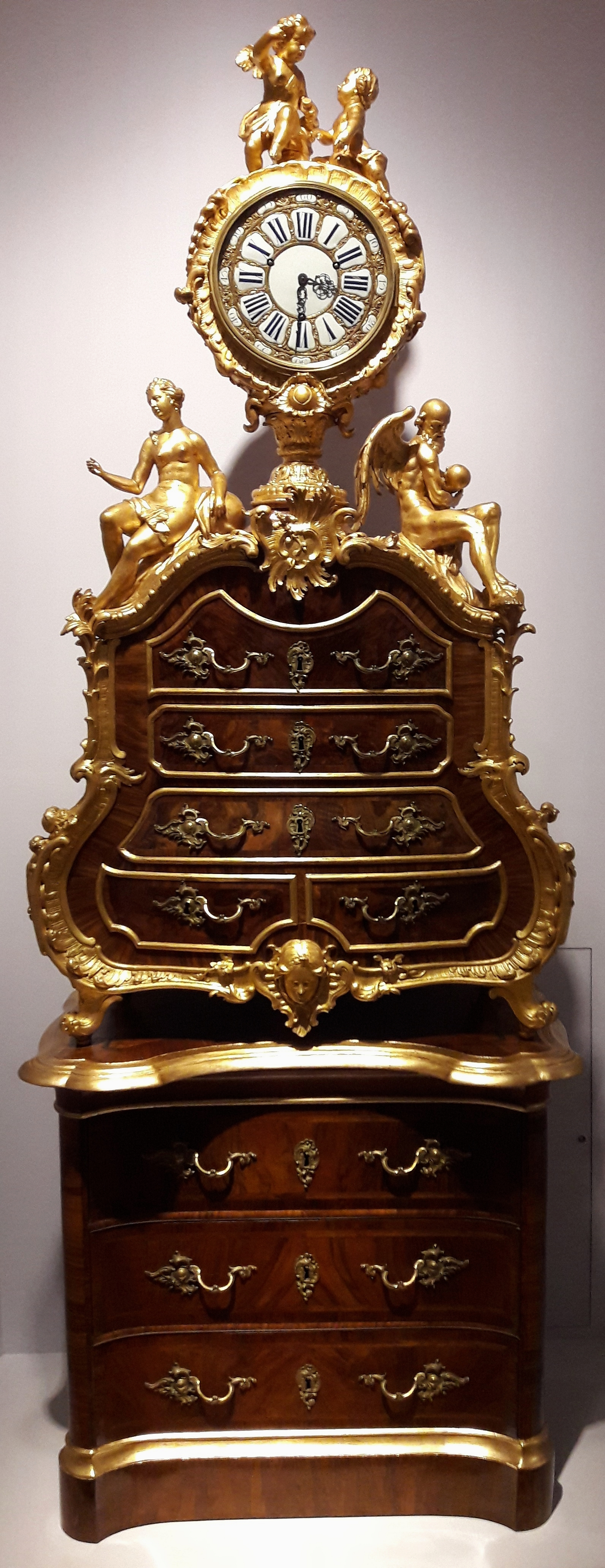
Clock-chest for Frederick the Great (1742)

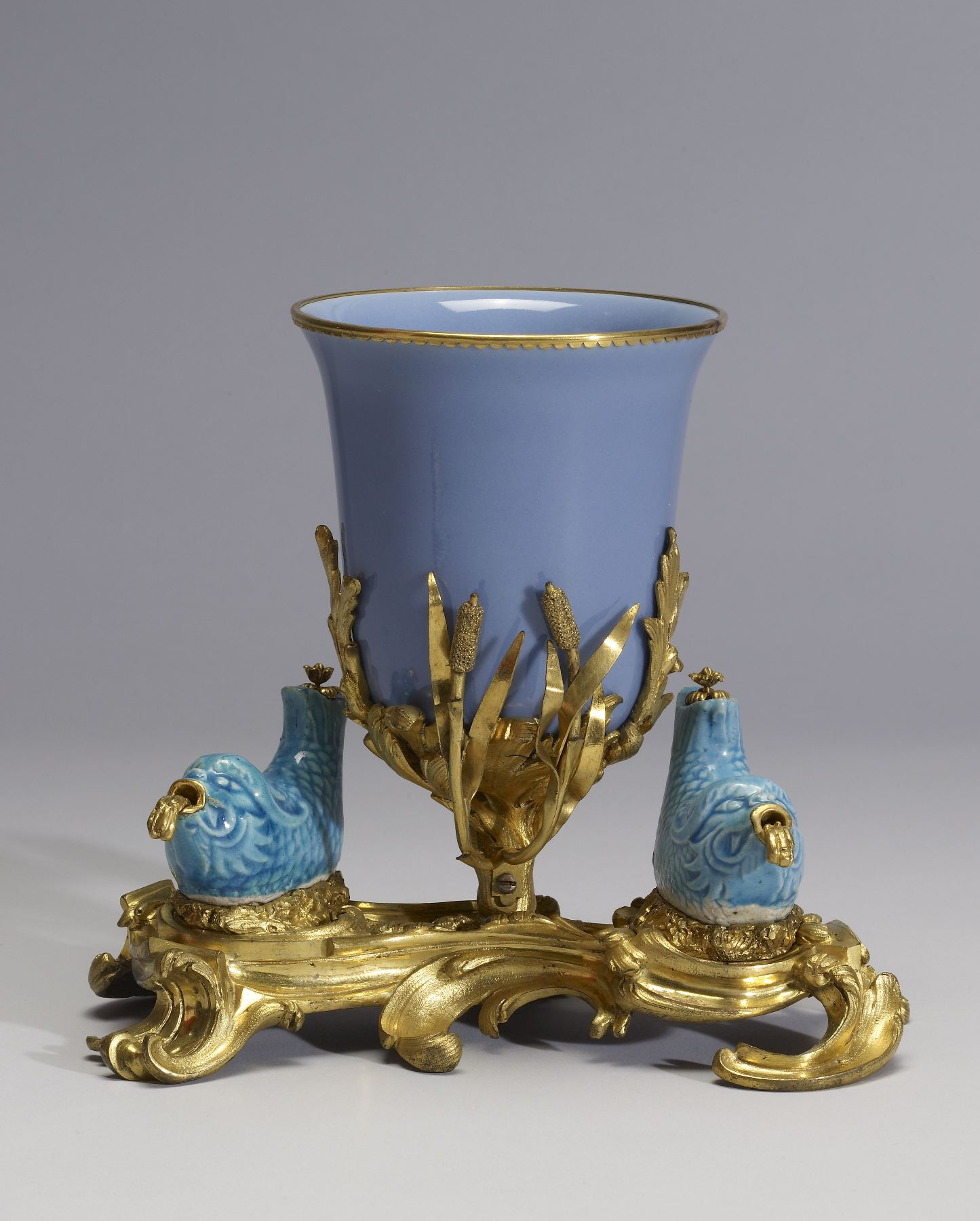
A Chinese porcelain bowl and two fish mounted in gilded bronze, France (1745–1749)

An encoignure by royal cabinetmaker Jean-Pierre Latz (c. 1750)

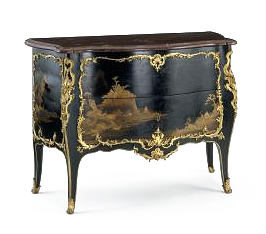
Lacquered Commode in Chinoiserie style, by Bernard II van Risamburgh, Victoria and Albert Museum (1750–1760)

British Rococo tended to be more restrained. Thomas Chippendale's furniture designs kept the curves and feel, but stopped short of the French heights of whimsy. The most successful exponent of British Rococo was probably Thomas Johnson, a gifted carver and furniture designer working in London in the mid-18th century.

== Painting ==
Elements of the Rocaille style appeared in the work of some French painters, including a taste for the picturesque in details; curves and counter-curves; and dissymmetry which replaced the movement of the baroque with exuberance, though the French rocaille never reached the extravagance of the Germanic rococo. The leading proponent was Antoine Watteau, particularly in The Embarkation for Cythera (1717), Louvre, in a genre called Fête galante depicting scenes of young nobles gathered together to celebrate in a pastoral setting. Watteau died in 1721 at the age of thirty-seven, but his work continued to have influence through the rest of the century. A version of Watteau's painting titled Pilgrimage to Cythera was purchased by Frederick the Great of Prussia in 1752 or 1765 to decorate his palace of Charlottenburg in Berlin.

The successor of Watteau and the Féte Galante in decorative painting was François Boucher (1703–1770), the favorite painter of Madame de Pompadour. His work included the sensual Toilette de Venus (1746), which became one of the best known examples of the style. Boucher participated in all of the genres of the time, designing tapestries, models for porcelain sculpture, set decorations for the Paris Opera and Opéra-Comique, and decor for the Fair of Saint-Laurent. Other important painters of the Fête Galante style included Nicolas Lancret and Jean-Baptiste Pater. The style particularly influenced François Lemoyne, who painted the lavish decoration of the ceiling of the Salon of Hercules at the Palace of Versailles, completed in 1735. Paintings with fétes gallant and mythological themes by Boucher, Pierre-Charles Trémolières and Charles-Joseph Natoire decorated the famous salon of the Hôtel Soubise in Paris (1735–1740). Other Rococo painters include: Jean François de Troy (1679–1752), Jean-Baptiste van Loo (1685–1745), his two sons Louis-Michel van Loo (1707–1771) and Charles-Amédée-Philippe van Loo (1719–1795), his younger brother Charles-André van Loo (1705–1765), Nicolas Lancret (1690–1743), and Jean Honoré Fragonard (1732–1806).

In Austria and Southern Germany, Italian painting had the largest effect on the Rococo style. The Venetian painter Giovanni Battista Tiepolo, assisted by his son, Giovanni Domenico Tiepolo, was invited to paint frescoes for the Würzburg Residence (1720–1744). The most prominent painter of Bavarian rococo churches was Johann Baptist Zimmermann, who painted the ceiling of the Wieskirche (1745–1754).

Antoine Watteau, The Embarkation for Cythera (1717)

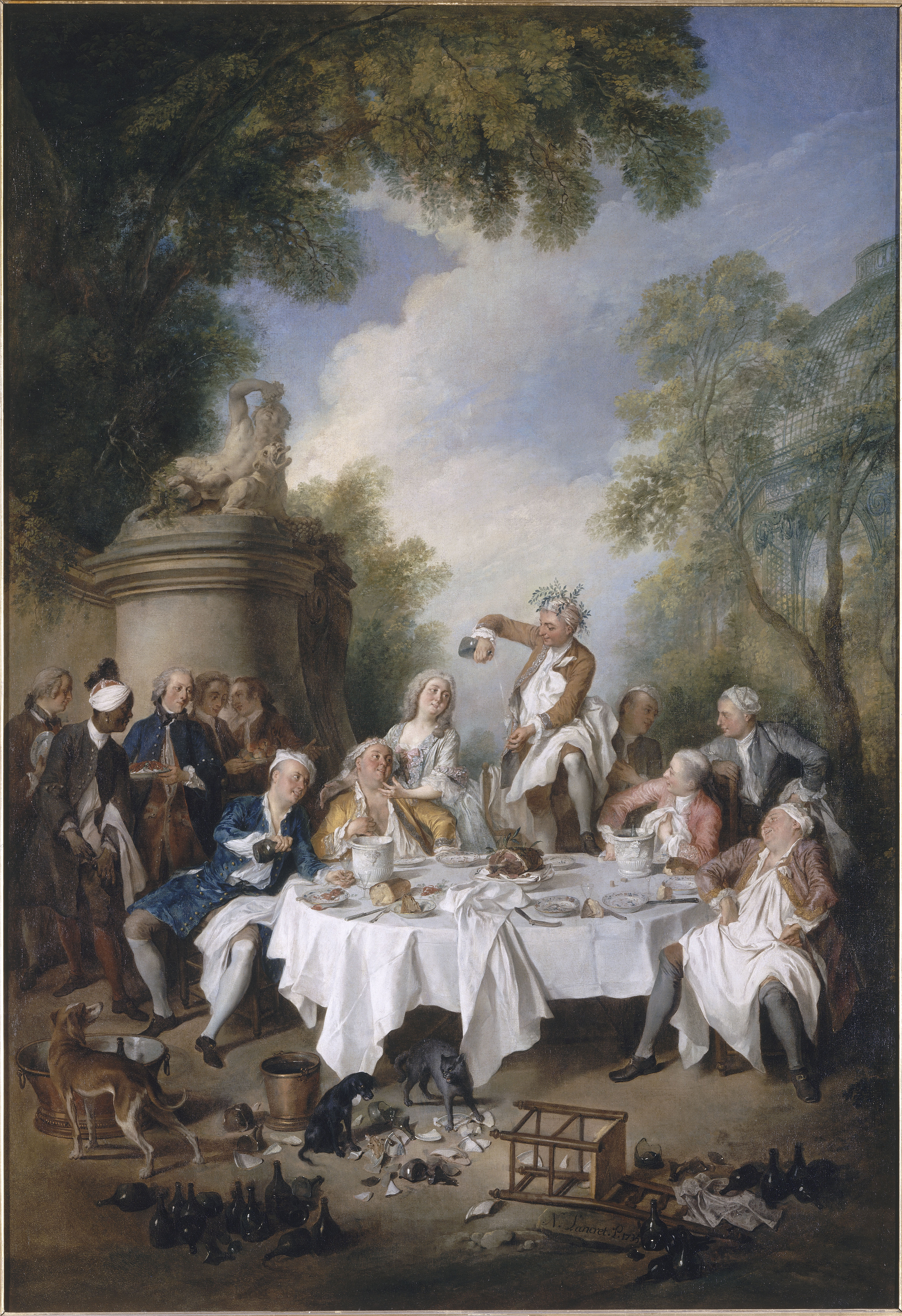
"The Ham Dinner" by Nicolas Lancret (1735)

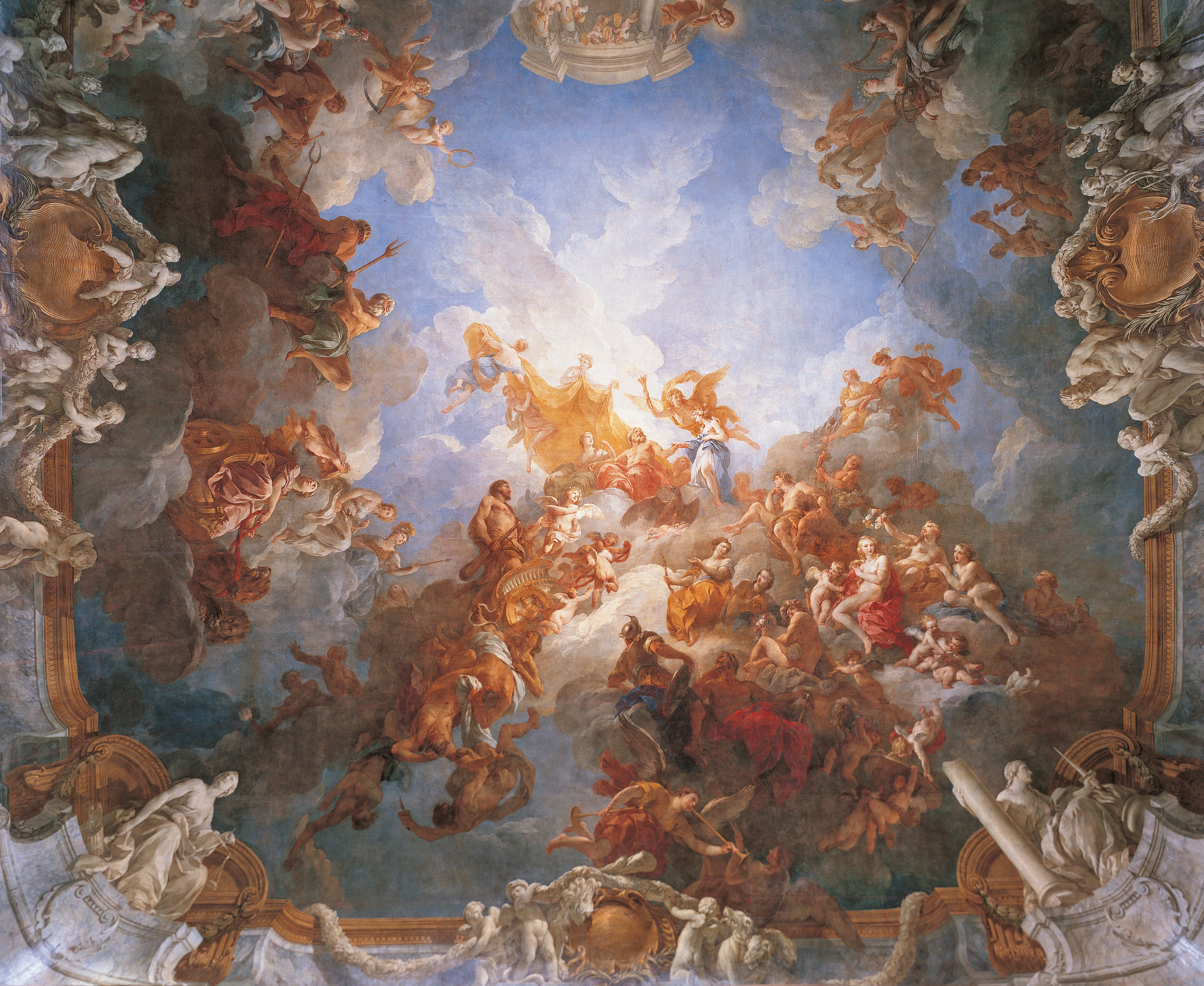
Ceiling of the Salon of Hercules by François Lemoyne (1735)

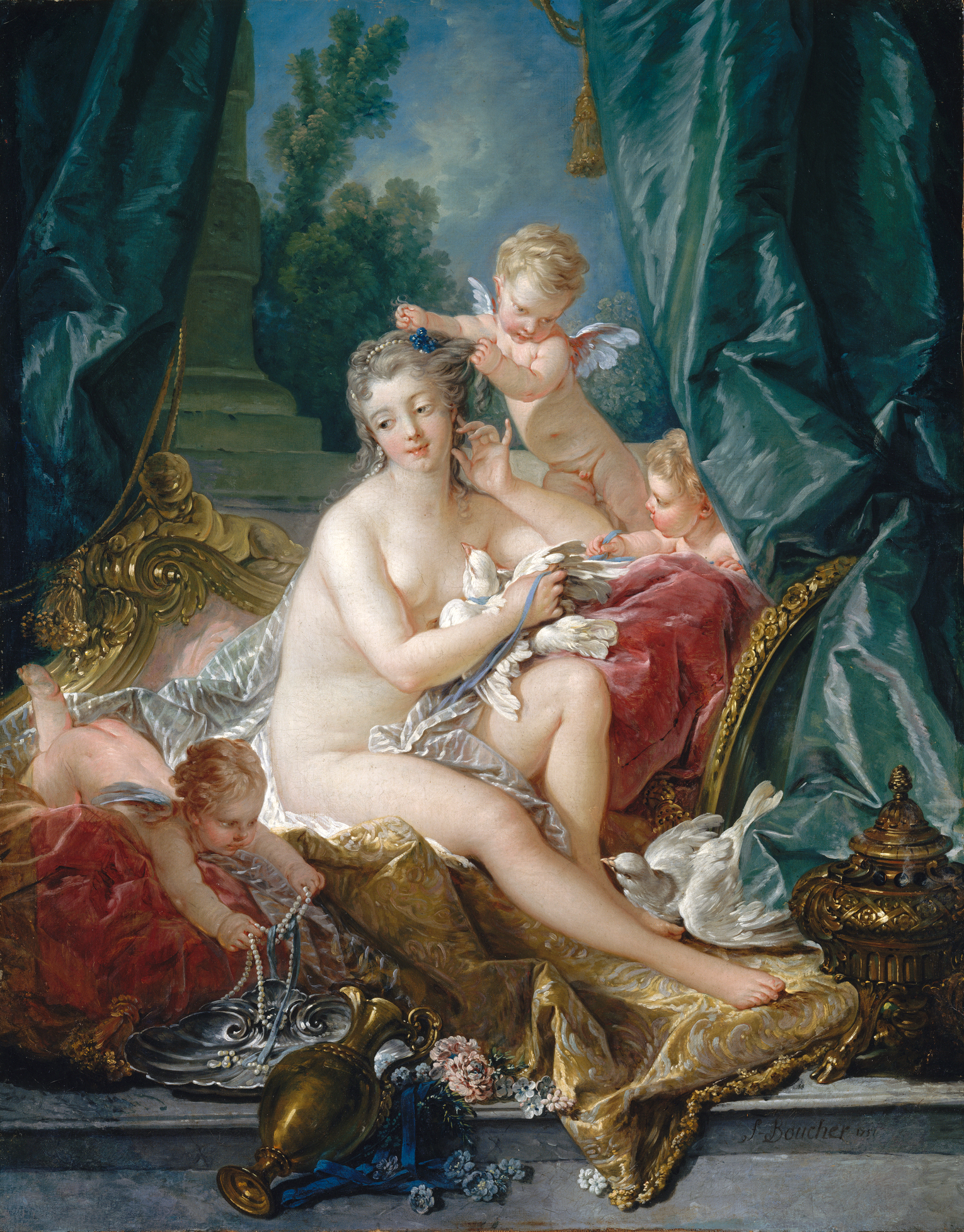
The Toilet of Venus by François Boucher (1746)

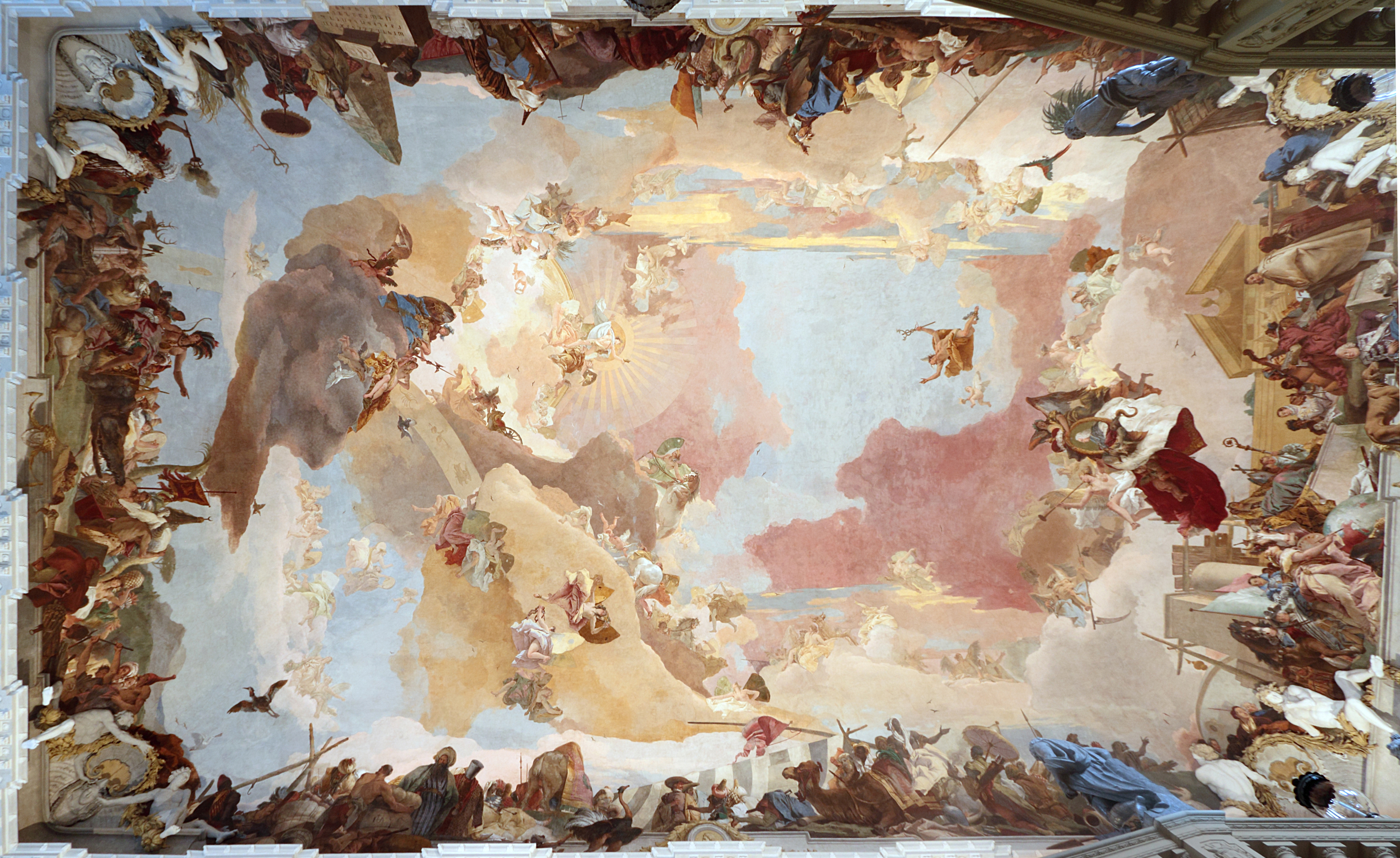
Ceiling fresco in the Würzburg Residence (1720–1744) by Giovanni Battista Tiepolo

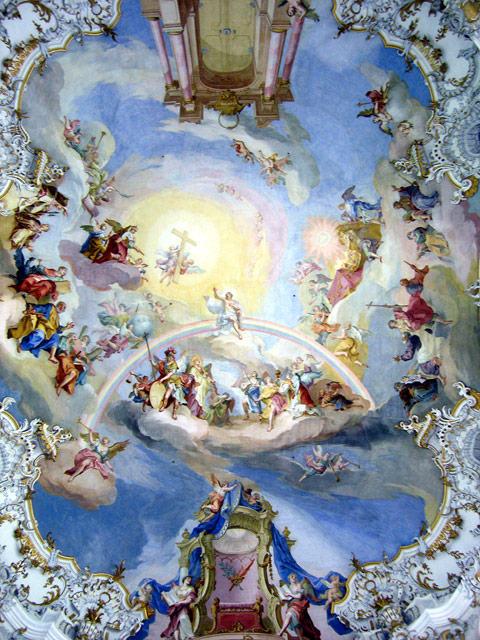
Ceiling of the Wieskirche by Johann Baptist Zimmermann (1745–1754)

== Sculpture ==
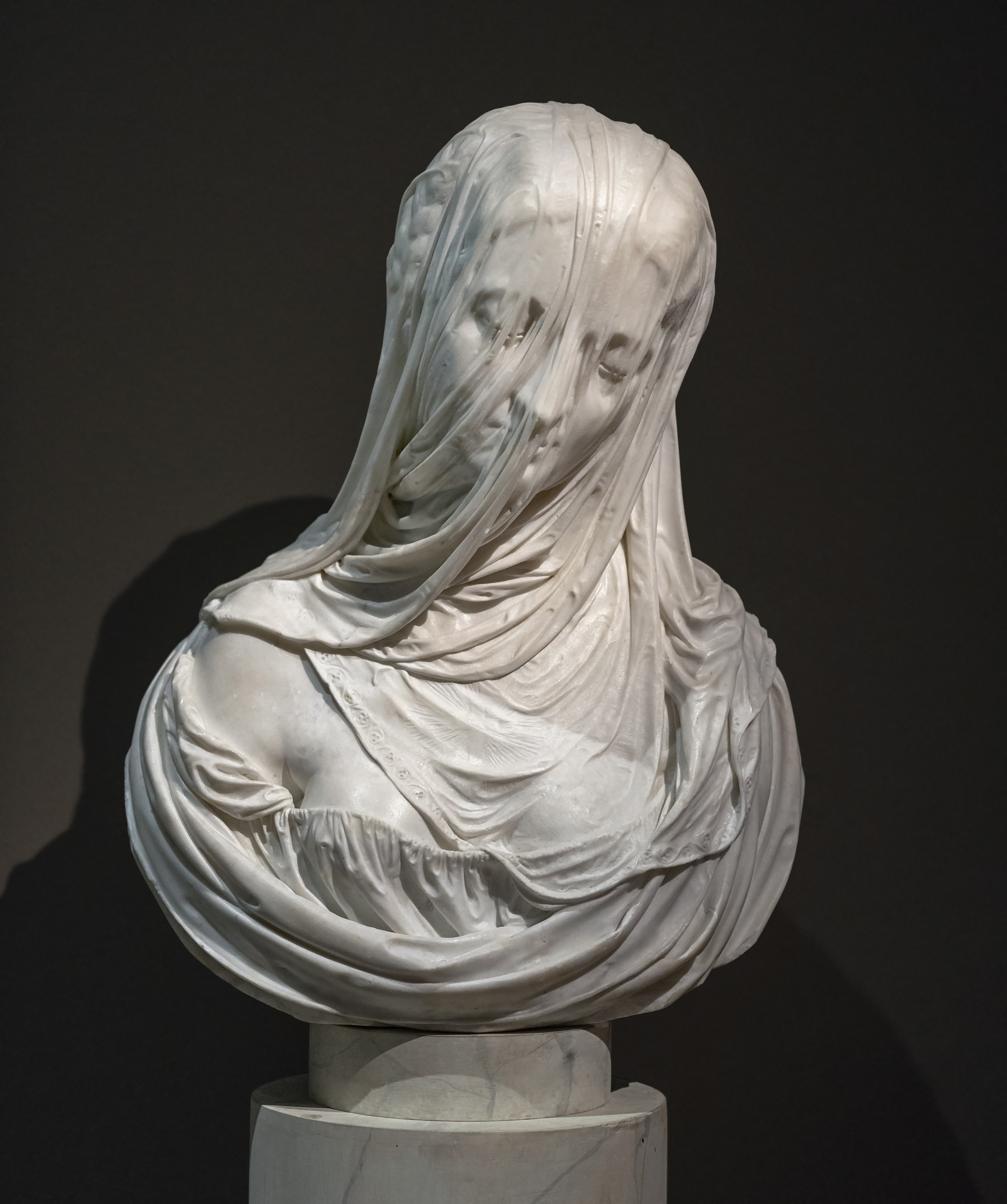
The "Veiled Dame (Puritas) by Antonio Corradini (1722)

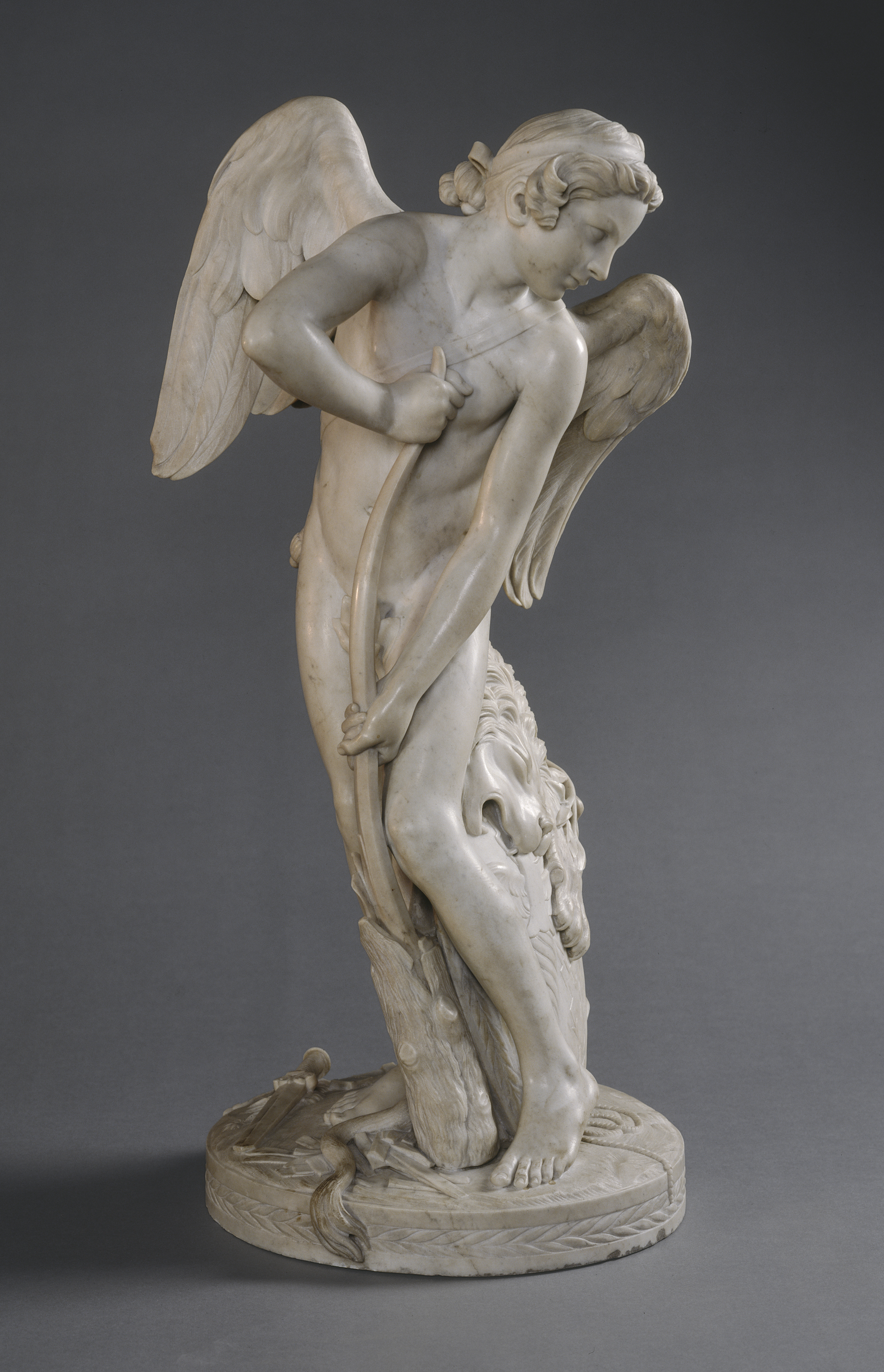
Cupid by Edmé Bouchardon, National Gallery of Art (1744)

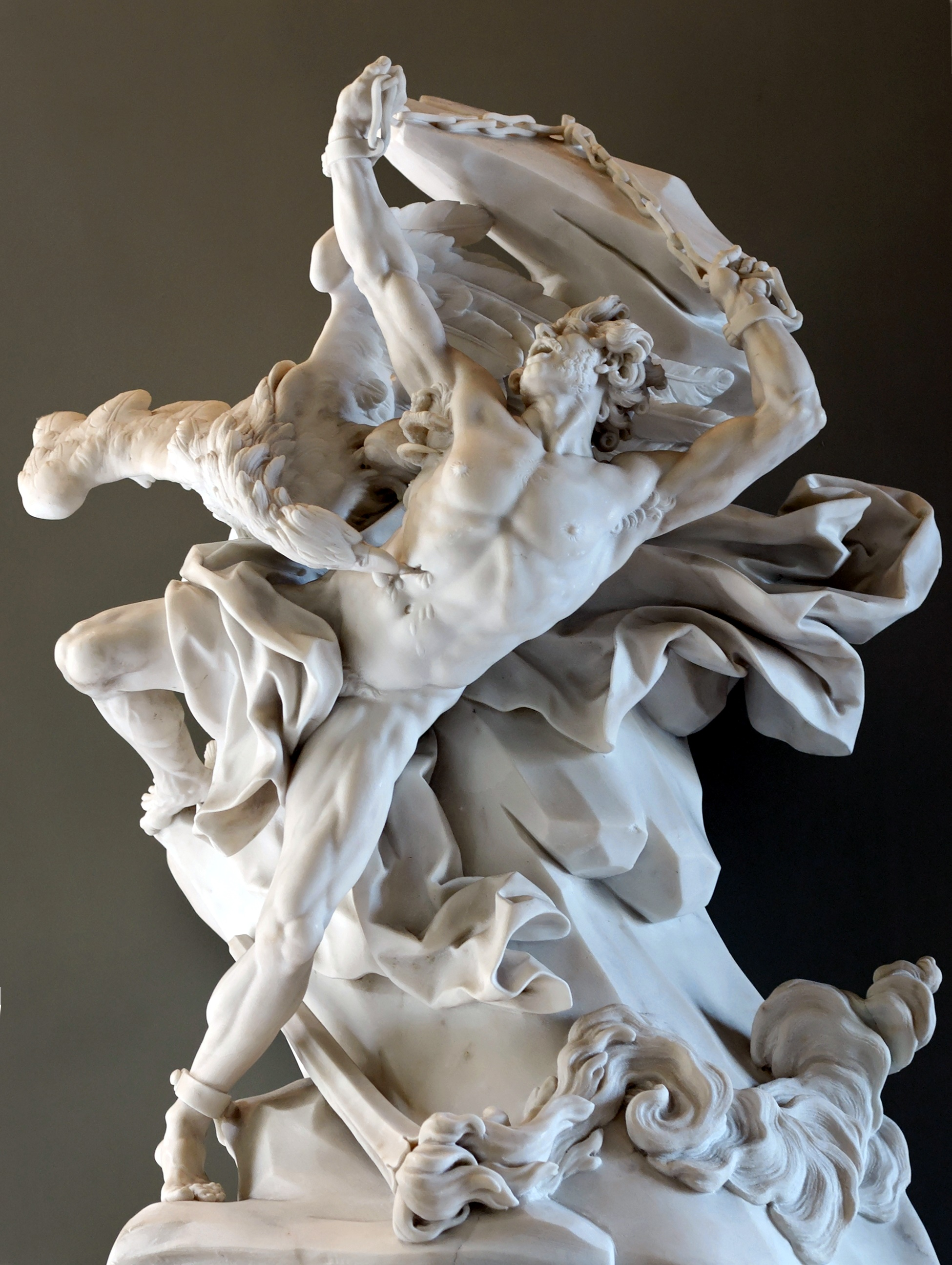
Prometheus by Nicolas-Sébastien Adam (1762)

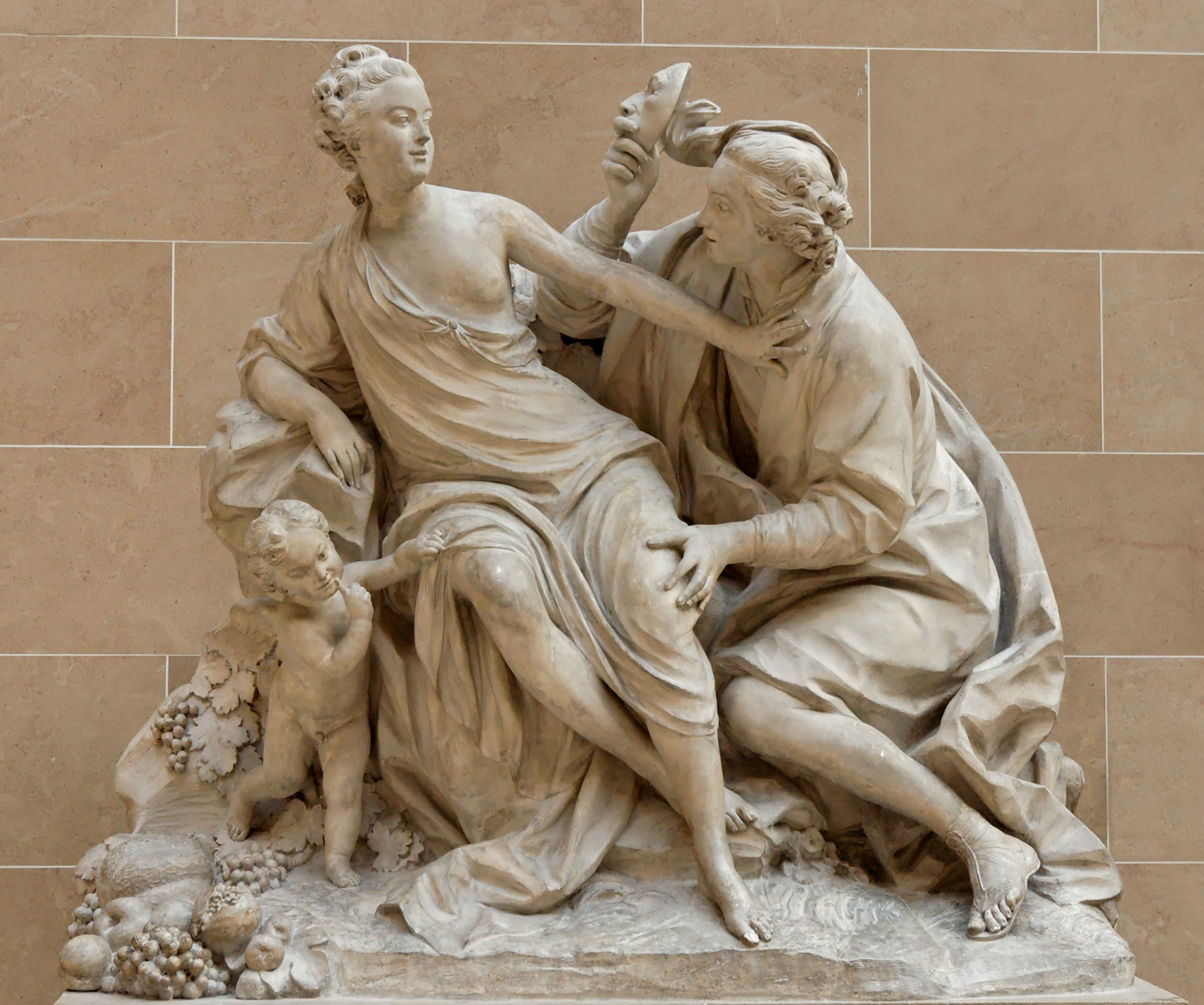
Vertumnus and Pomone by Jean-Baptiste Lemoyne (1760)

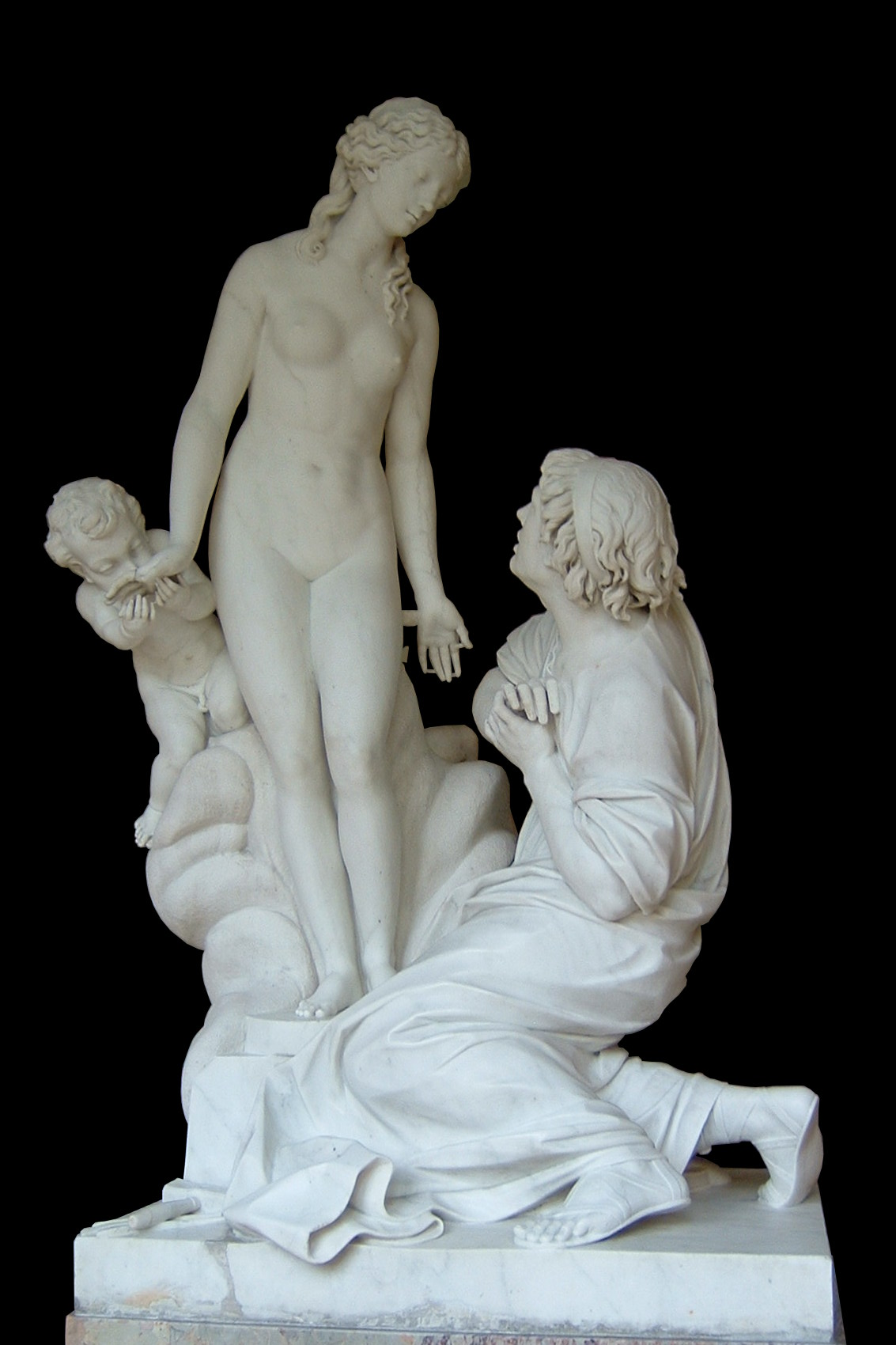
Pygmalion et Galatee by Étienne-Maurice Falconet (1763)

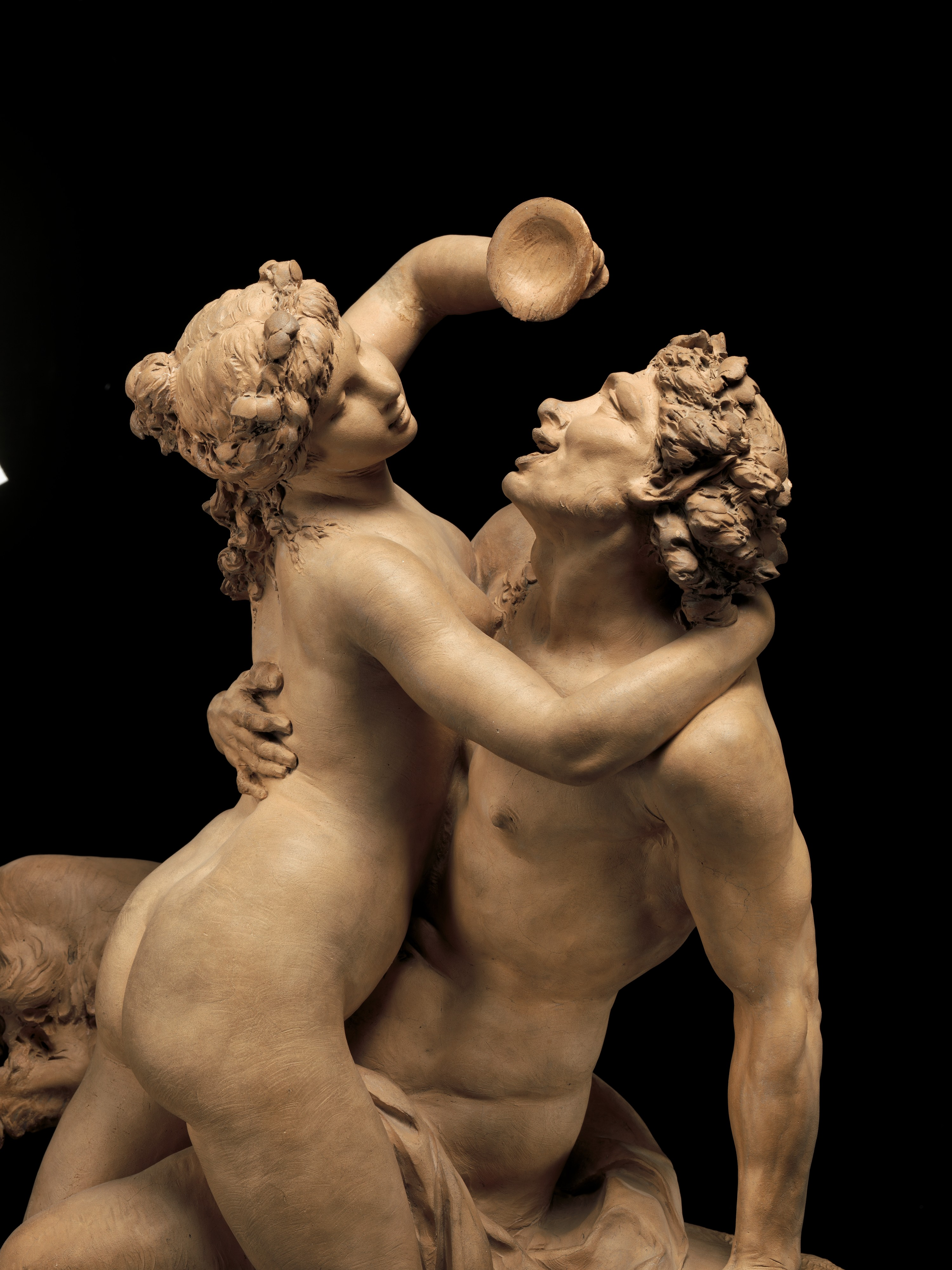
The intoxication of wine by Claude Michel (Clodion), terracotta, 1780s–1790s

Rococo sculpture was theatrical, sensual and dynamic, giving a sense of movement in every direction. It was most commonly found in the interiors of churches, usually closely integrated with painting and the architecture. Religious sculpture followed the Italian baroque style, as exemplified in the theatrical altarpiece of the Karlskirche in Vienna.

Early Rococo or Rocaille sculpture in France was lighter and offered more movement than the classical style of Louis XIV. It was encouraged in particular by Madame de Pompadour, mistress of Louis XV, who commissioned many works for her chateaux and gardens. The sculptor Edmé Bouchardon represented Cupid engaged in carving his darts of love from the club of Hercules. Rococo figures also crowded the later fountains at Versailles, such as the Fountain of Neptune by Lambert-Sigisbert Adam and Nicolas-Sebastien Adam (1740). Based on their success at Versailles, they were invited to Prussia by Frederick the Great to create fountain sculpture for Sanssouci Park, Prussia (1740s).

Étienne-Maurice Falconet (1716–1791) was another leading French sculptor during the period. Falconet was most famous for his Bronze Horseman statue of Peter the Great in St. Petersburg, but he also created a series of smaller works for wealthy collectors, which could be reproduced in a series in terracotta or cast in bronze. The French sculptors, Jean-Louis Lemoyne, Jean-Baptiste Lemoyne, Louis-Simon Boizot, Michel Clodion, Lambert-Sigisbert Adam and Jean-Baptiste Pigalle all produced sculpture in series for collectors.

In Italy, Antonio Corradini was among the leading sculptors of the Rococo style. A Venetian, he travelled around Europe, working for Peter the Great in St. Petersburg, for the courts in Austria and Naples. He preferred sentimental themes and made several skilled works of women with faces covered by veils, one of which is now in the Louvre.

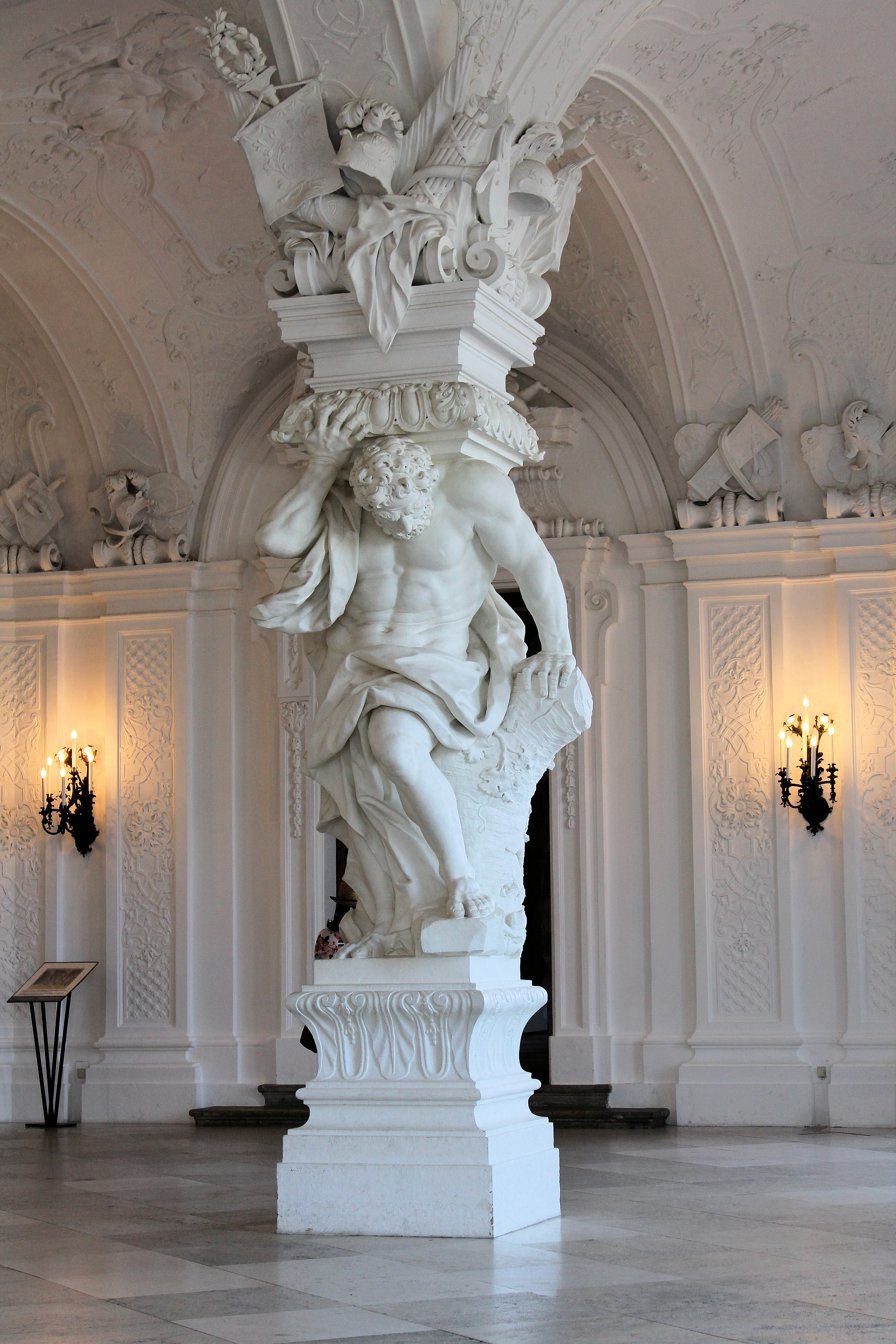
Atlantides in the upper Belvedere Palace, Vienna, by Johann Lukas von Hildebrandt (1721–1722)

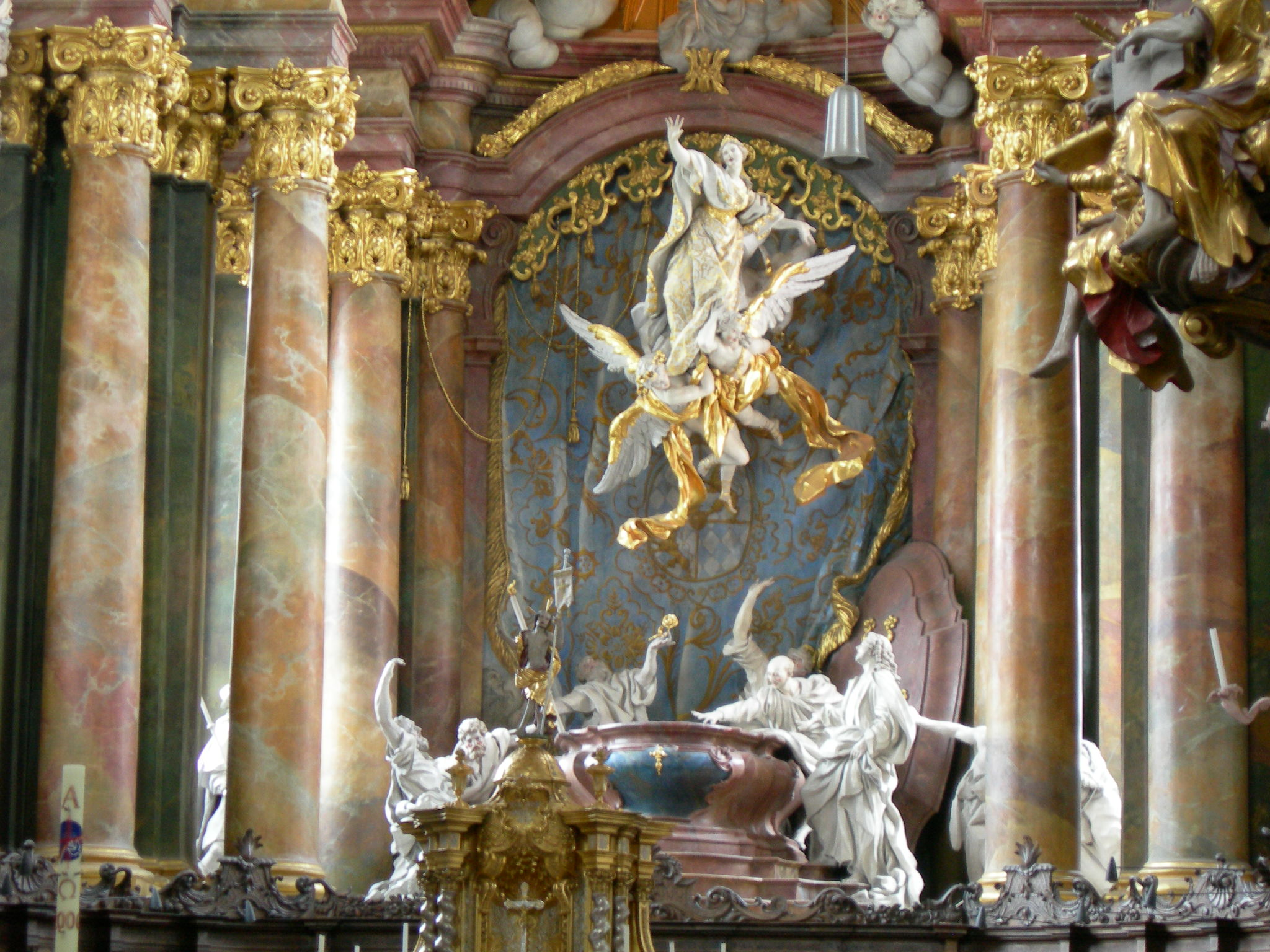
Assumption scene by Egid Quirin Asam (1722–1723) former monastery church, Rohr in Niederbayern

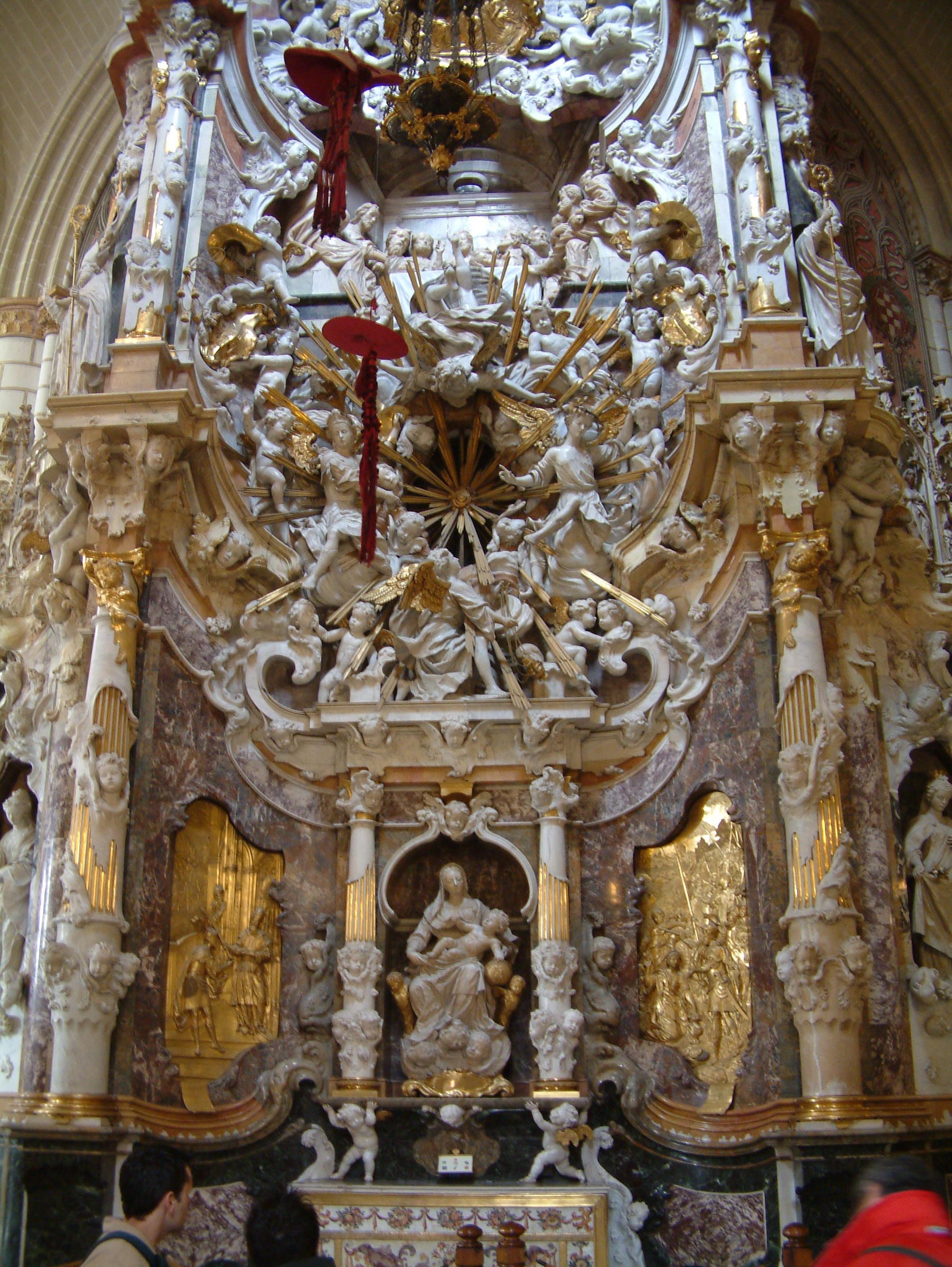
El Transparente altar in Toledo Cathedral by Narciso Tomé (1721–1732)

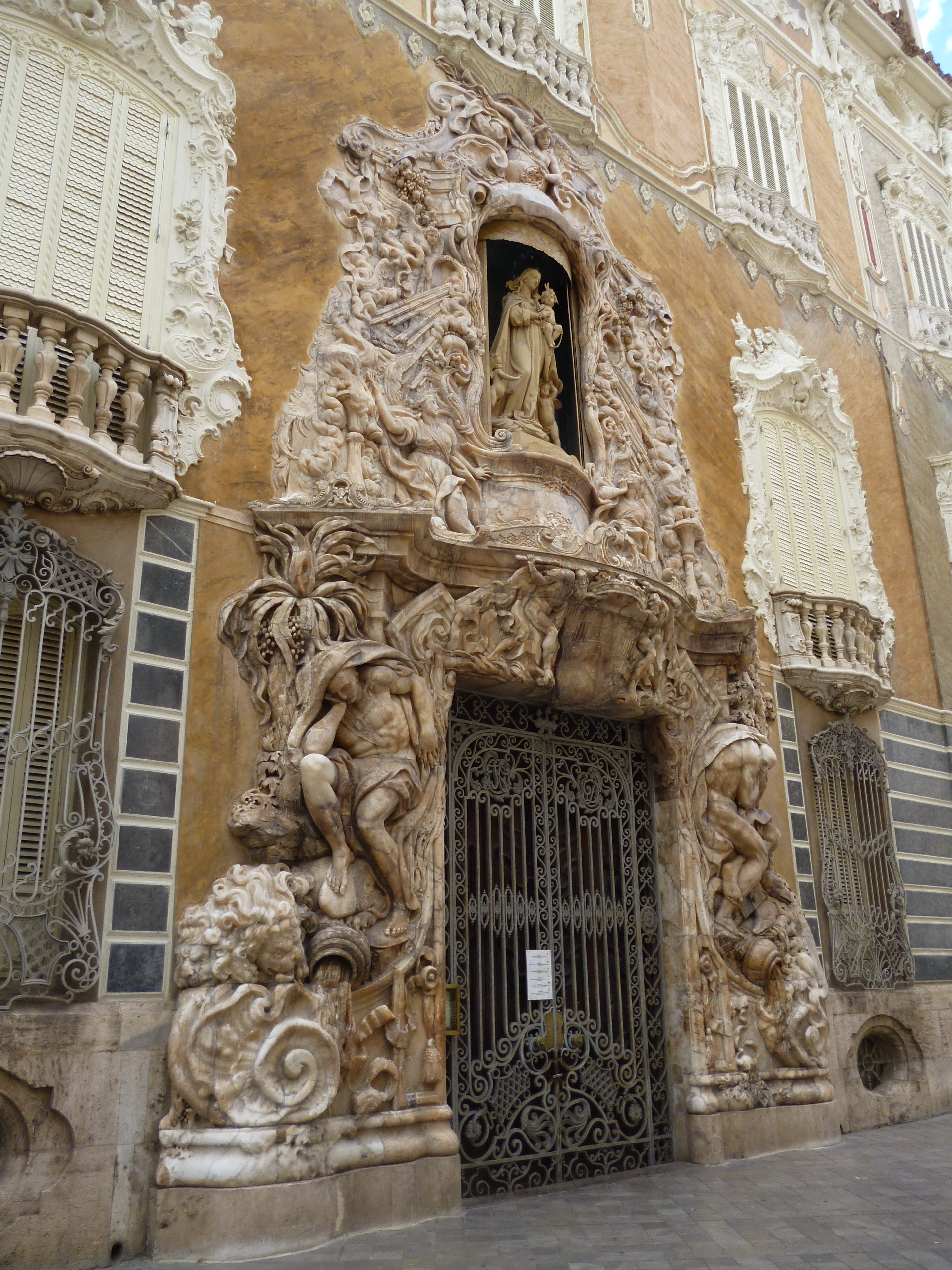
Portal of the Palace of the Marqués de Dos Aguas, Valencia, Spain (1740–1744)

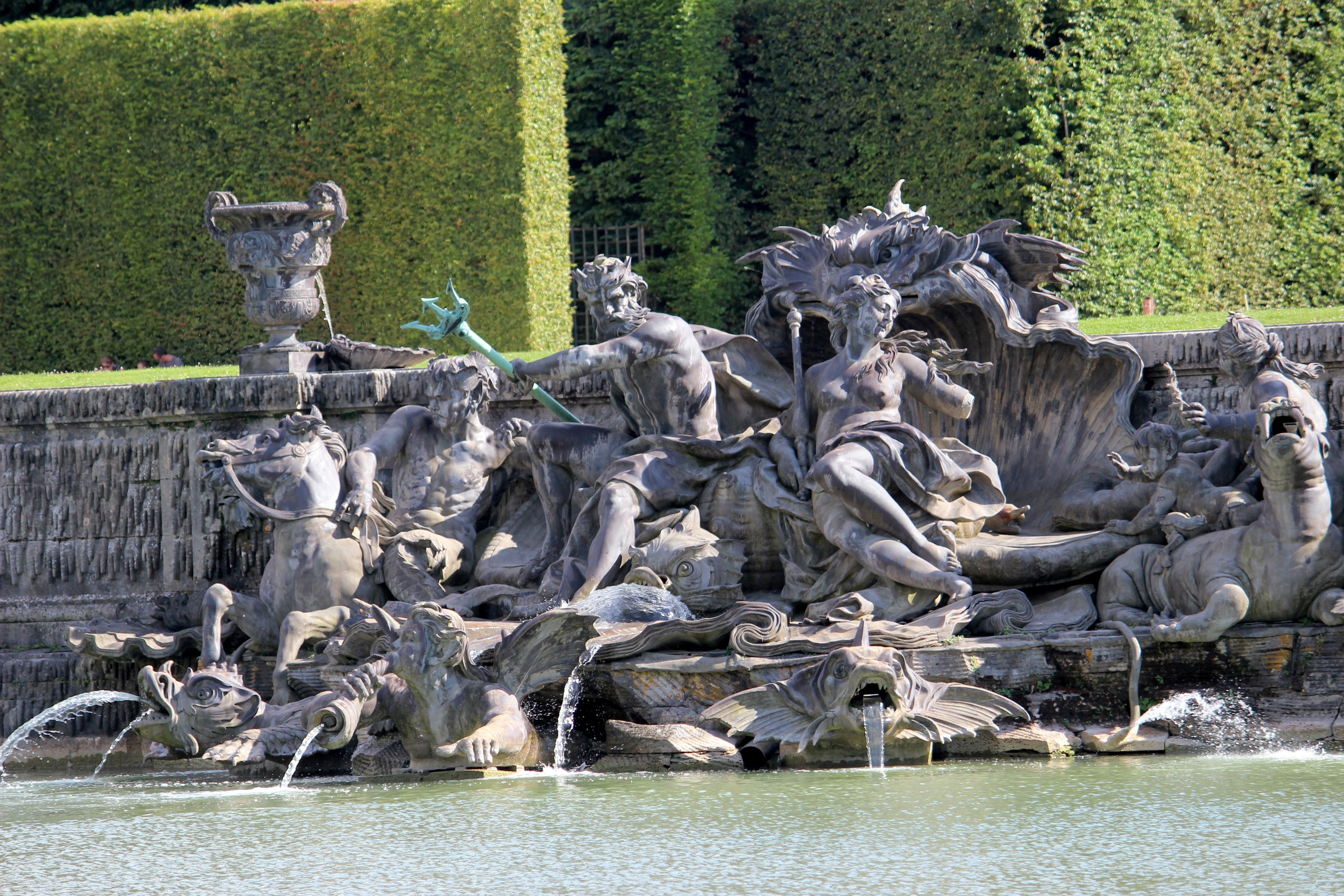
Fountain of Neptune and Amphitrite Palace of Versailles, by Lambert-Sigisbert Adam and Nicolas-Sebastien Adam (1740)

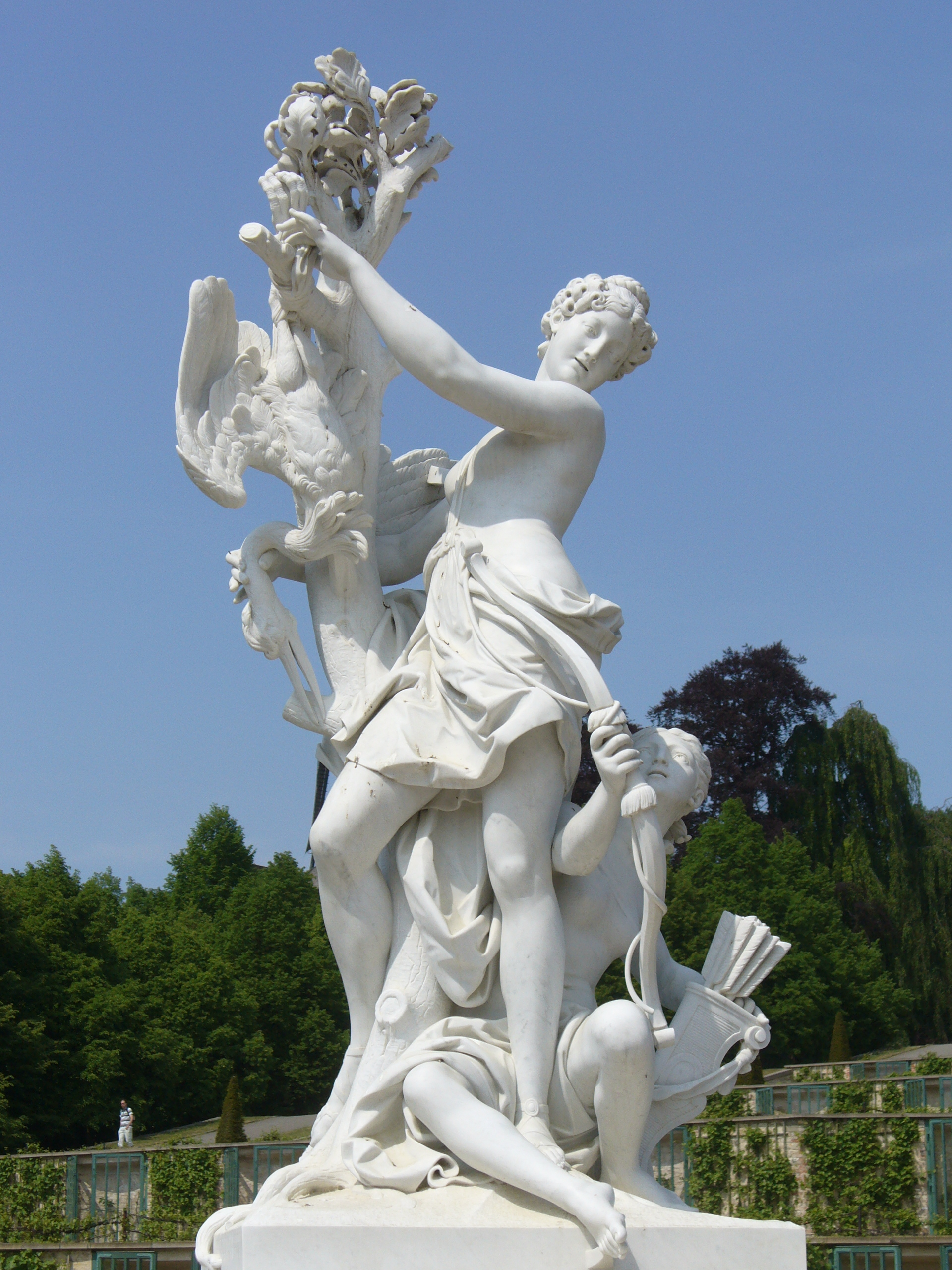
Fountain nymphs by Lambert-Sigisbert Adam at Sanssouci palace, Prussia (1740s)

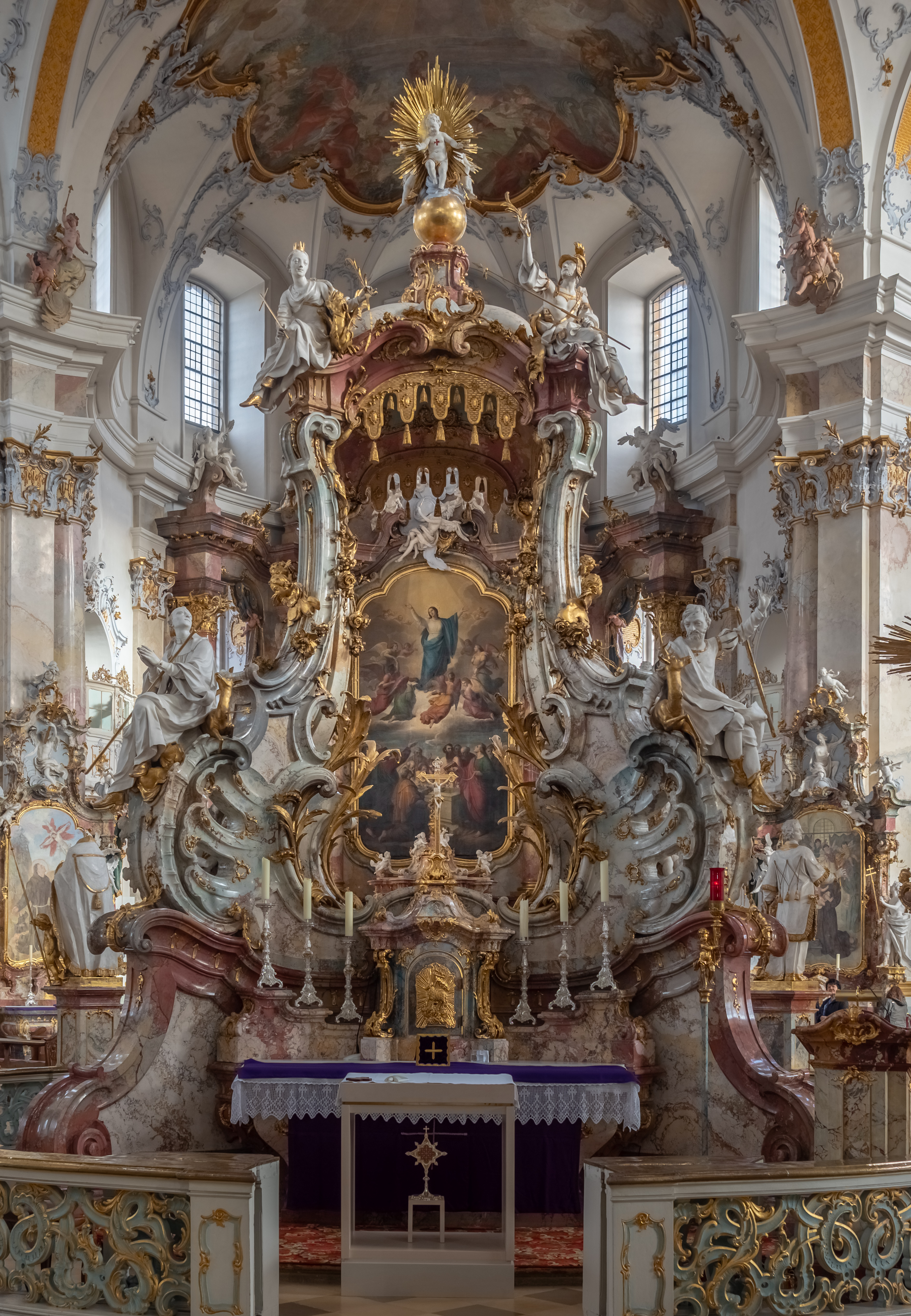
Mercy Altar depicting statues of the Fourteen Holy Helpers at Basilica of the Fourteen Holy Helpers

The most elaborate examples of rococo sculpture were found in Spain, Austria and southern Germany, in the decoration of palaces and churches. The sculpture was closely integrated with the architecture; it was impossible to know where one stopped and the other began. In the Belvedere Palace in Vienna, (1721–1722), the vaulted ceiling of the Hall of the Atlantes is held up on the shoulders of muscular figures designed by Johann Lukas von Hildebrandt. The portal of the Palace of the Marqués de Dos Aguas in Valencia (1715–1776) was completely drenched in sculpture carved in marble, from designs by Hipolito Rovira Brocandel.

The El Transparente altar, in the major chapel of Toledo Cathedral is a towering sculpture of polychrome marble and gilded stucco, combined with paintings, statues and symbols. It was made by Narciso Tomé (1721–1732), Its design allows light to pass through, and in changing light it seems to move.

== Porcelain ==
A new form of small-scale sculpture appeared, the porcelain figure, or small group of figures, initially replacing sugar sculptures on grand dining room tables, but soon popular for placing on mantelpieces and furniture. The number of European factories grew steadily through the century, and some made porcelain that the expanding middle classes could afford. The amount of colourful overglaze decoration used on them also increased. They were usually modelled by artists who had trained in sculpture. Common subjects included figures from the commedia dell'arte, city street vendors, lovers and figures in fashionable clothes, and pairs of birds.

Johann Joachim Kändler was the most important modeller of Meissen porcelain, the earliest European factory, which remained the most important until about 1760. The Swiss-born German sculptor Franz Anton Bustelli produced a wide variety of colourful figures for the Nymphenburg Porcelain Manufactory in Bavaria, which were sold throughout Europe. The French sculptor Étienne-Maurice Falconet (1716 – 1791) followed this example. While also making large-scale works, he became director of the Sevres Porcelain manufactory and produced small-scale works, usually about love and gaiety, for production in series.

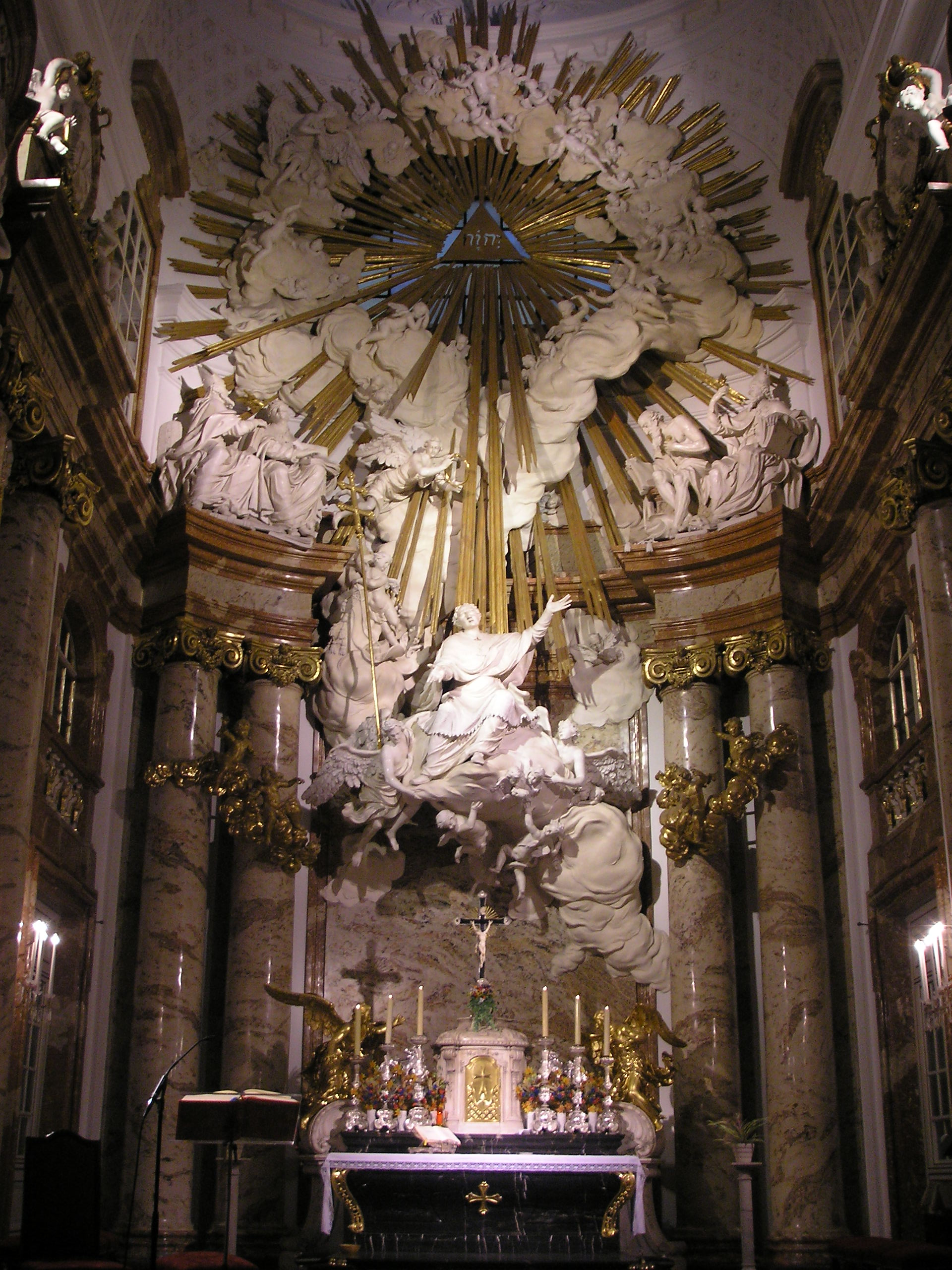
High altar of the Karlskirche in Vienna (1737)

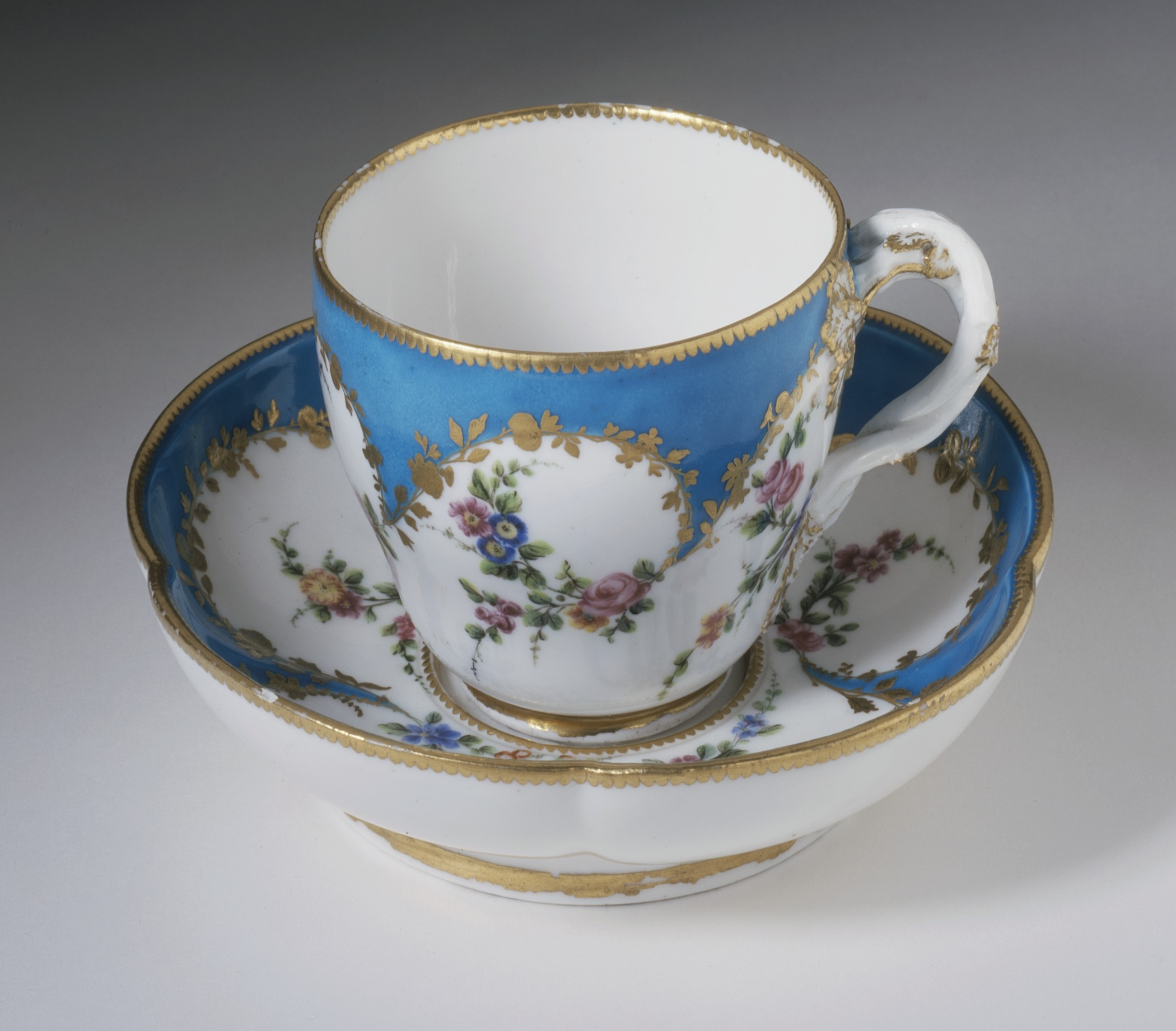
Cup with saucer; c. 1753; soft-paste porcelain with glaze and enamel; Los Angeles County Museum of Art

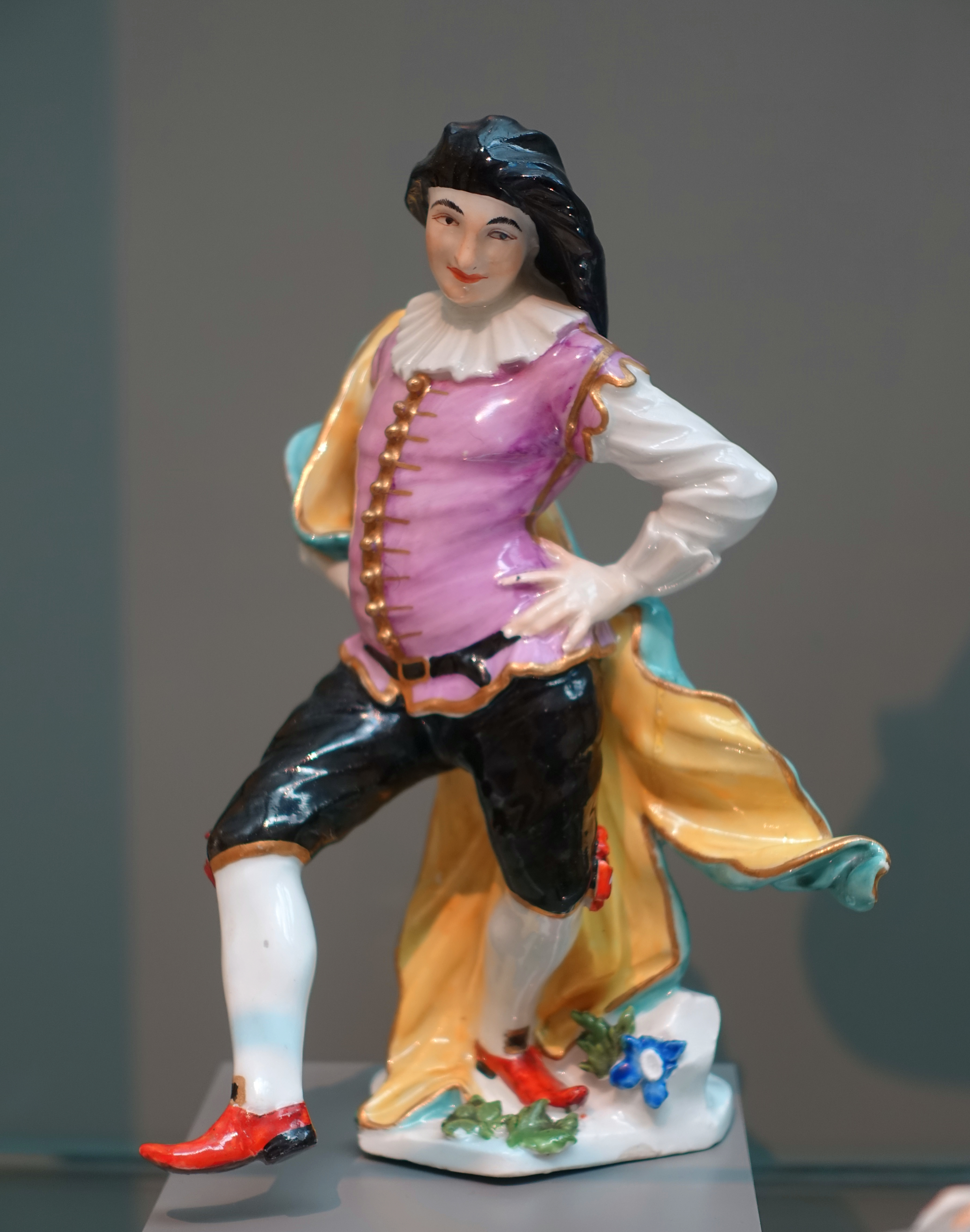
Mezzetin, by Johann Joachim Kaendler, Meissen, c. 1739

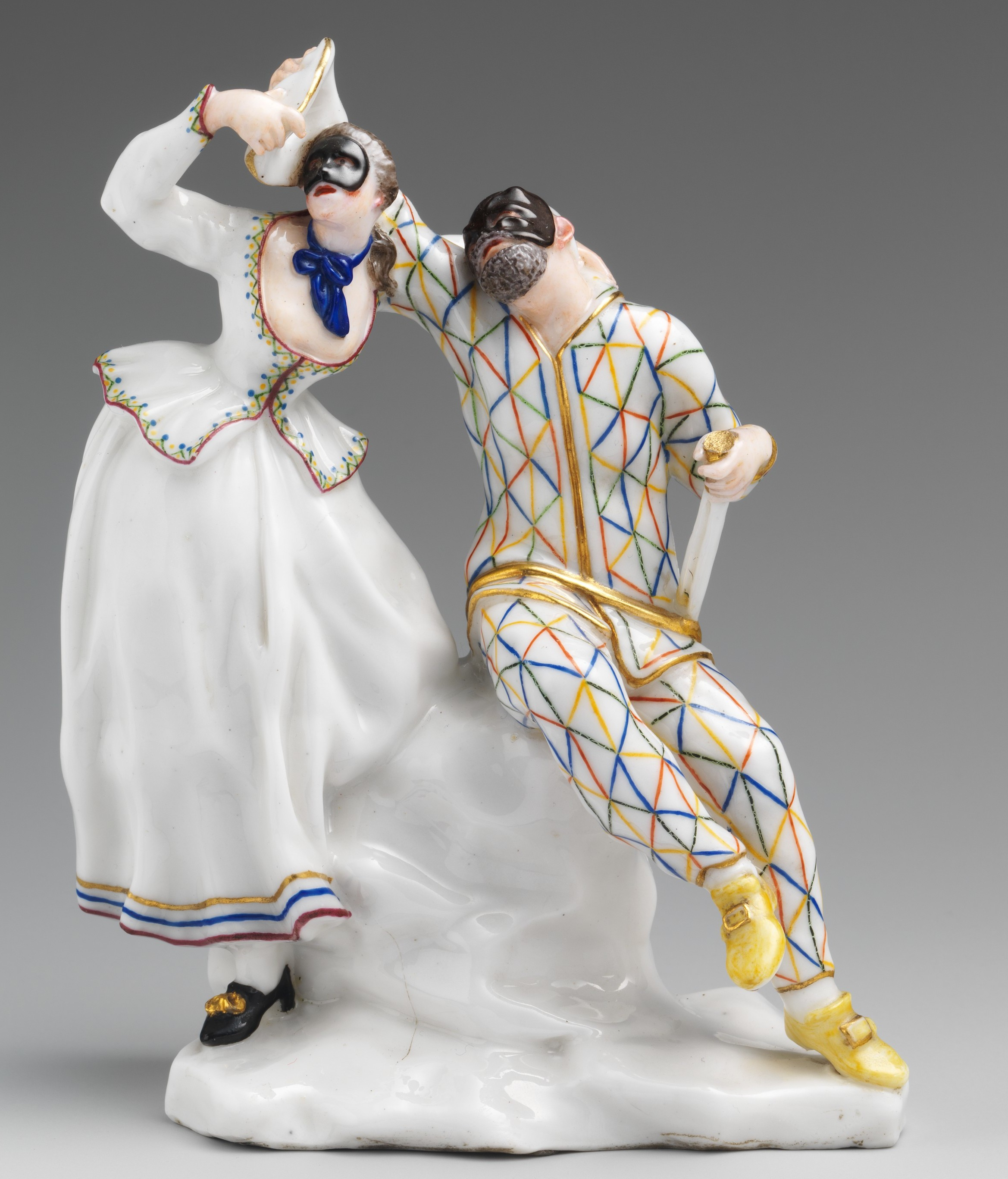
Harlequin and Columbine, Capodimonte porcelain, c. 1745

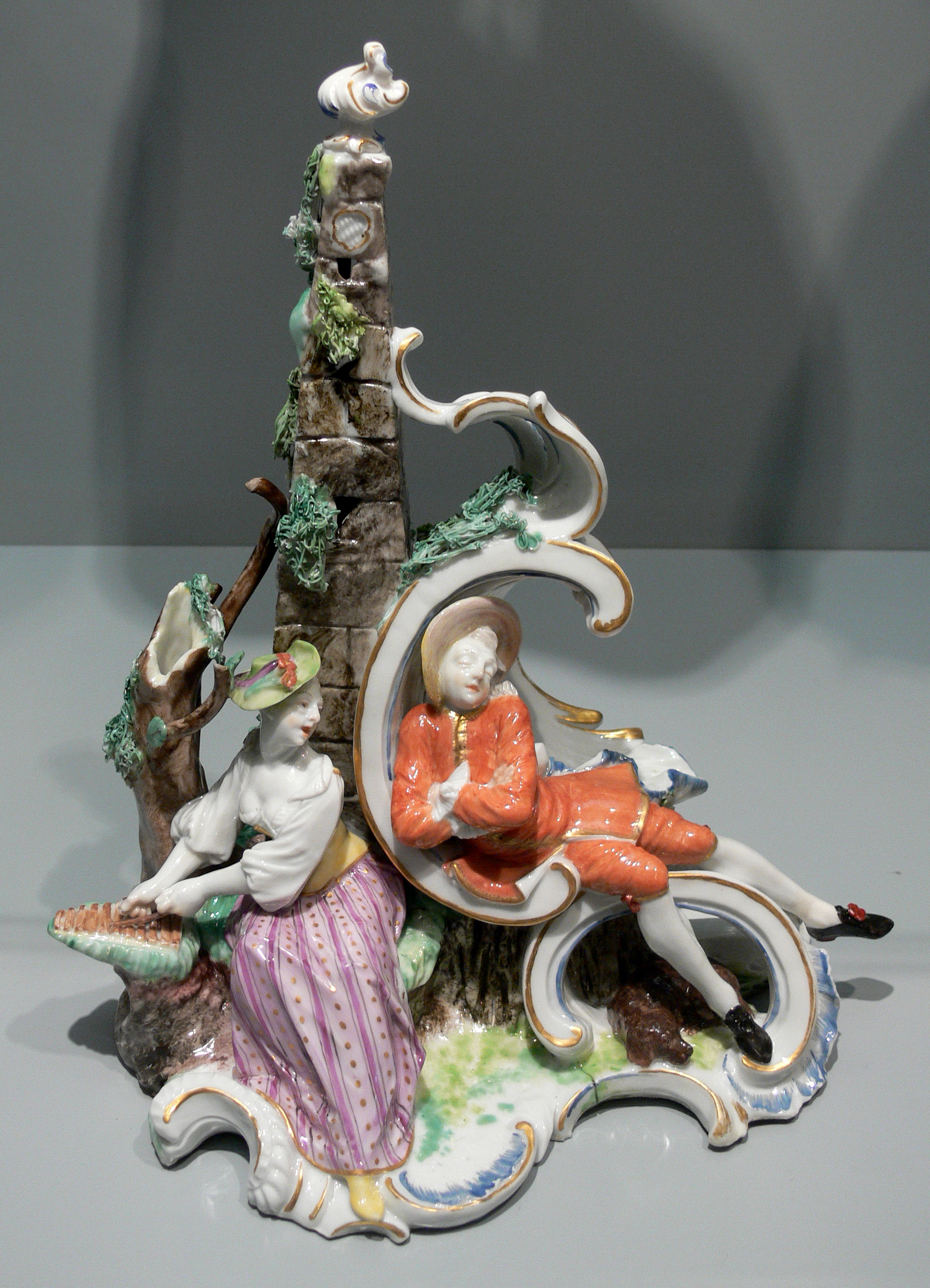
Pair of lovers group of Nymphenburg porcelain, c. 1760, modelled by Franz Anton Bustelli

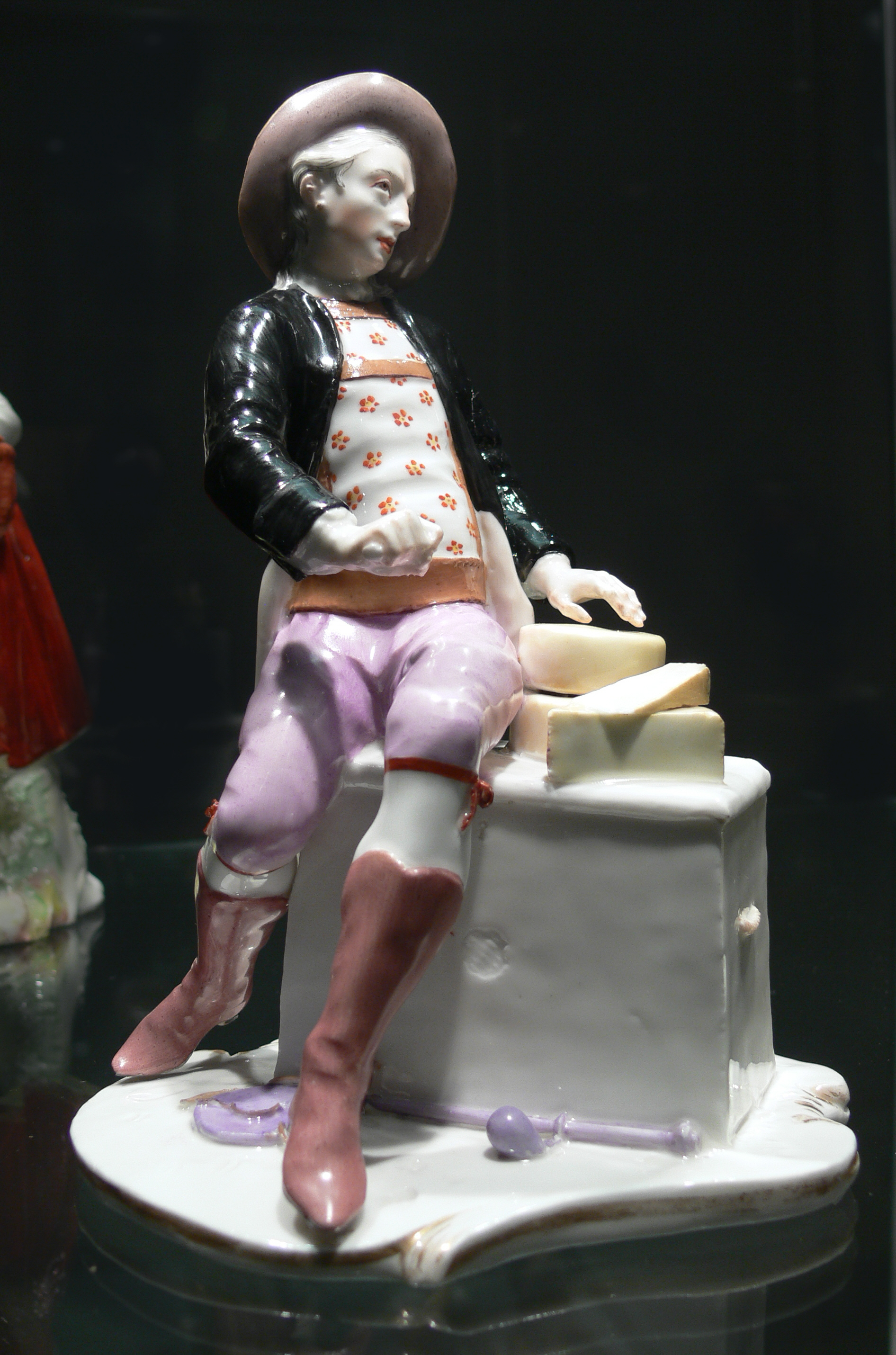
Figure of a cheese seller by Franz Anton Bustelli, Nymphenburg porcelain (1755)

== Music ==
A Rococo period existed in music history, although it is not as well known as the earlier Baroque and later Classical forms. The Rococo music style itself developed out of baroque music both in France, where the new style was referred to as style galant ("gallant" or "elegant" style), and in Germany, where it was referred to as empfindsamer Stil ("sensitive style"). It can be characterized as light, intimate music with extremely elaborate and refined forms of ornamentation.

In the second half of the 18th century, a reaction against the Rococo style occurred, primarily against its perceived overuse of ornamentation and decoration. Led by Christoph Willibald Gluck, this reaction ushered in the Classical era. By the early 19th century, Catholic opinion had turned against the suitability of the style for ecclesiastical contexts because it was "in no way conducive to sentiments of devotion".

Russian composer of the Romantic era Pyotr Ilyich Tchaikovsky wrote The Variations on a Rococo Theme, Op. 33, for cello and orchestra in 1877. Although the theme is not Rococo in origin, it is written in Rococo style.

== Fashion ==
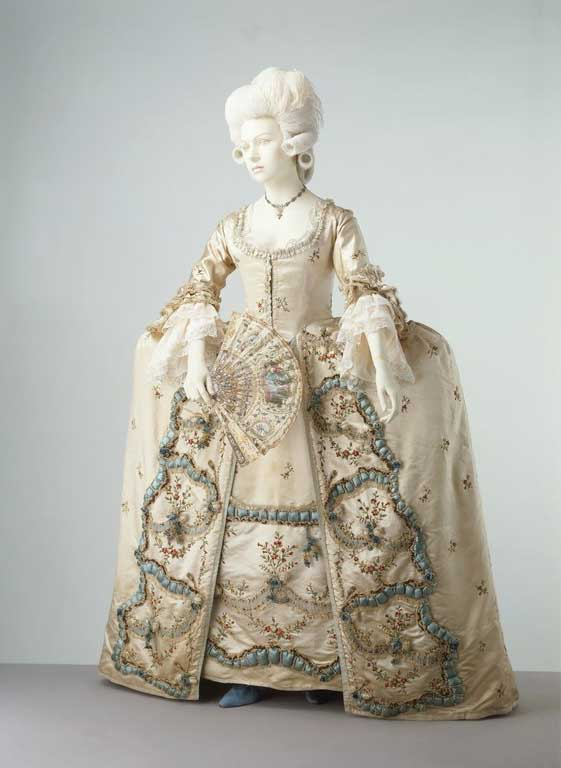
Sack-back gown and petticoat, 1775–1780 V&A Museum no. T.180&A-1965

Rococo fashion was intended to have a extravagant, elegant, refined and decorated appeal to it. Women's fashion of the seventeenth-century was contrasted by the fashion of the eighteenth-century, which was ornate and sophisticated. These fashions spread beyond the royal court into the salons and cafés of the ascendant bourgeoisie. The practice in dressing in a exuberant, playful, elegant style of decoration and design is now called 'Rococo' was then known as le style rocaille, le style moderne, le gout.

A style that appeared in the early eighteenth-century was the robe volante, a flowing gown, that became popular towards the end of King Louis XIV's reign. This gown had the features of a bodice with large pleats flowing down the back to the ground over a rounded petticoat. The colour palette was rich, dark fabrics accompanied by elaborate, heavy design features. After the death of Louis XIV the clothing styles began to change. The fashion took a turn to a lighter, more frivolous style, transitioning from the baroque period to the well-known style of Rococo. The later period was known for their pastel colours, more revealing frocks, and the plethora of frills, ruffles, bows, and lace as trims. Shortly after the typical women's Rococo gown was introduced, robe à la Française, a gown with a tight bodice that had a low cut neckline, usually with a large ribbon bows down the centre front, wide panniers, and was lavishly trimmed in large amounts of lace, ribbon, and flowers.

The Watteau pleats also became more popular, named after the painter Jean-Antoine Watteau, who painted the details of the gowns down to the stitches of lace and other trimmings with immense accuracy. Later, the 'pannier' and 'mantua' became fashionable around 1718. They were wide hoops under the dress to extend the hips out sideways and they soon became a staple in formal wear. This gave the Rococo period the iconic dress of wide hips combined with the large amount of decoration on the garments. Wide panniers were worn for special occasions, and could reach up to 16 feet (4.9 metres) in diameter, and smaller hoops were worn for the everyday settings. These features originally came from seventeenth-century Spanish fashion, known as guardainfante, initially designed to hide the pregnant stomach, then reimagined later as the pannier. 1745 became the Golden Age of the Rococo with the introduction of a more exotic, oriental culture in France called a la turque. This was made popular by Louis XV's mistress, Madame de Pompadour, who commissioned the artist, Charles-André van Loo, to paint her as a Turkish sultana.

In the 1760s, a style of less formal dresses emerged and one of these was the polonaise, with inspiration taken from Poland. It was shorter than the French dress, allowing the underskirt and ankles to be seen, which made it easier to move around in. Another dress that came into fashion was the robe a l'anglais, which included elements inspired by the males' fashion; a short jacket, broad lapels and long sleeves. It also had a snug bodice, a full skirt without panniers but still a little long in the back to form a small train, and often some type of lace kerchief worn around the neck. Another piece was the 'redingote', halfway between a cape and an overcoat.

Accessories were also important to all women during this time, as they added to the opulence and the decor of the body to match their gowns. At any official ceremony ladies were required to cover their hands and arms with gloves if their clothes were sleeveless.

== Literature ==
In literature the term is "unhelpfully vague, but usually suggests a cheerful lightness and intimacy of tone, and an elegant playfulness." Principal Rococo literary genres were small forms, such as erotic light poetry (French: poésie légère or poésie fugitive), sonnet, madrigal and other songs, pastoral, fairy tail, novella, but there were also long narrative poems, for example, Christoph Martin Wieland's German-language masterpiece Oberon.

Predominantly an 18th-century French literature style, influenced by the 17th-century Précieuses school, is represented by Anne Claude de Caylus, the author of the Art of Love P. J. Bernard, Alexandre Masson de Pezay (the narrative poem Zélis' Bathing), Abbé de Favre (the poem Les quatre heures de la toilette des dames), Évariste de Parny, Jean-Baptiste Louvet de Couvray, and other writers. The Rococo had also followers in Italy (Paolo Rolli, Pietro Metastasio) and Germany (Friedrich von Hagedorn, Johann Wilhelm Ludwig Gleim, Johann Uz, Johann Nikolaus Götz), and to a lesser extent, within English and Russian (Ippolit Bogdanovich) writings.

== Gallery ==
=== Architecture ===
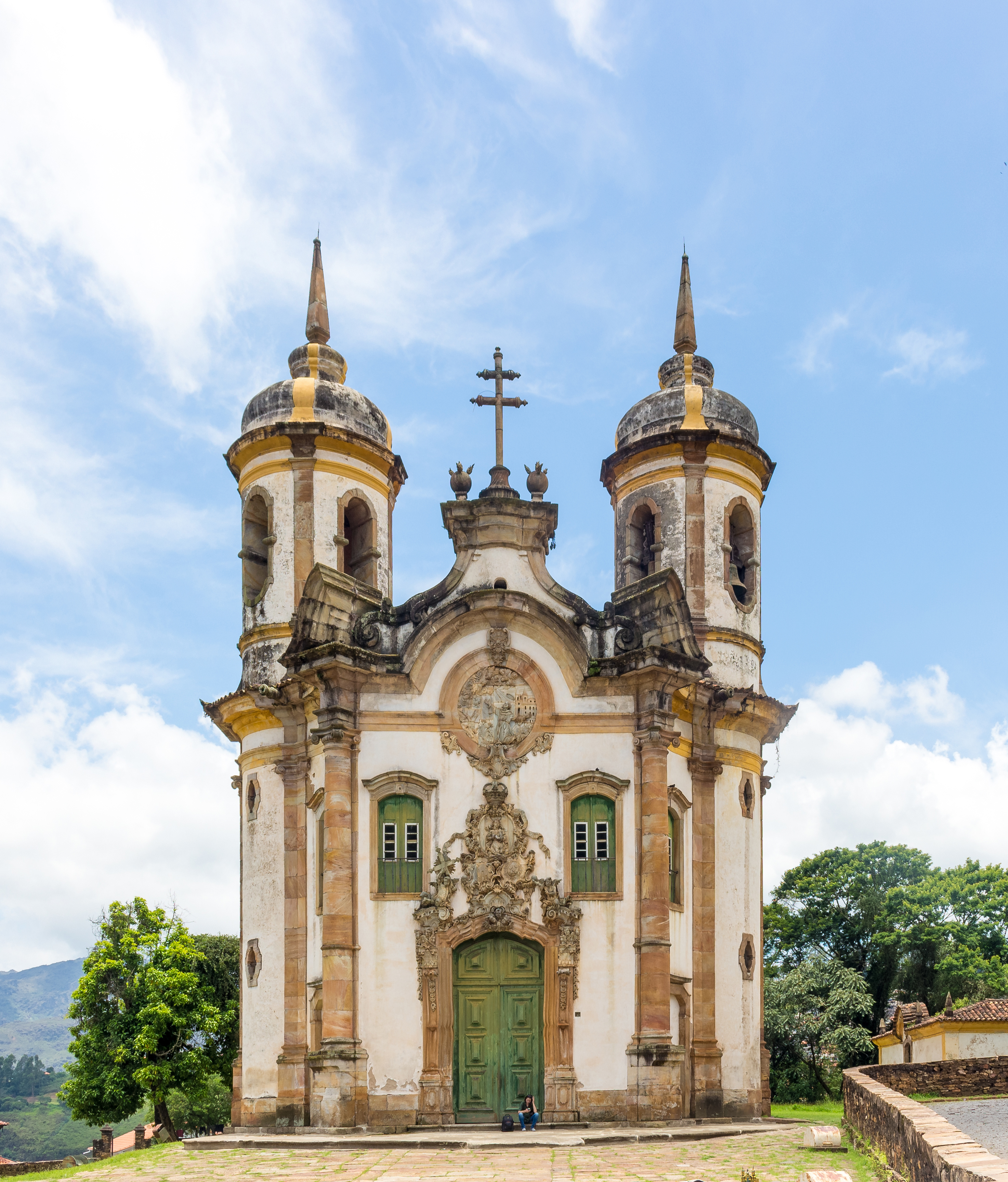
Church of São Francisco de Assis, Ouro Preto, Brazil, 1749–1774, by Aleijadinho

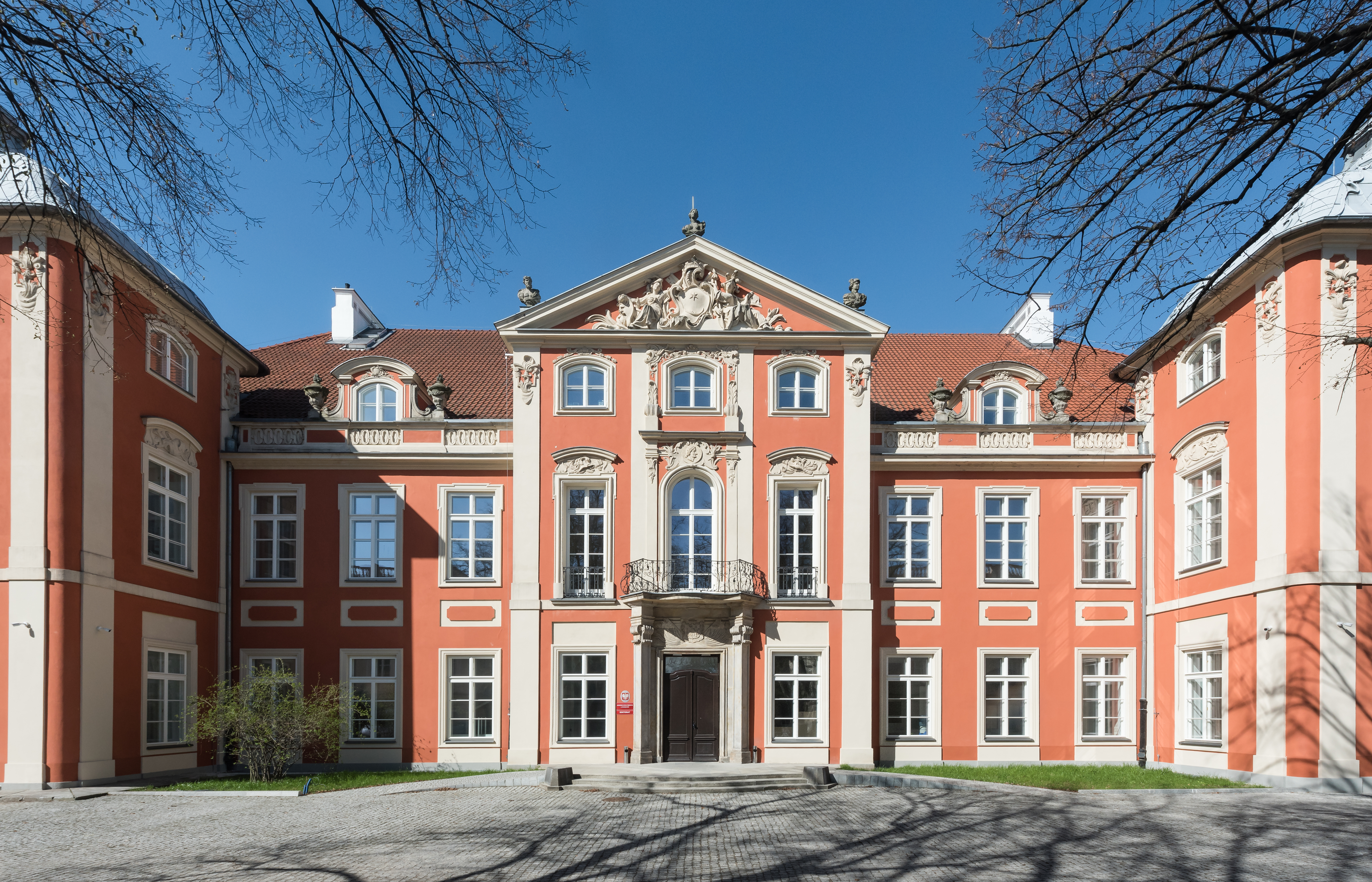
Czapski Palace in Warsaw, Poland, 1712–1721, reflects the rococo fascination with oriental architecture

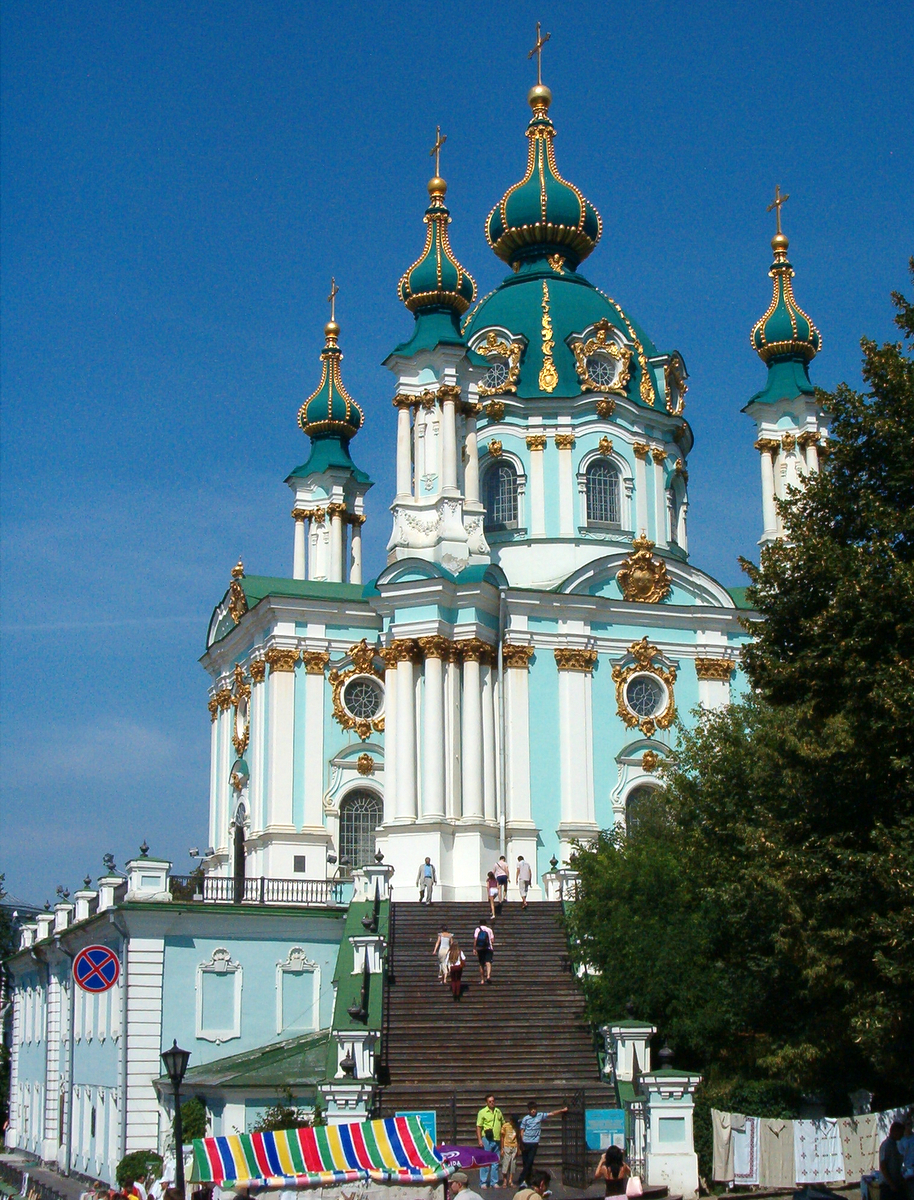
St Andrew's Church, Kyiv, 1744–1767, designed by Francesco Bartolomeo Rastrelli

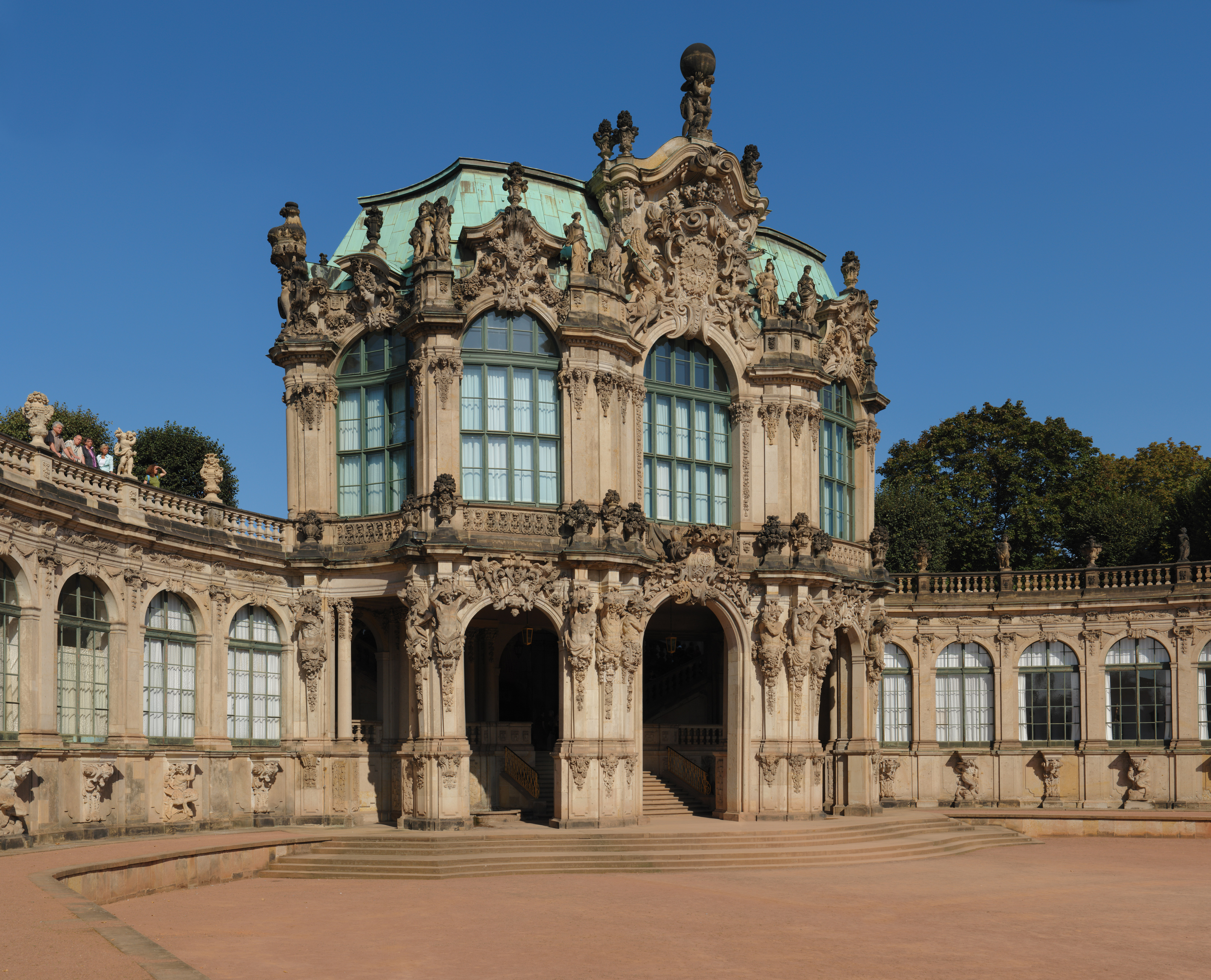
Zwinger (Dresden)

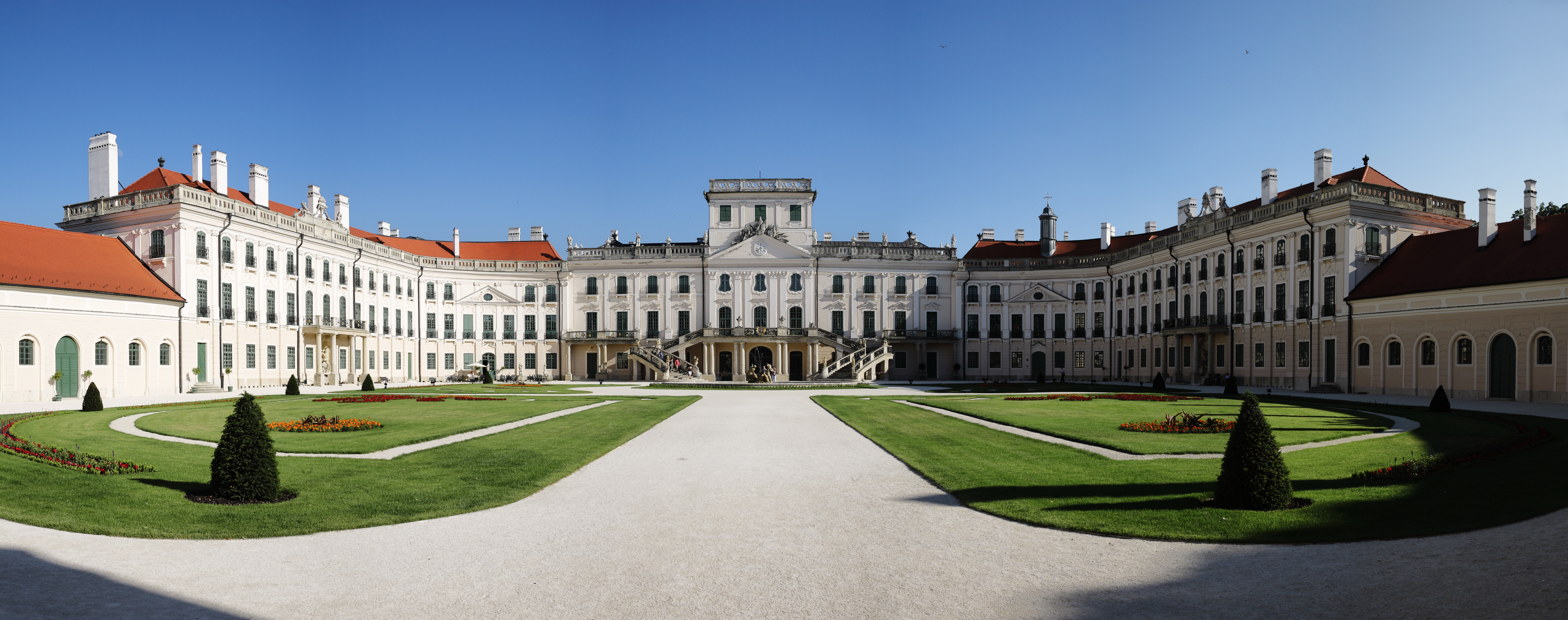
Eszterháza in Fertőd, Hungary, 1720–1766, sometimes called the "Hungarian Versailles"

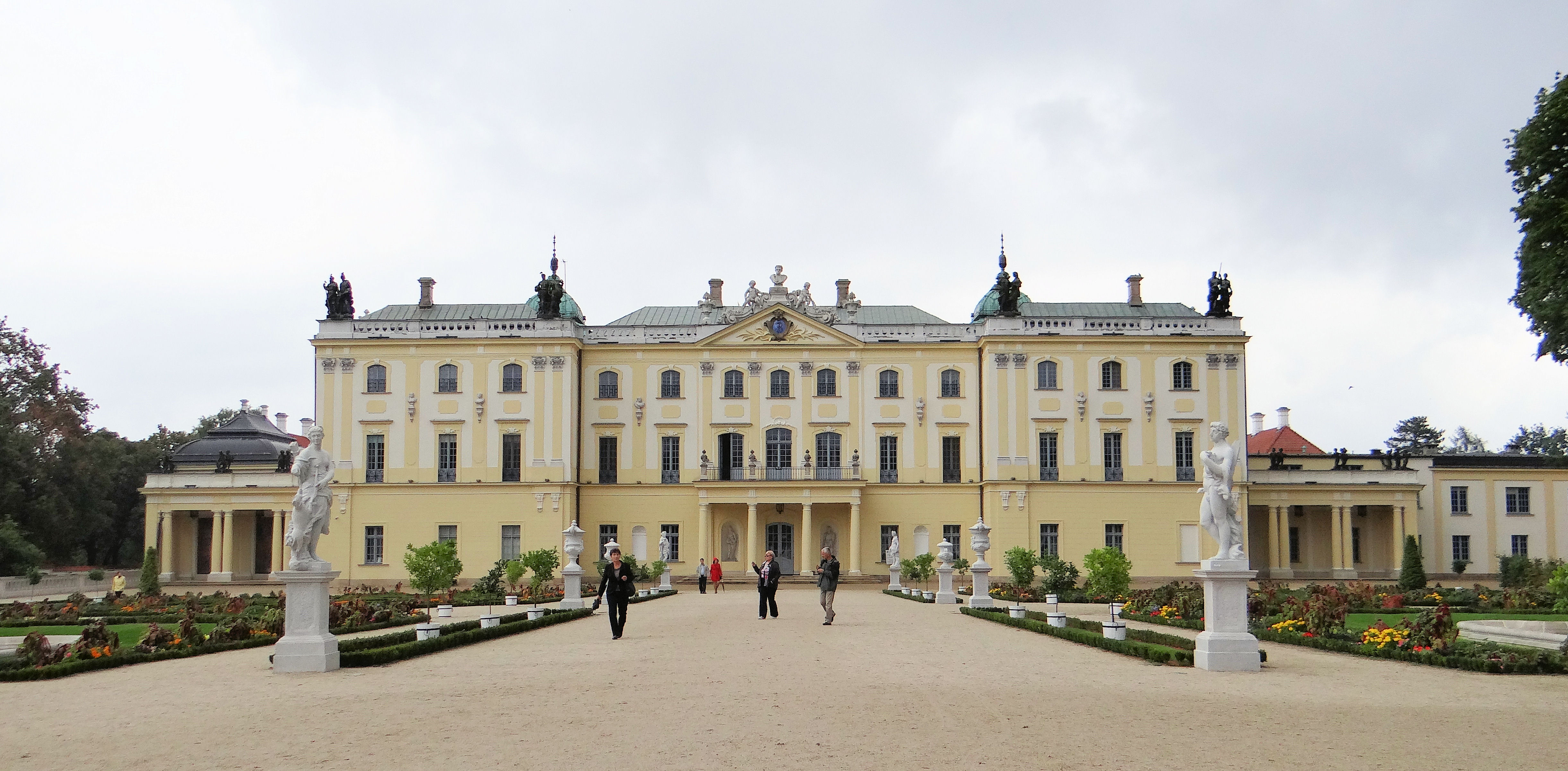
The Rococo Branicki Palace, Białystok, sometimes referred to as the "Polish Versailles"

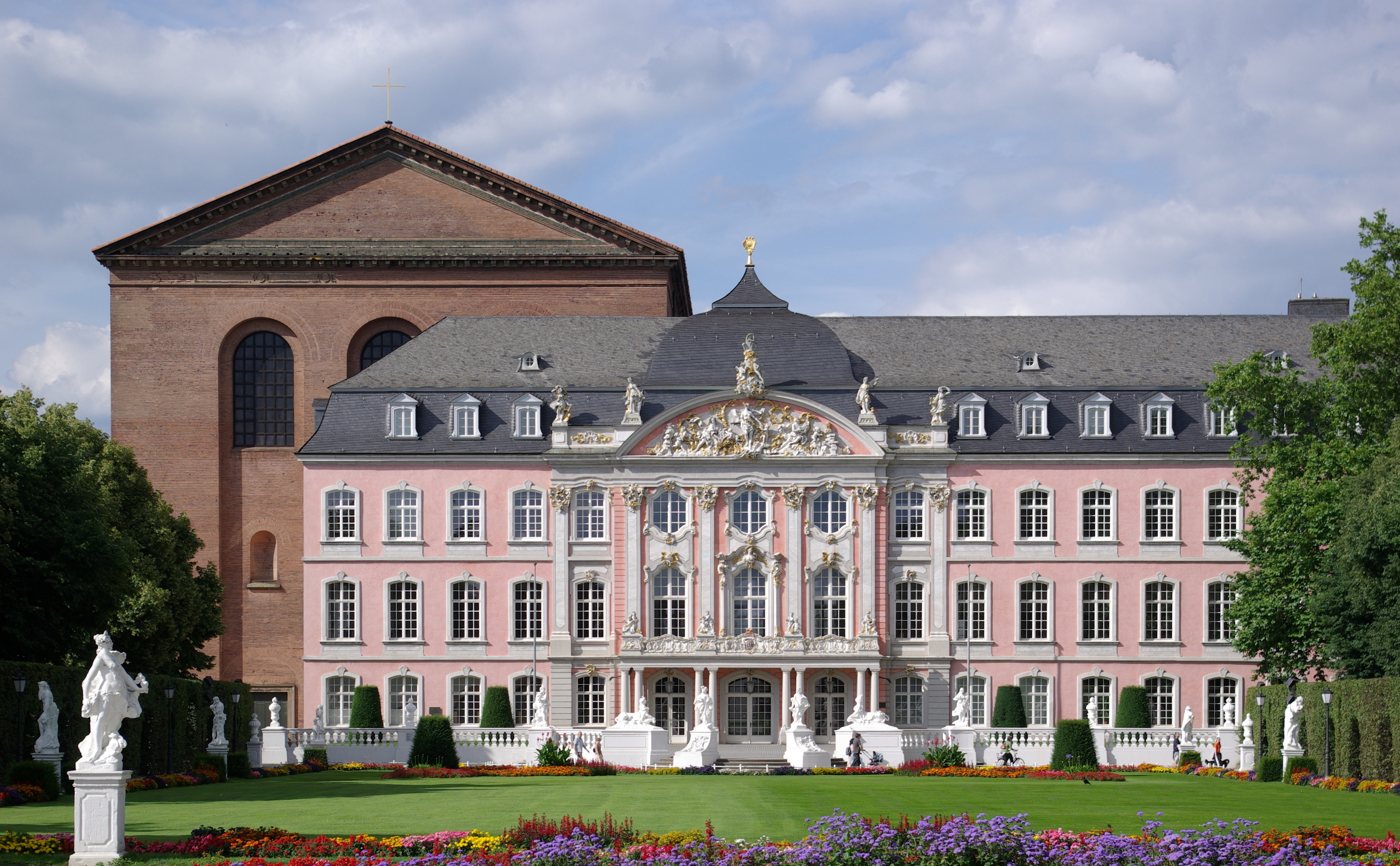
Electoral Palace, Trier

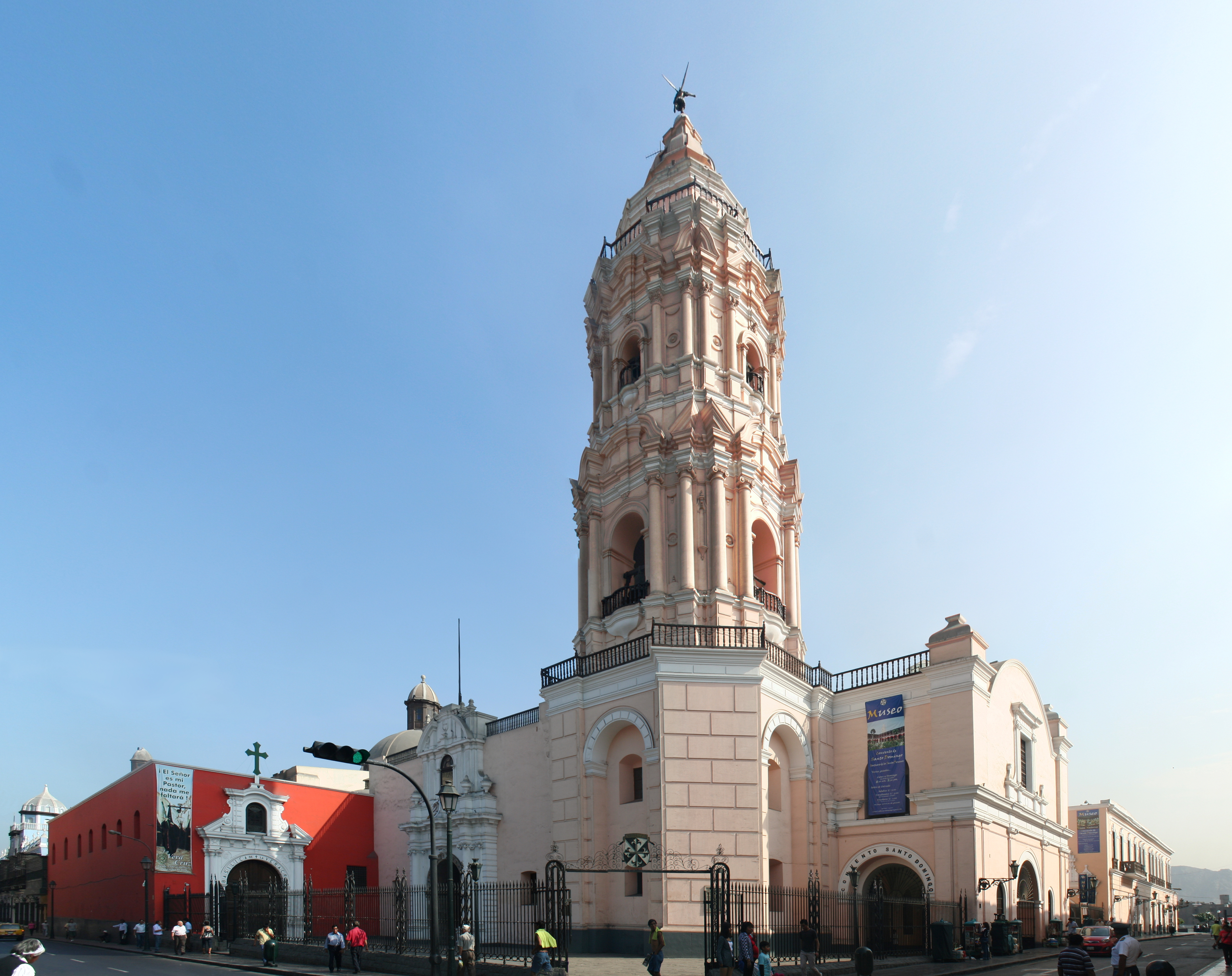
Basilica of Santo Domingo, Lima, Peru, completed in 1766, by Manuel de Amat y Junyent

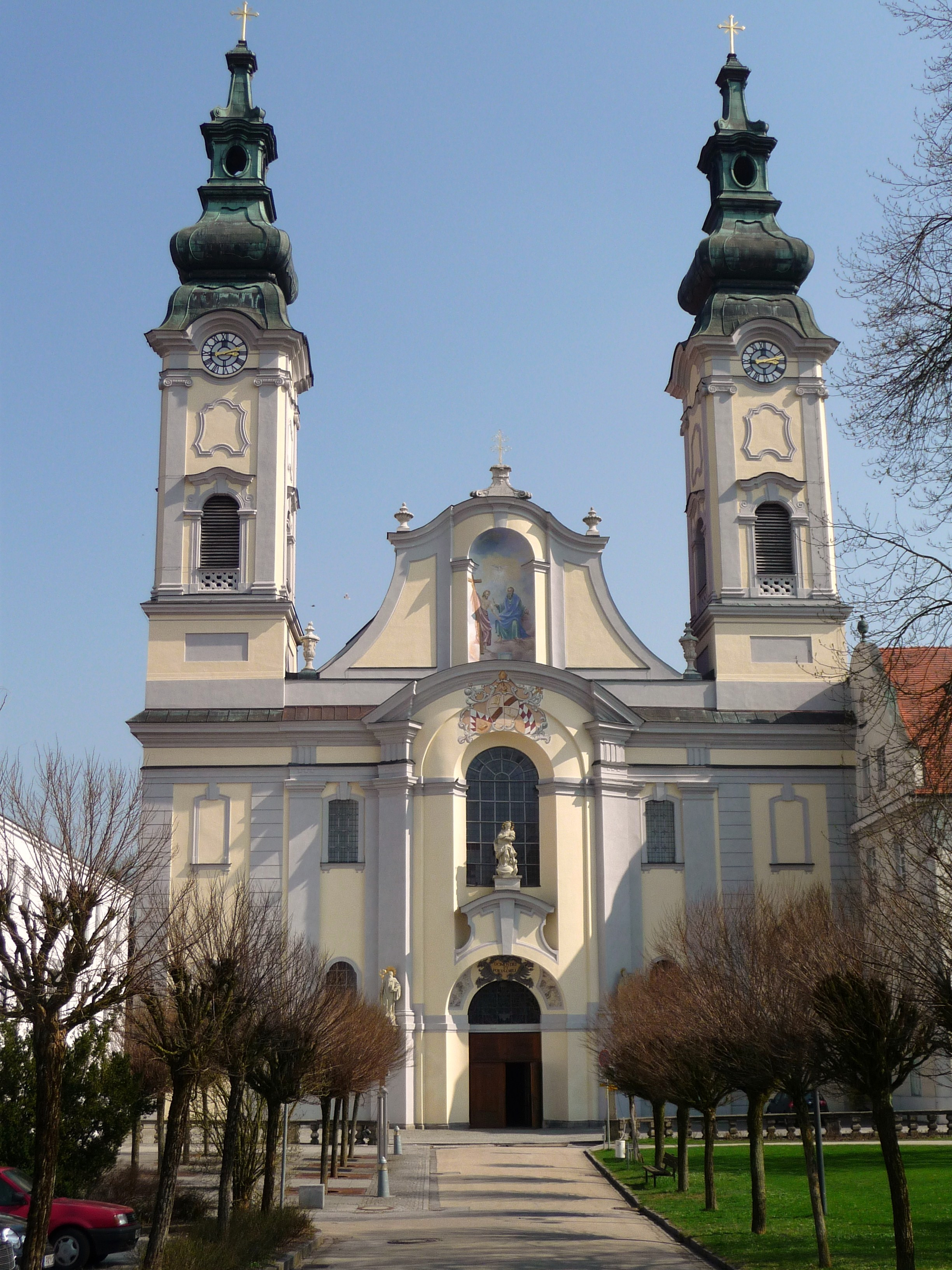
Fürstenzell Abbey church, 1739–1744

=== Engravings ===
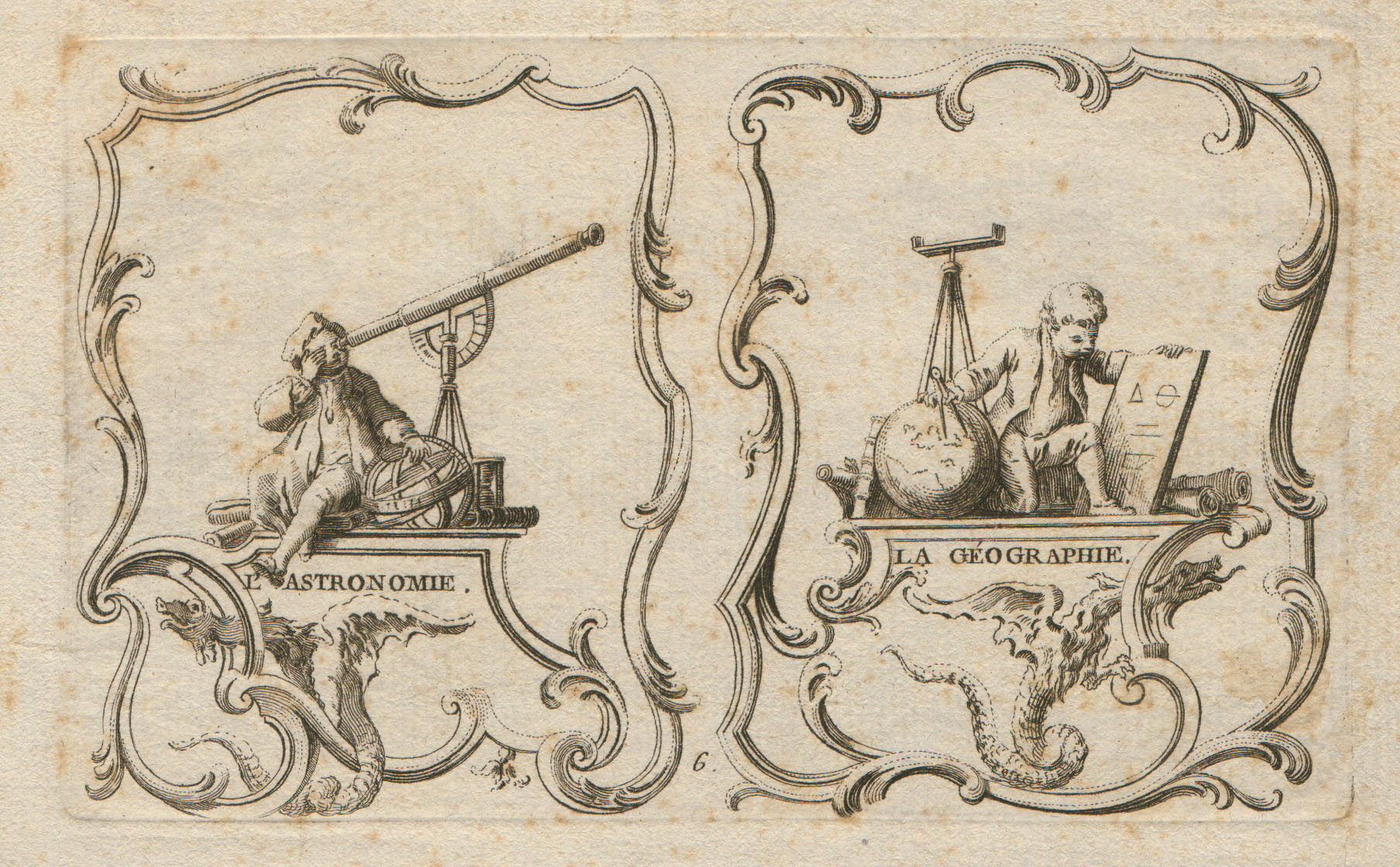
Unknown artist. Allegories of astronomy and geography. France (?), c. 1750s

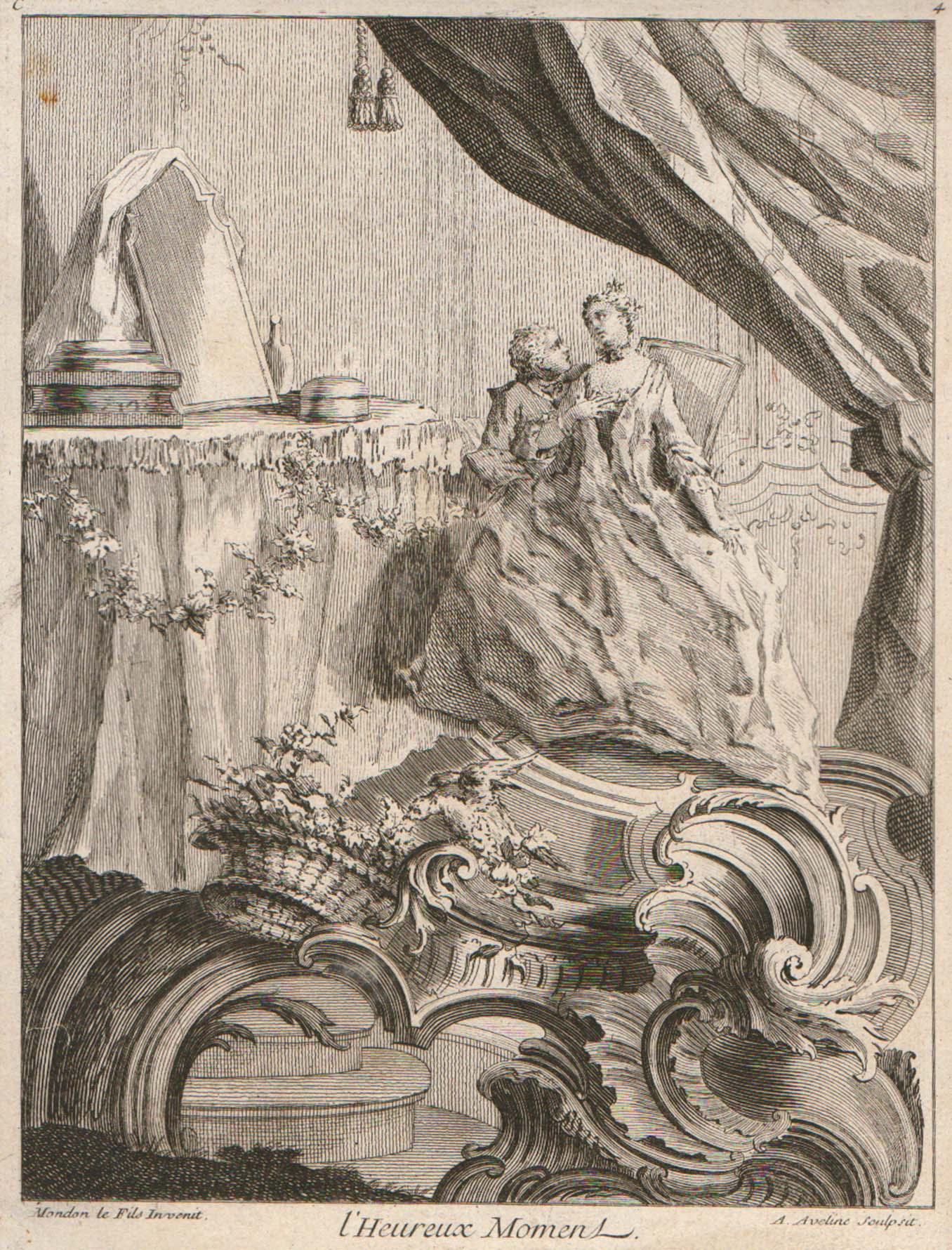
A. Avelin after Mondon le Fils. L′Heureux moment. 1736

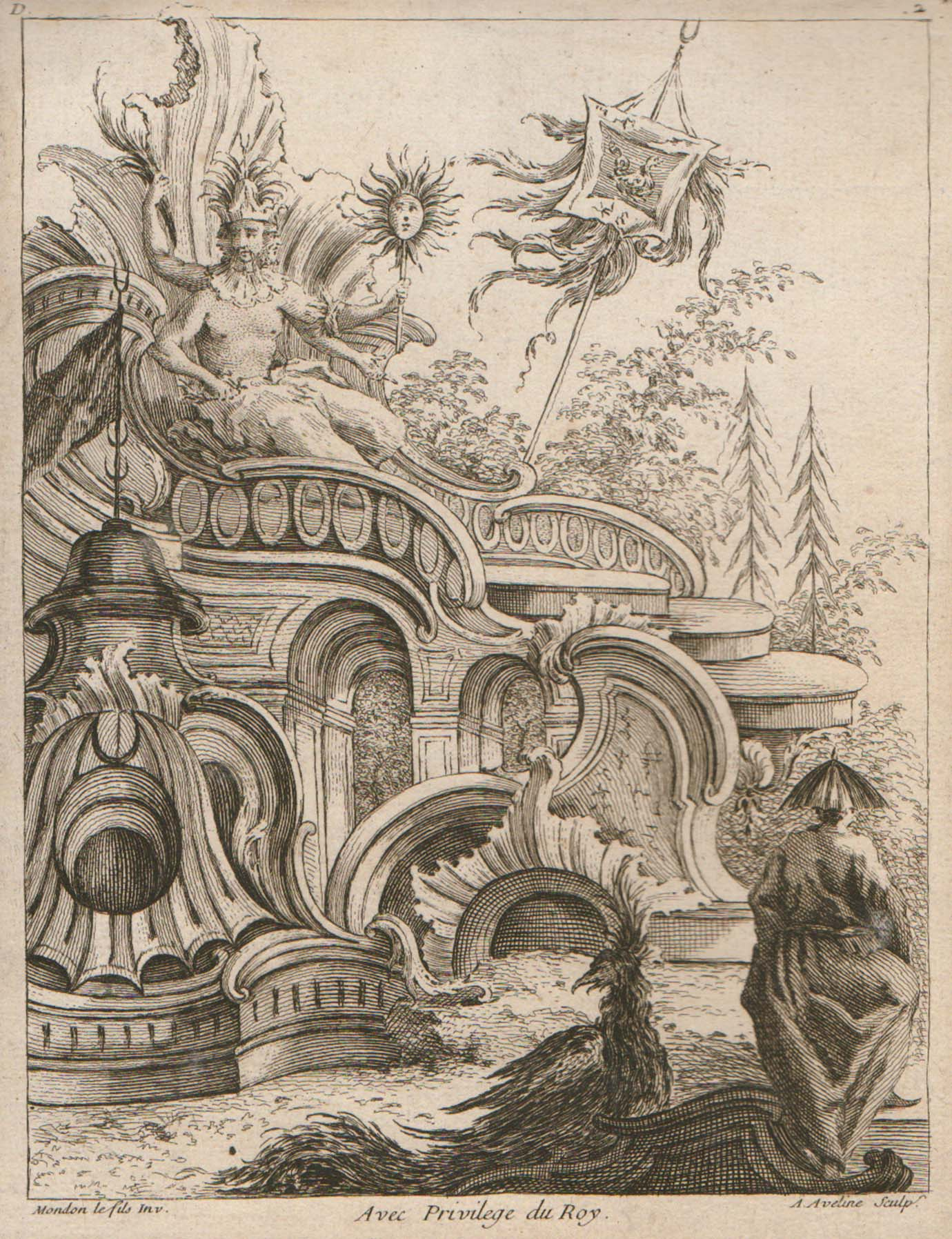
A. Avelin after Mondon le Fils. Chinese God. An engraving from the ouvrage «Quatrieme livre des formes, orneė des rocailles, carteles, figures oyseaux et dragon» 1736

=== Painting ===
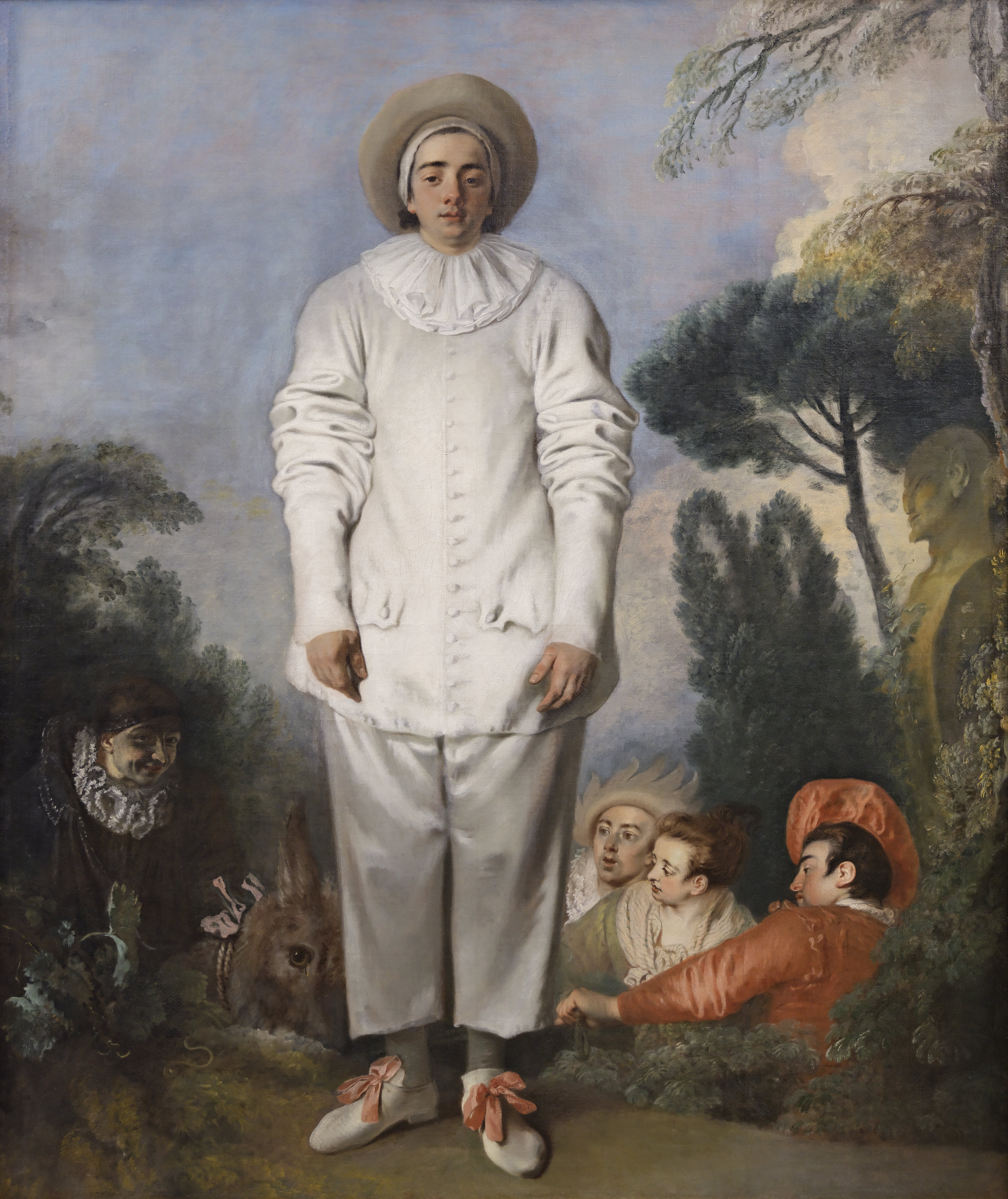
Antoine Watteau, Pierrot, 1718–1719

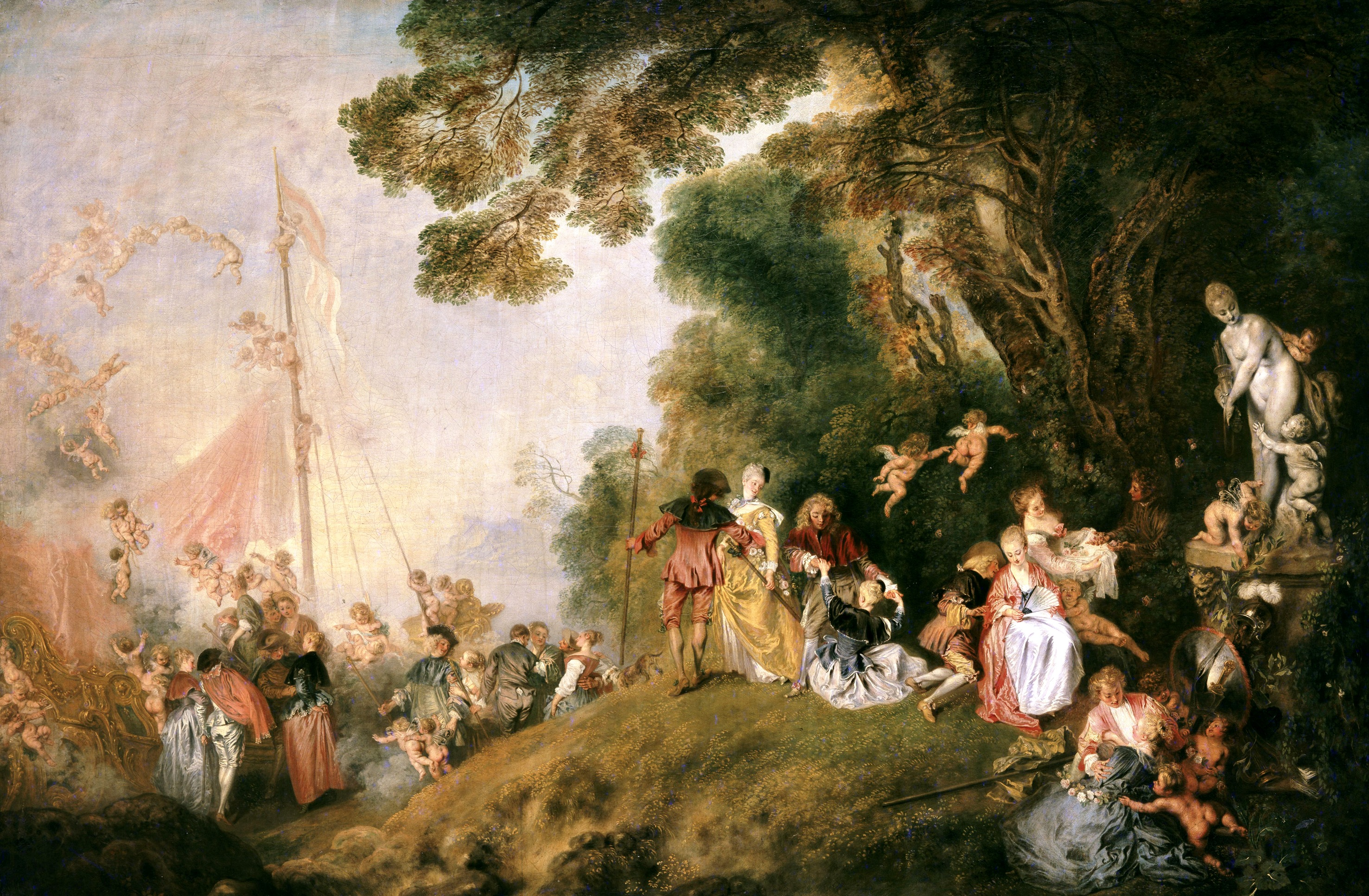
Antoine Watteau, The Embarkation for Cythera, 1718–1721

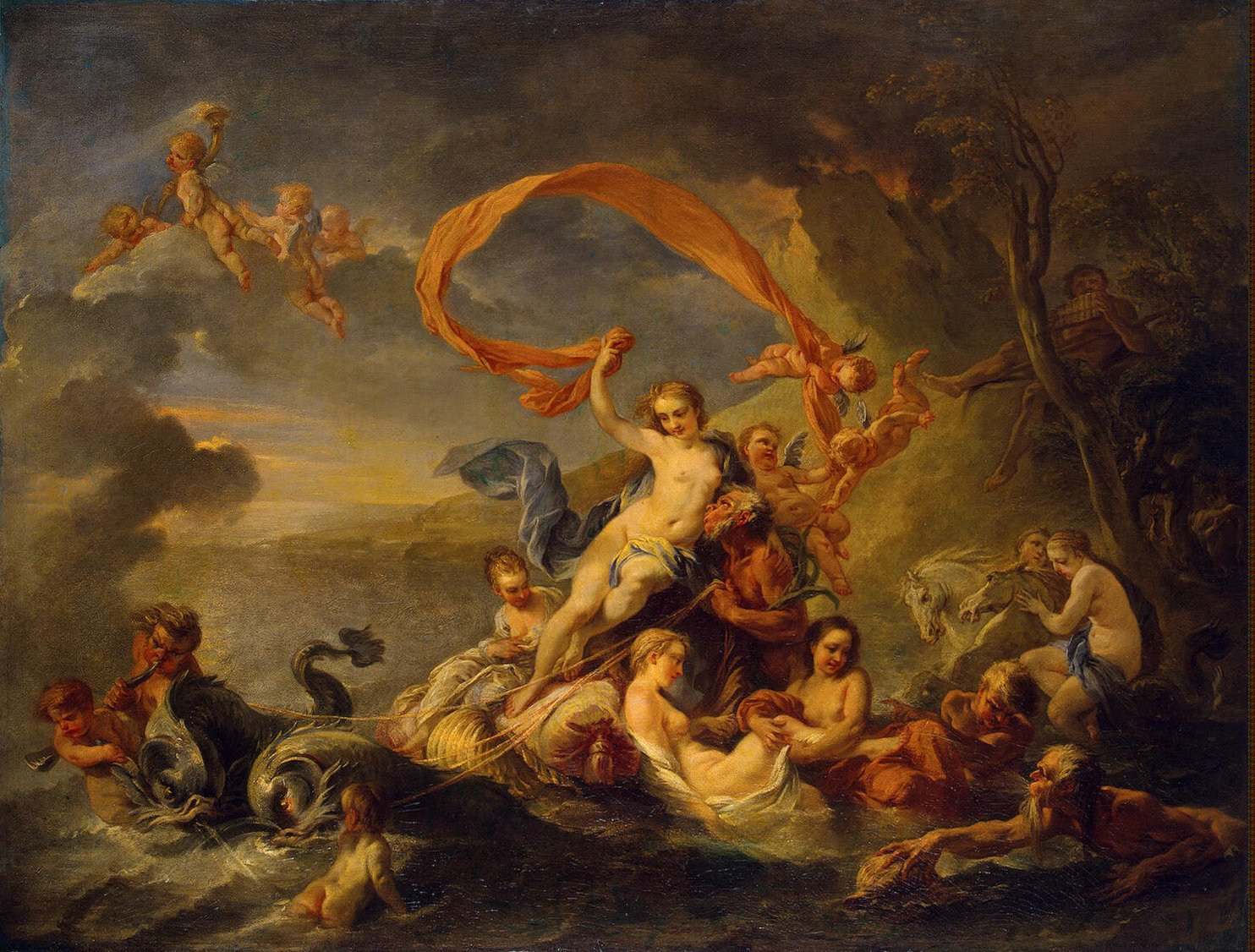
Jean-Baptiste van Loo, The Triumph of Galatea, 1720

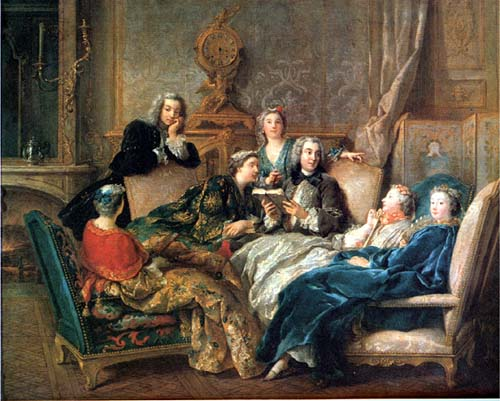
Jean François de Troy, A Reading of Molière, 1728

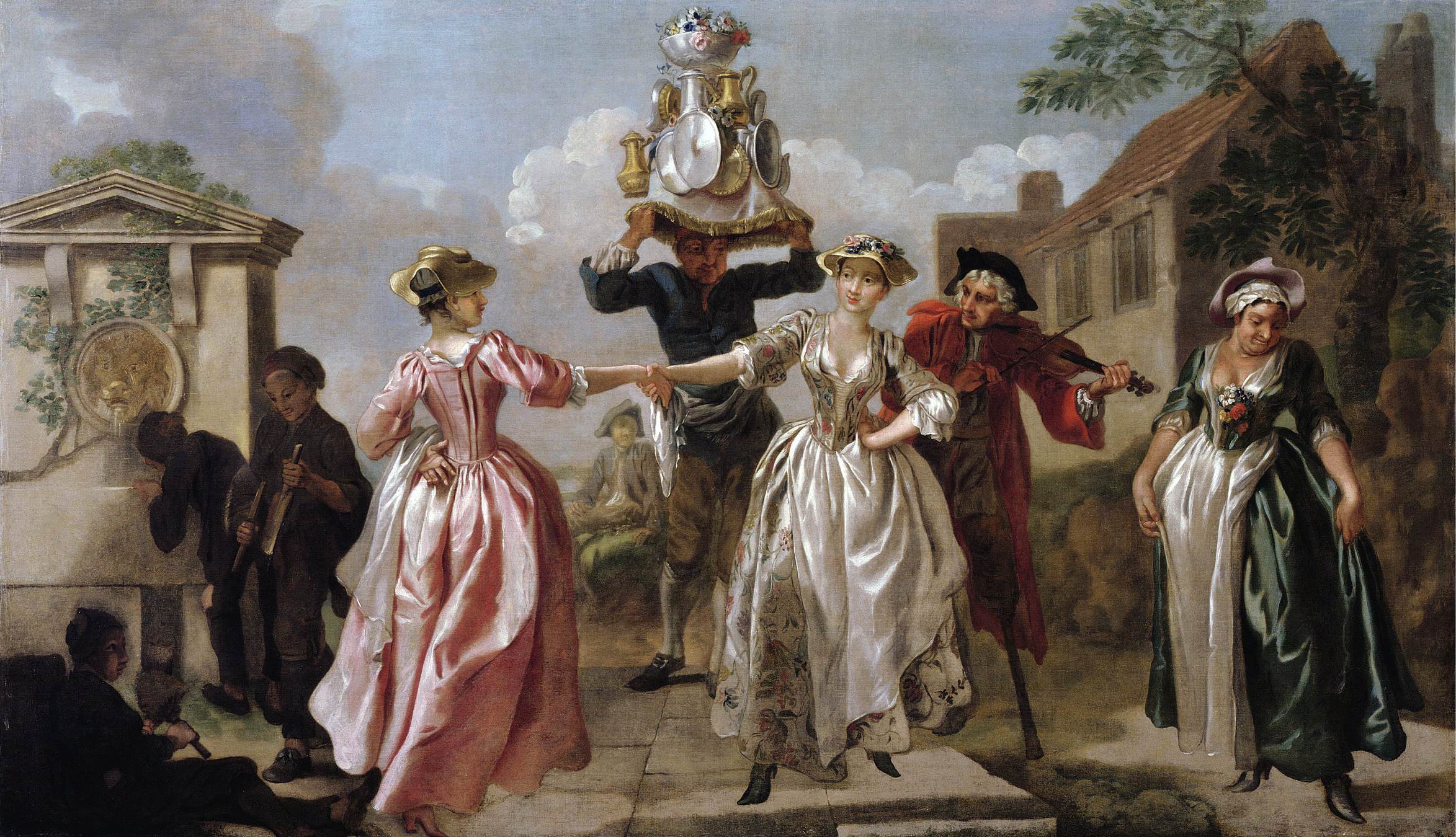
Francis Hayman, Dancing Milkmaids, 1735

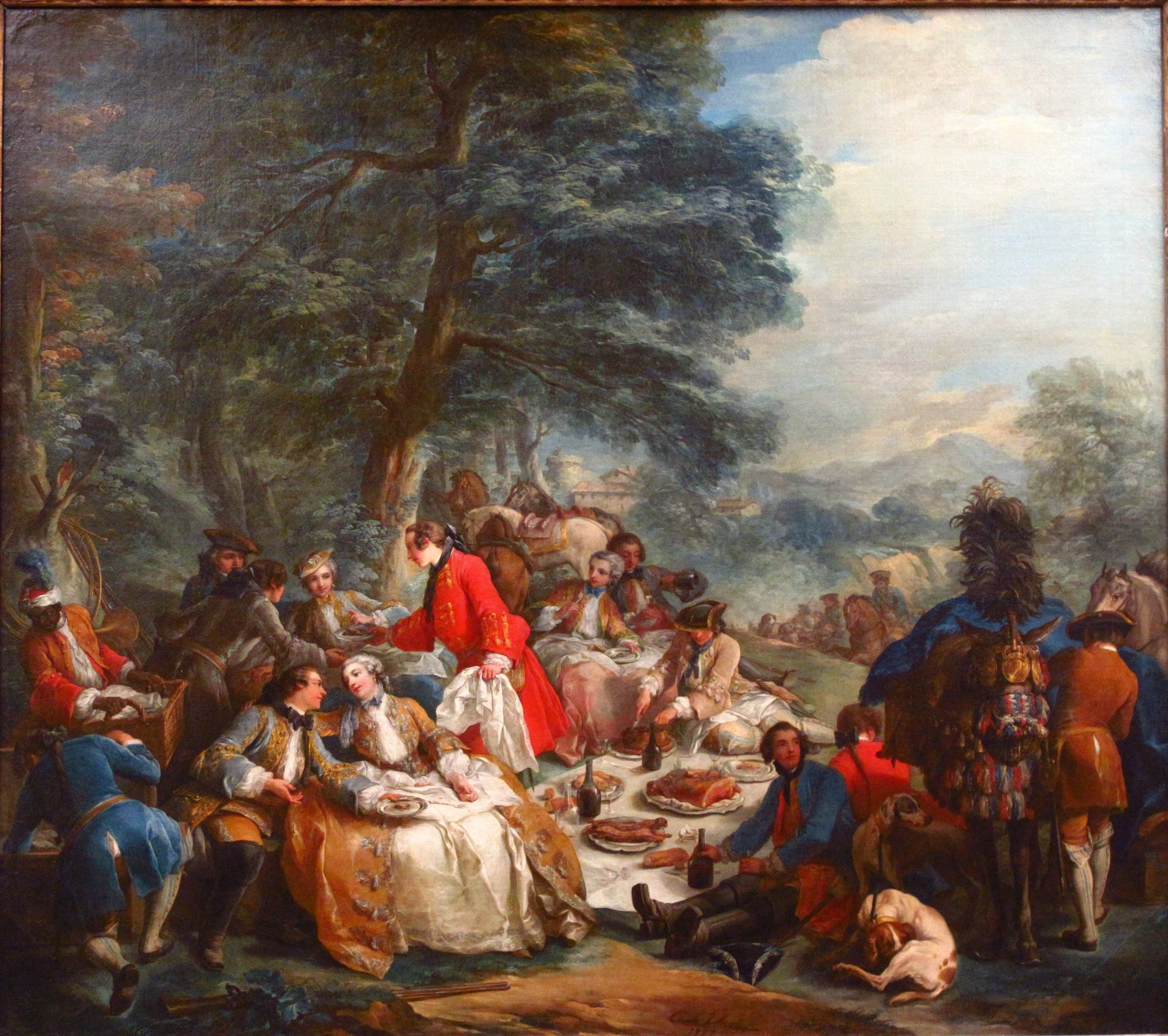
Charles-André van Loo, Halt to the Hunt, 1737

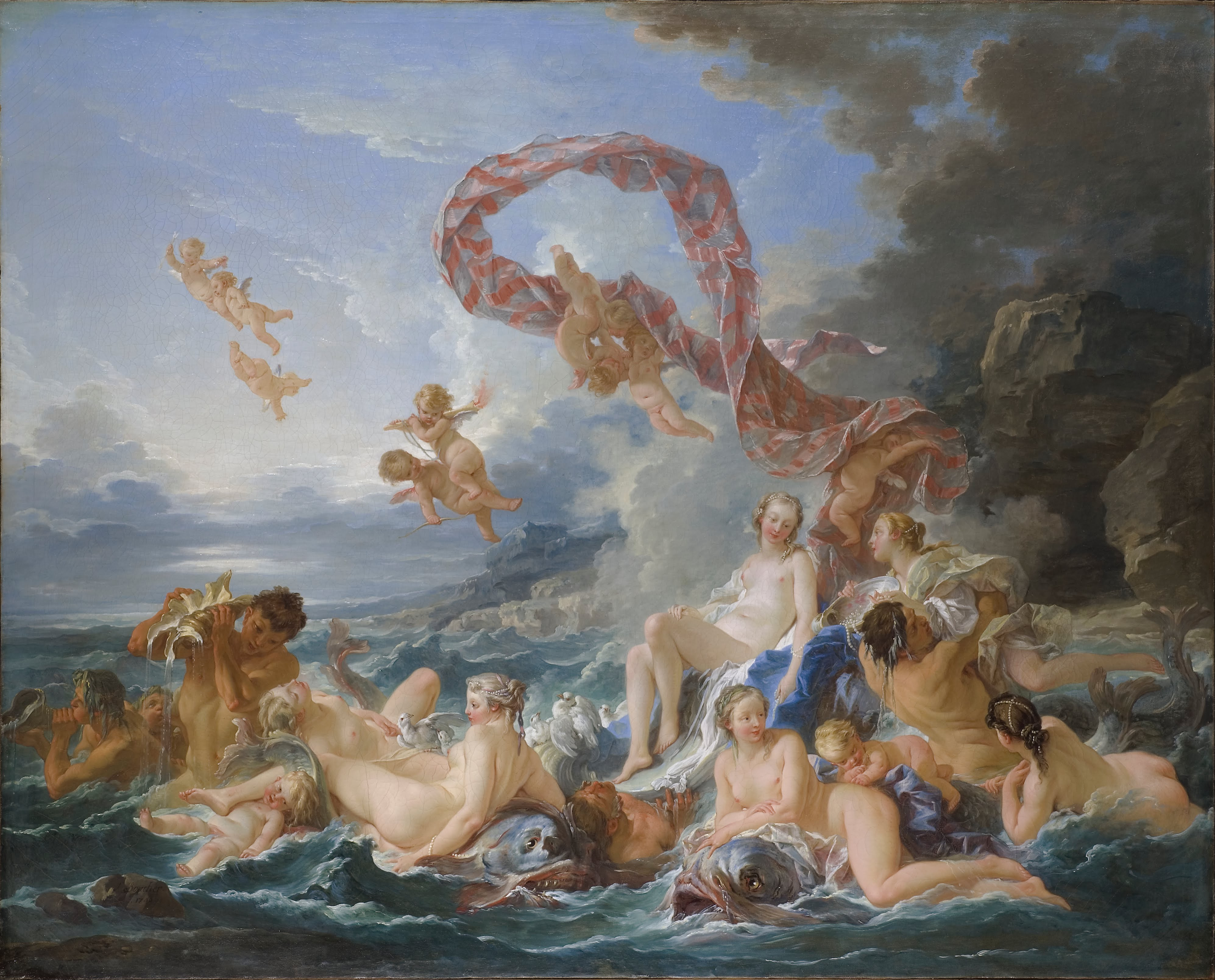
François Boucher, The Triumph of Venus, 1740

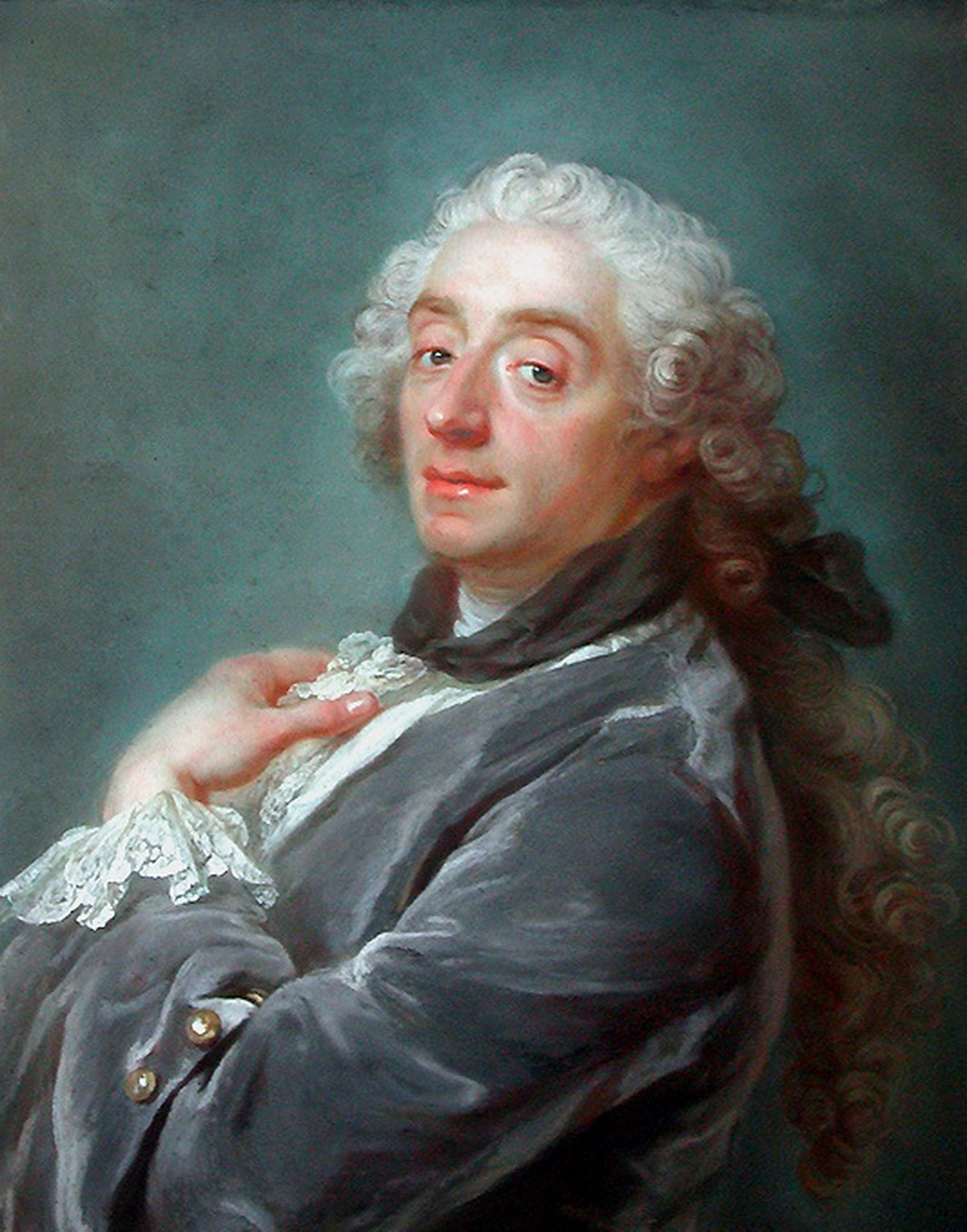
Gustaf Lundberg, Portrait of François Boucher, 1741

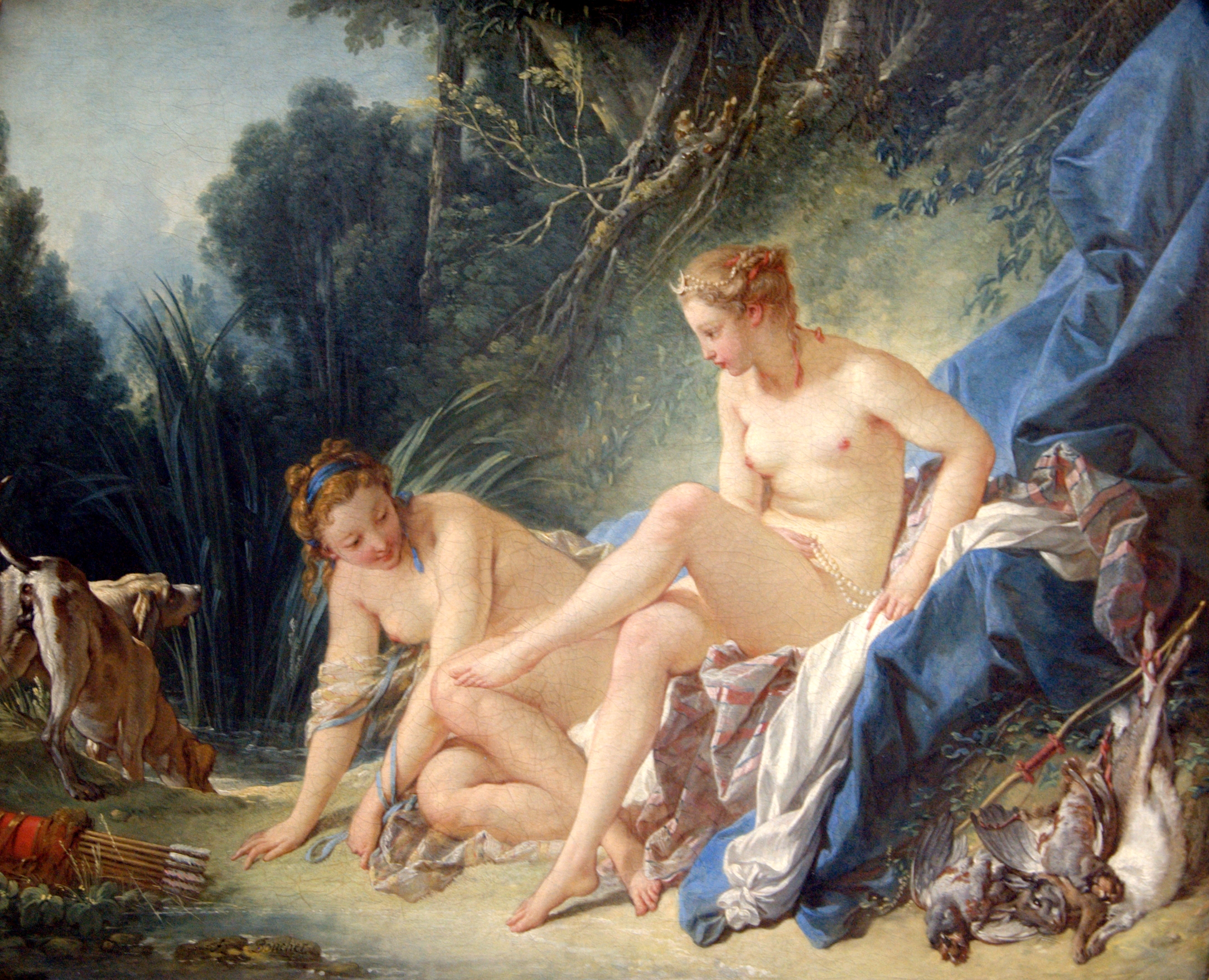
François Boucher, Diana Leaving the Bath, 1742

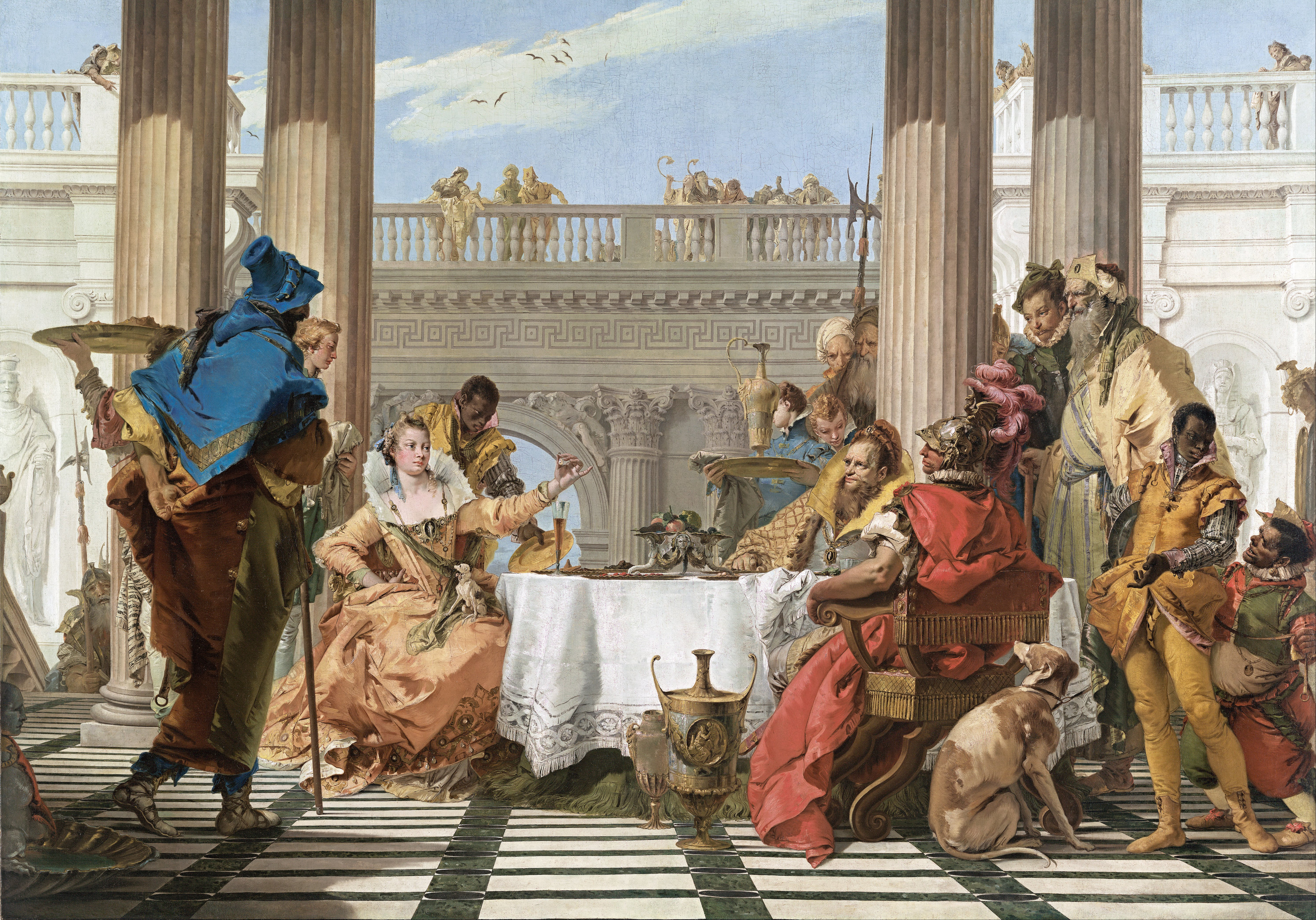
Giovanni Battista Tiepolo, The Banquet of Cleopatra, 1743

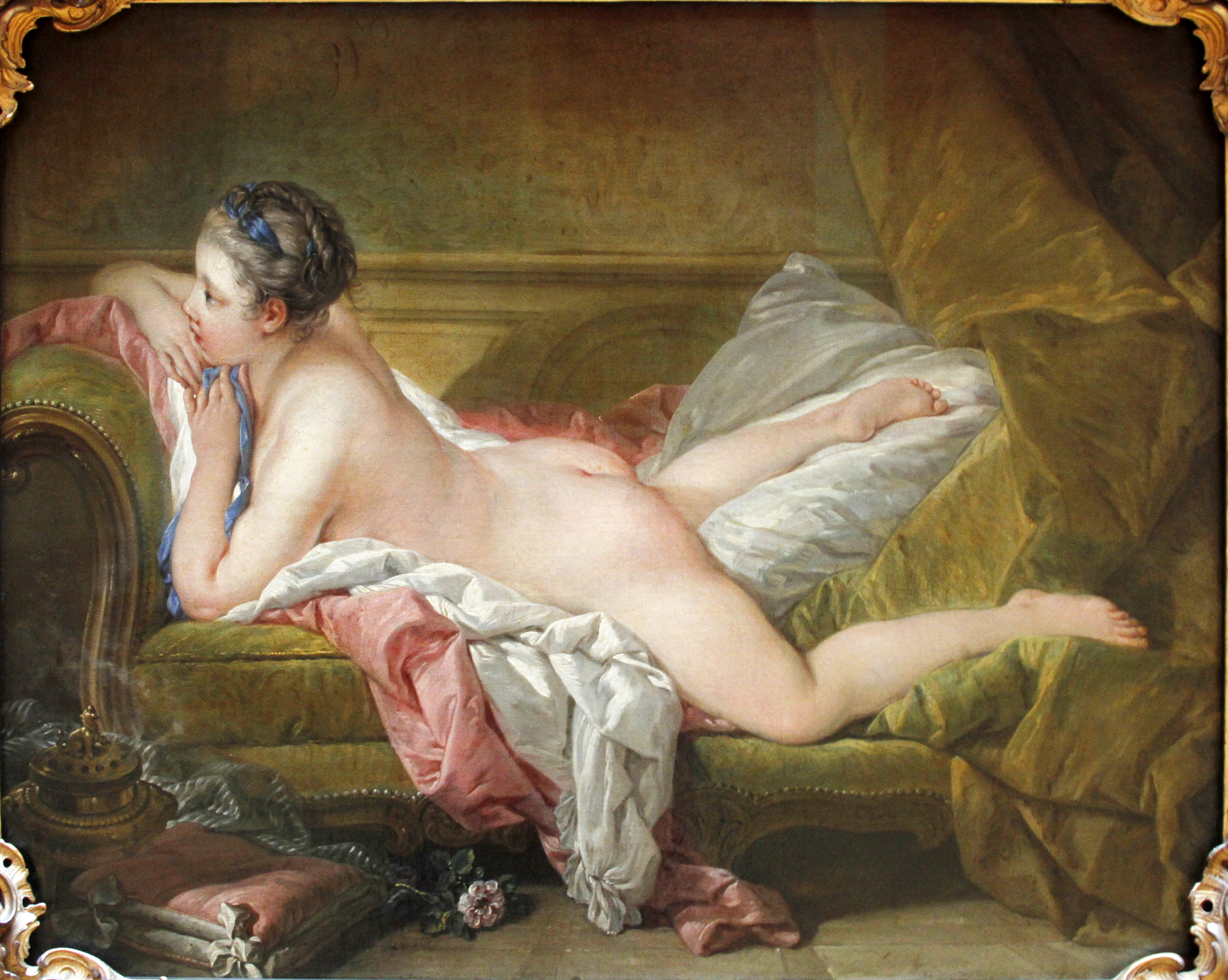
François Boucher, Marie-Louise O'Murphy, 1752

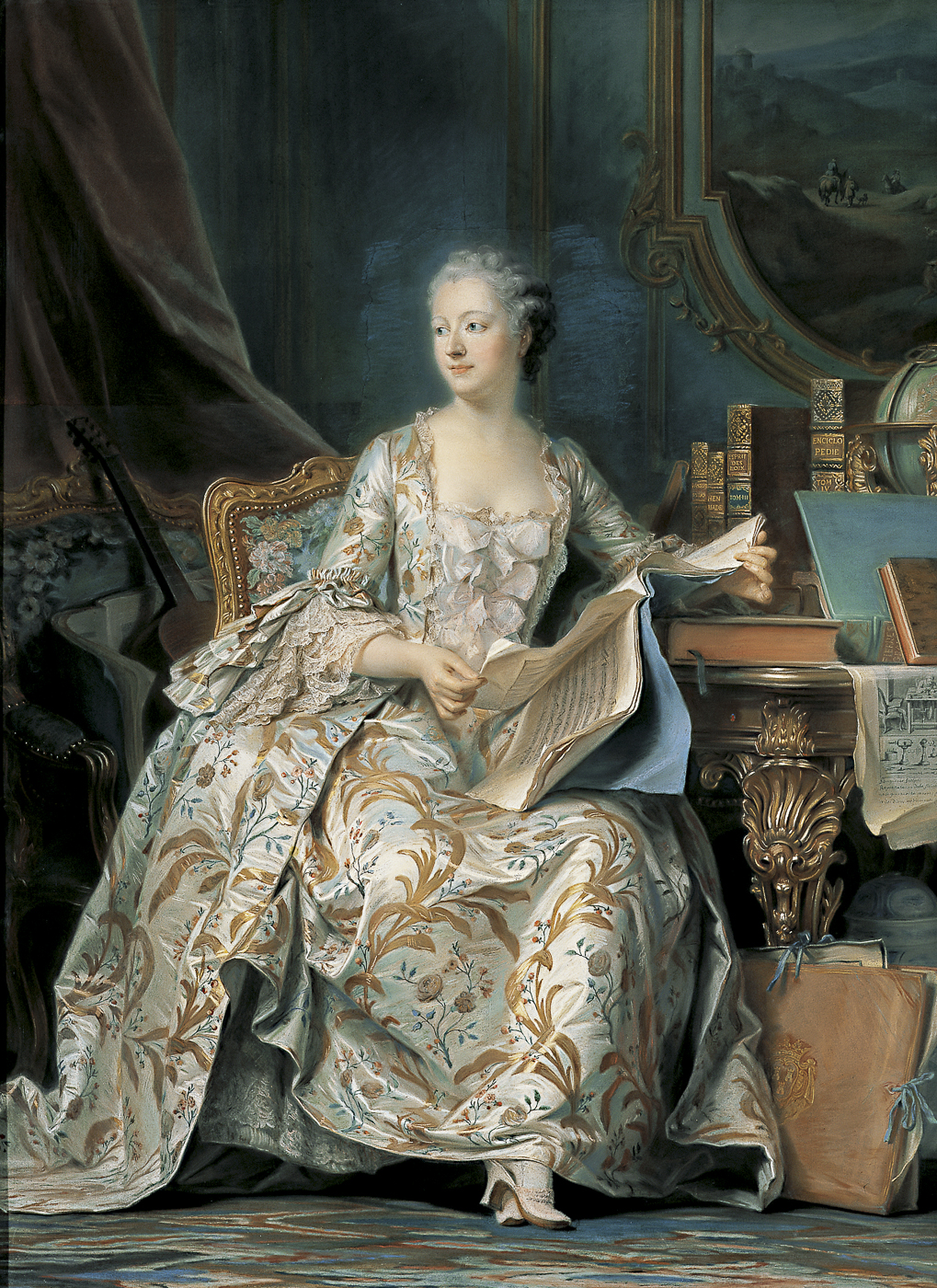
Maurice Quentin de La Tour, Full-length portrait of the Marquise de Pompadour, 1748–1755

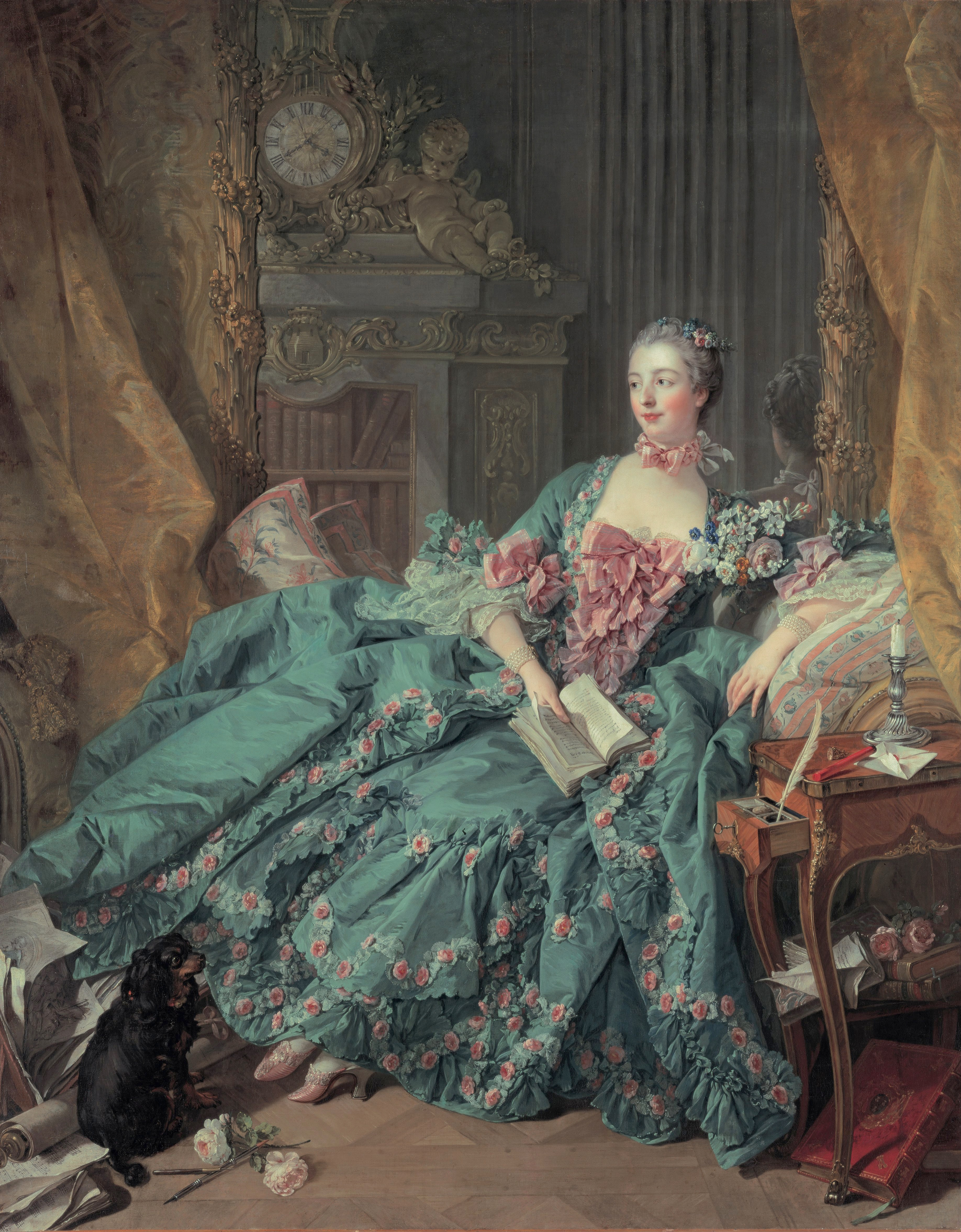
François Boucher Portrait of the Marquise de Pompadour, 1756

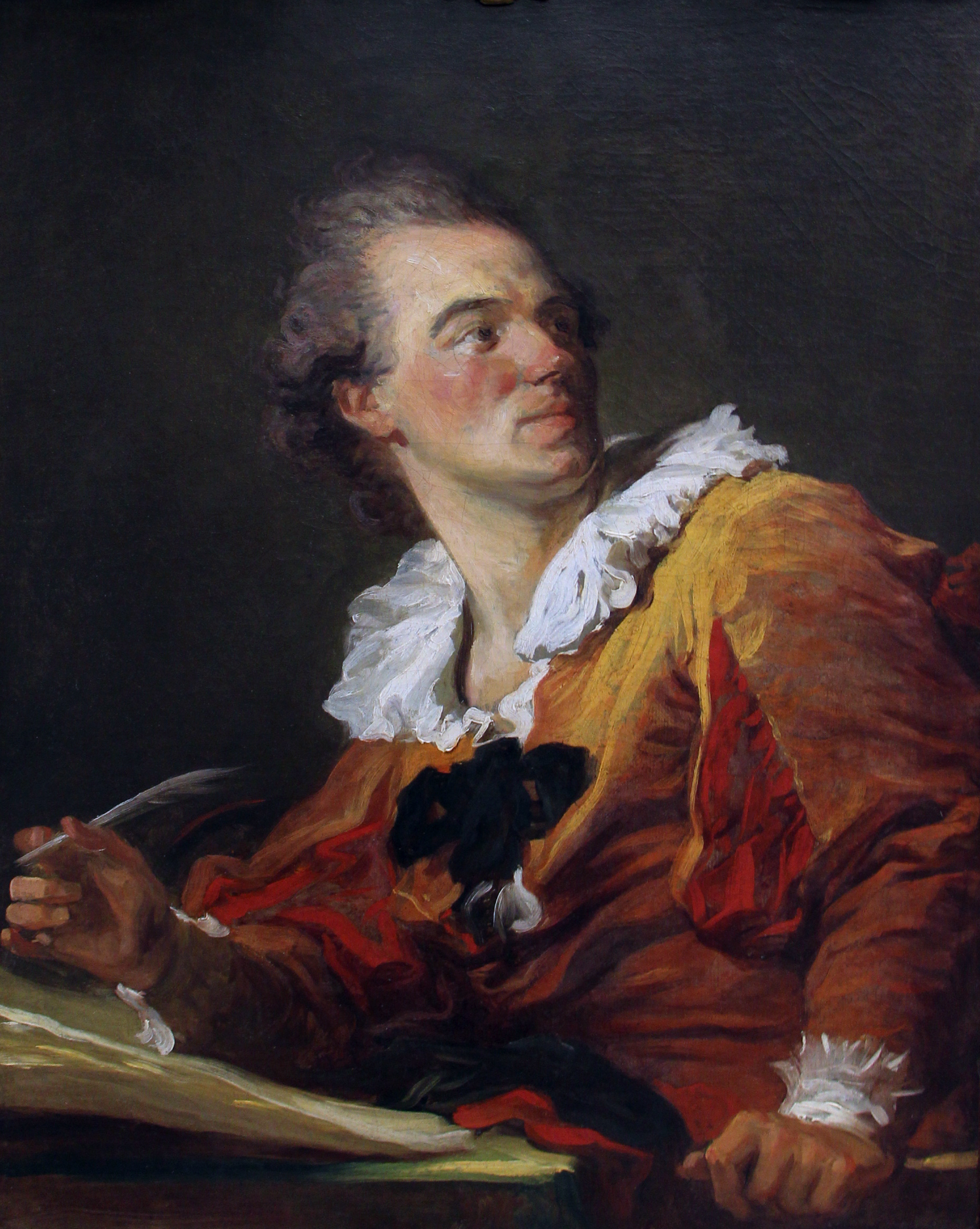
Jean-Honoré Fragonard, Inspiration, 1769

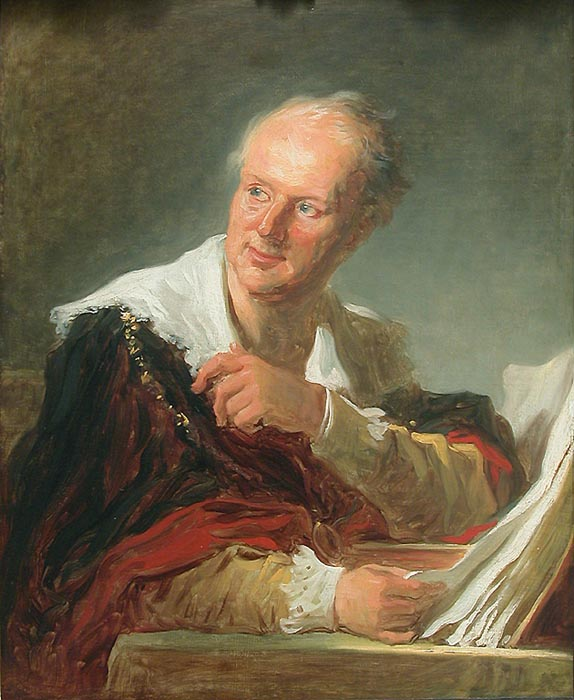
Jean-Honoré Fragonard, Portrait of a man, formerly mistakenly identified as Denis Diderot, 1769

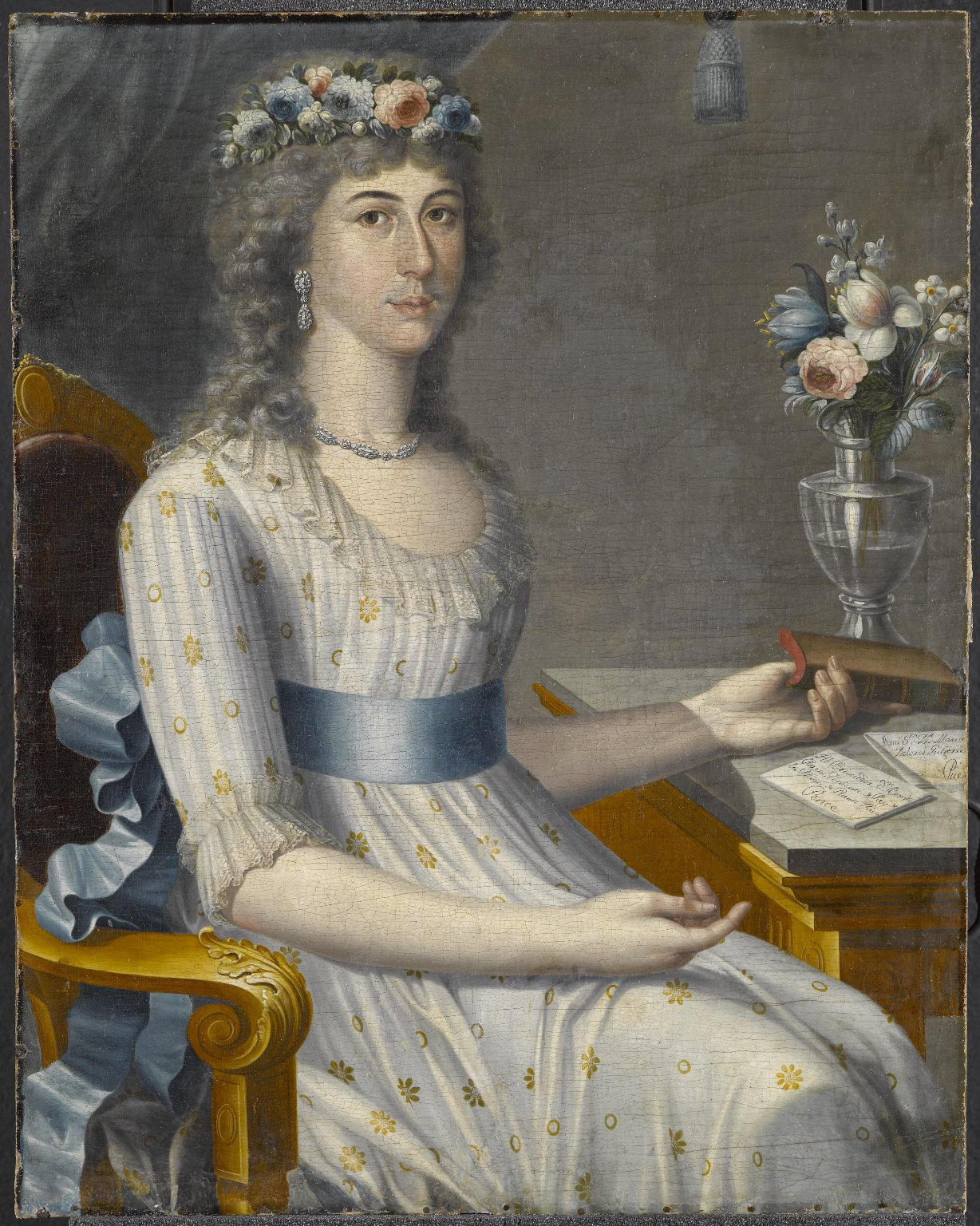
José Campeche, Doña María de los Dolores Gutiérrez del Mazo y Pérez, c. 1796

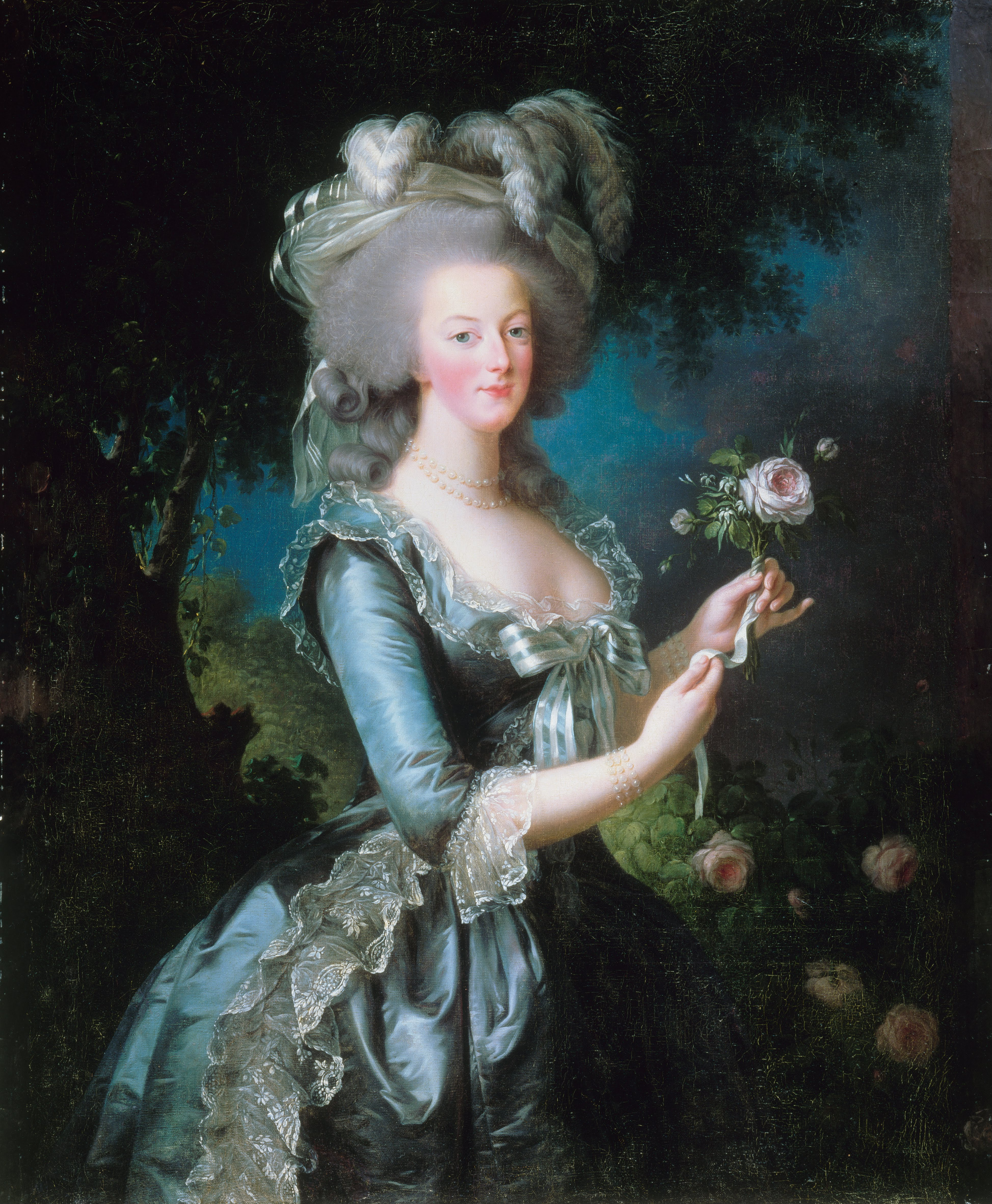
Élisabeth Vigée-Lebrun, Marie Antoinette with a Rose, 1783

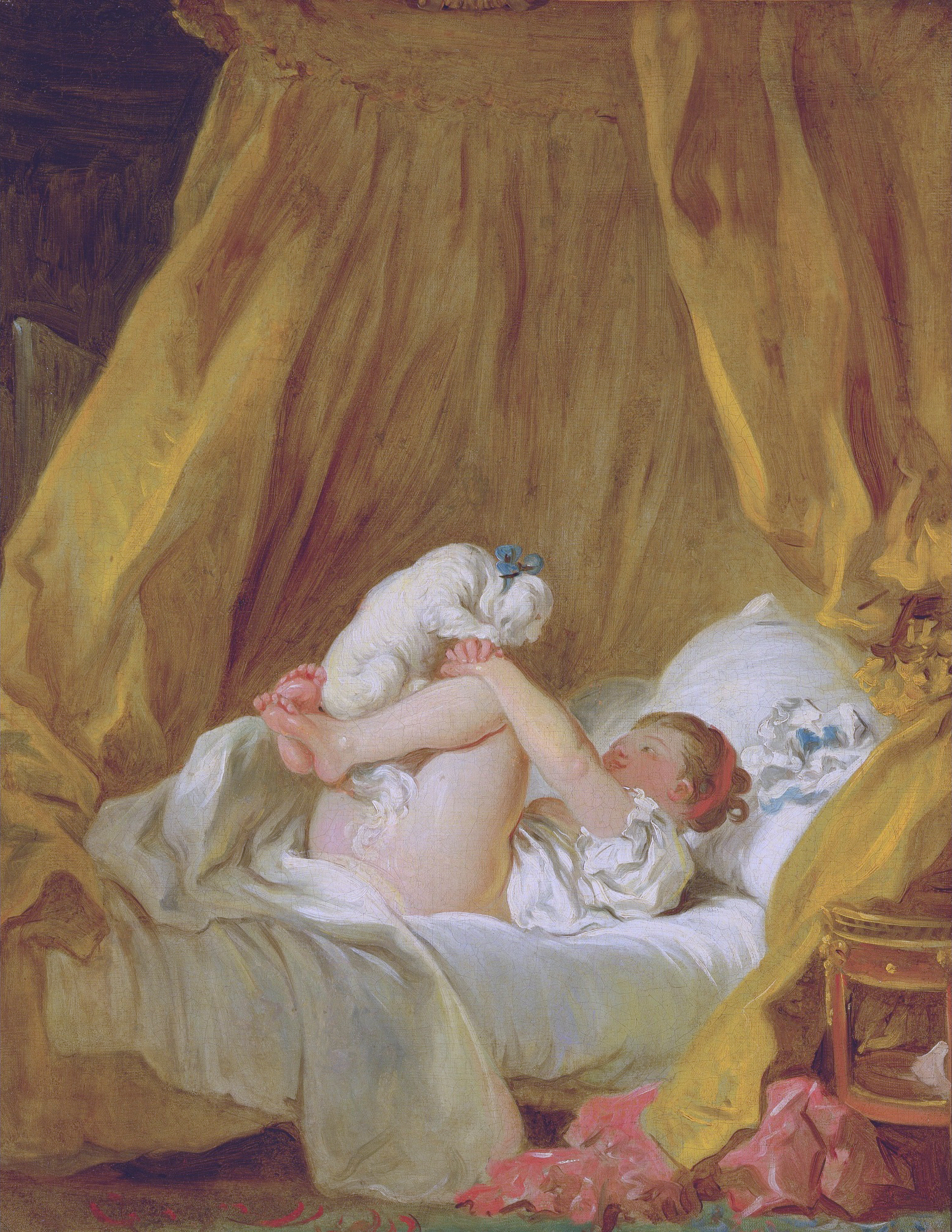
Jean-Honoré Fragonard, La Gimblette, 1770–1775

=== Rococo era painting ===
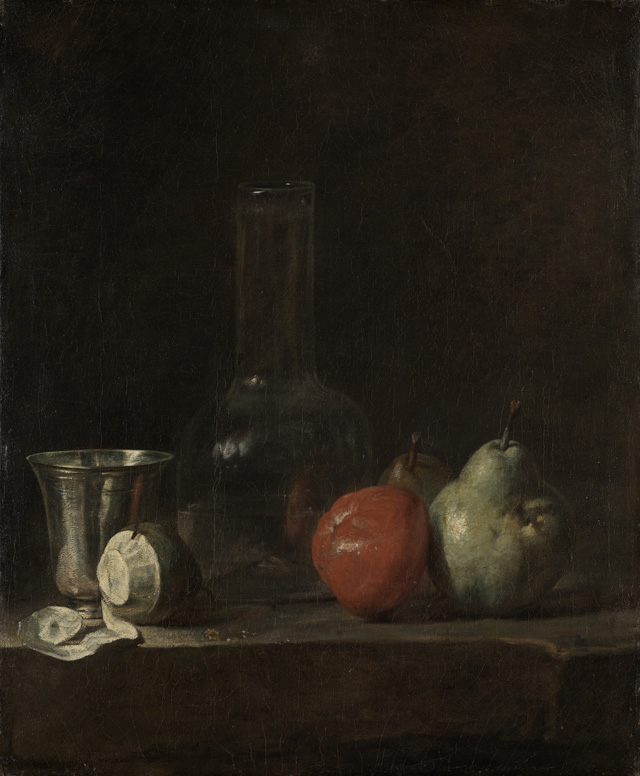
Jean-Baptiste-Siméon Chardin, Still Life with Glass Flask and Fruit, c. 1750

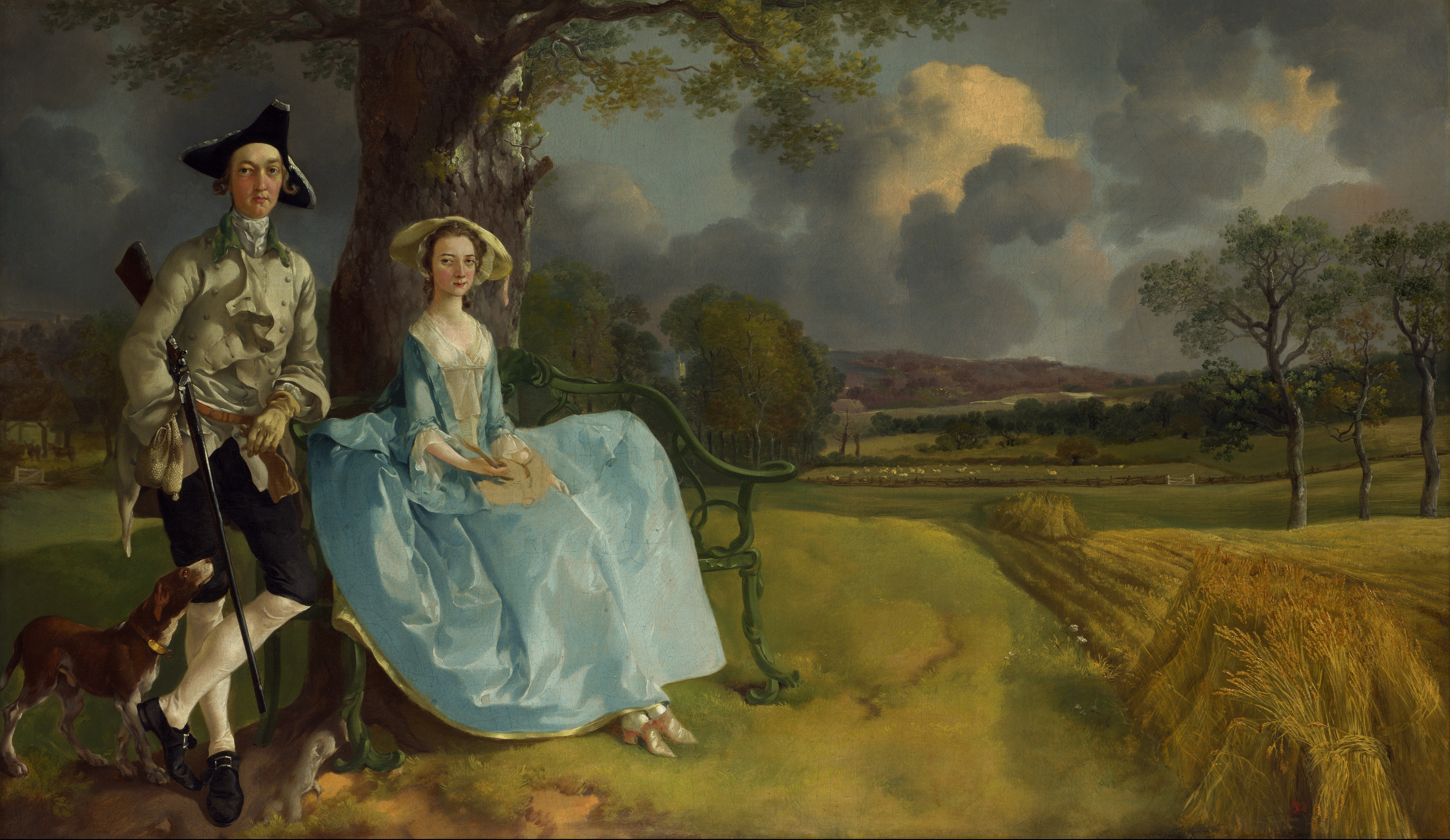
Thomas Gainsborough, Mr and Mrs Andrews, 1750

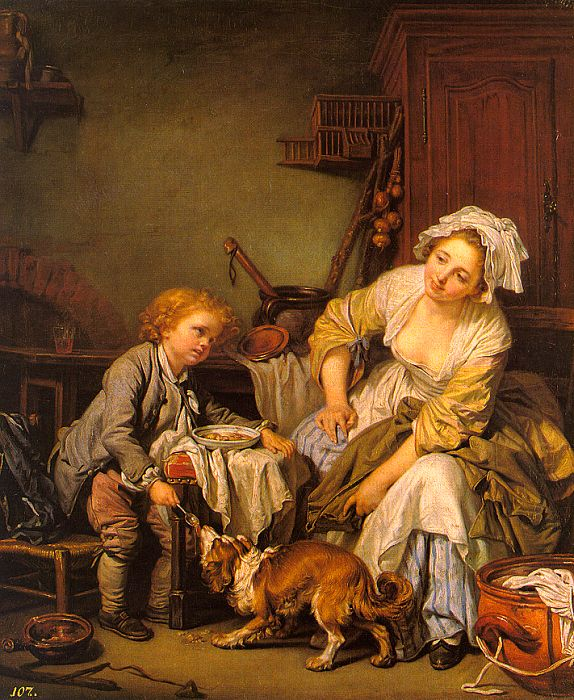
Jean-Baptiste Greuze, The Spoiled Child, c. 1765

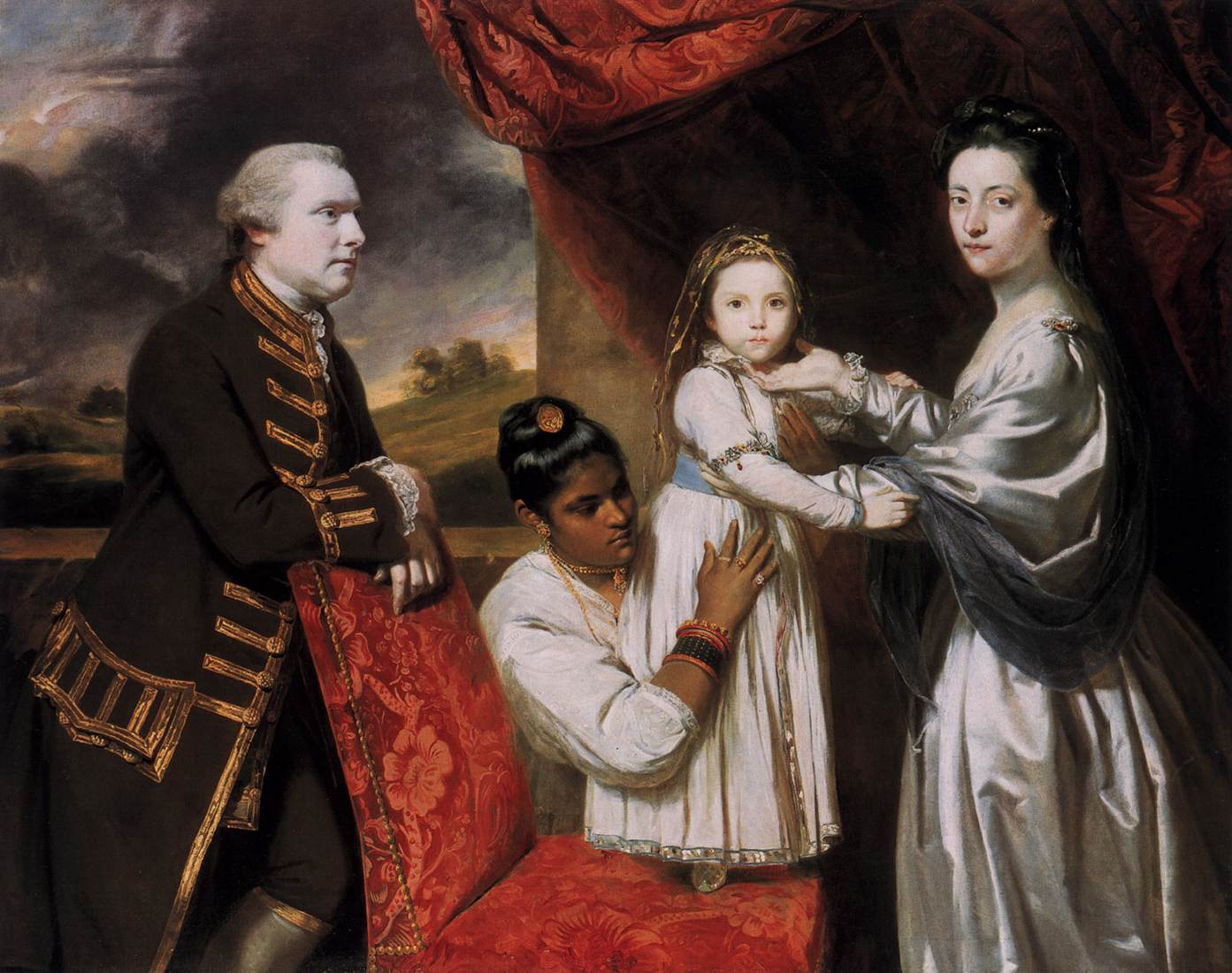
Joshua Reynolds, George Clive and his family with an Indian maid, 1765

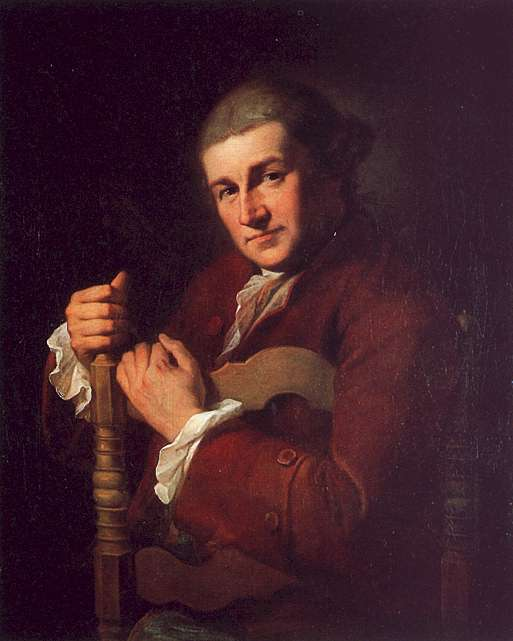
Angelica Kauffman, Portrait of David Garrick, c. 1765

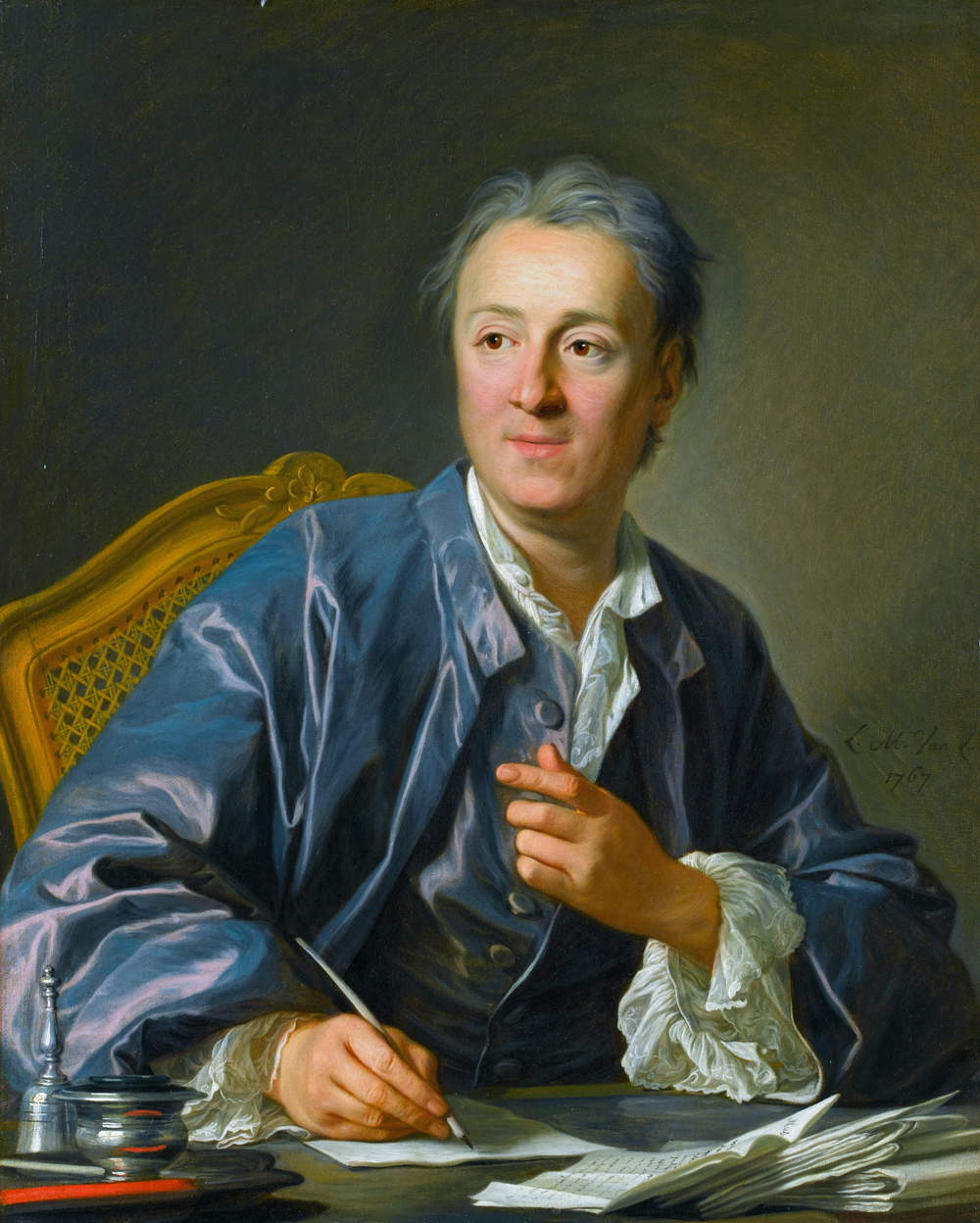
Louis-Michel van Loo, Portrait of Denis Diderot, 1767

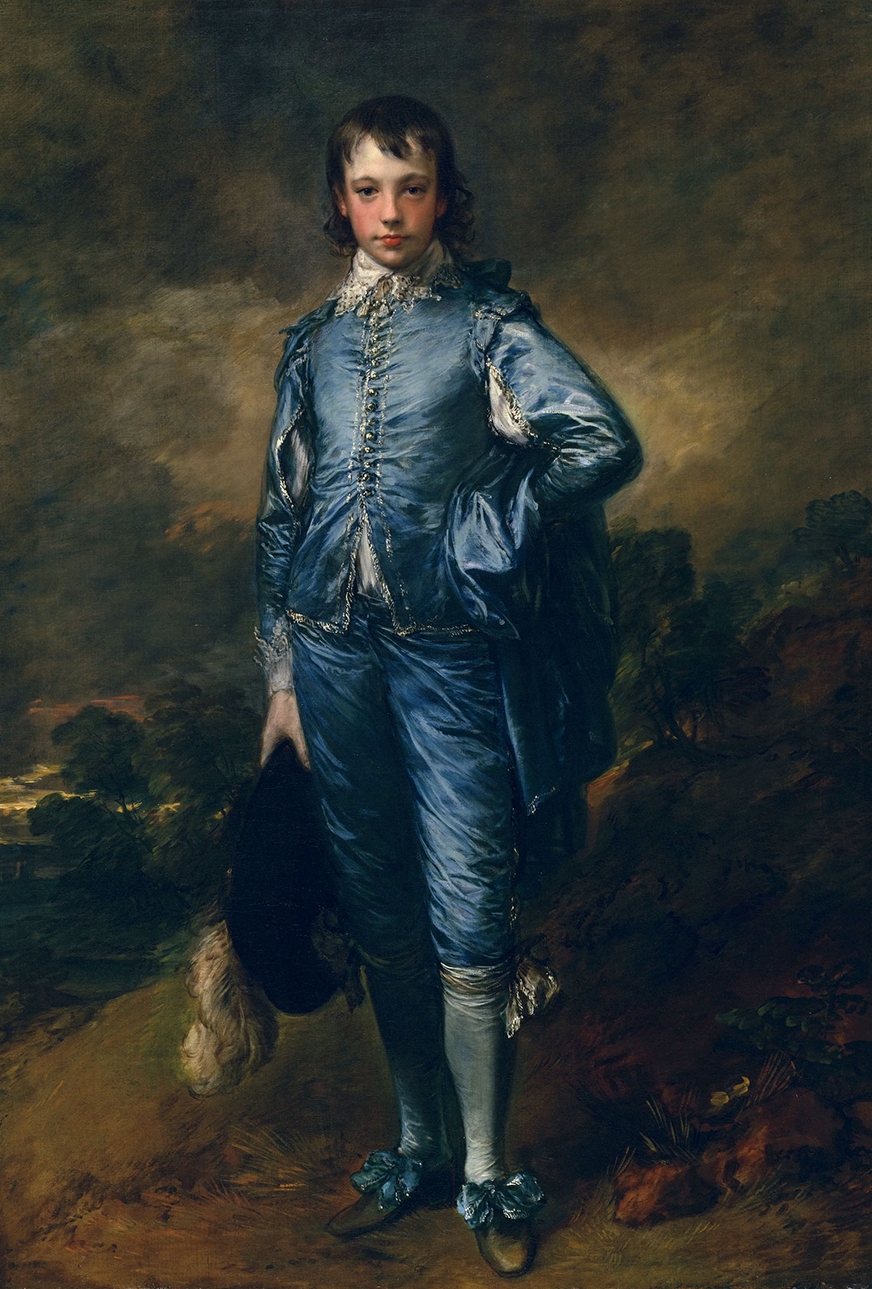
Thomas Gainsborough, The Blue Boy, 1770

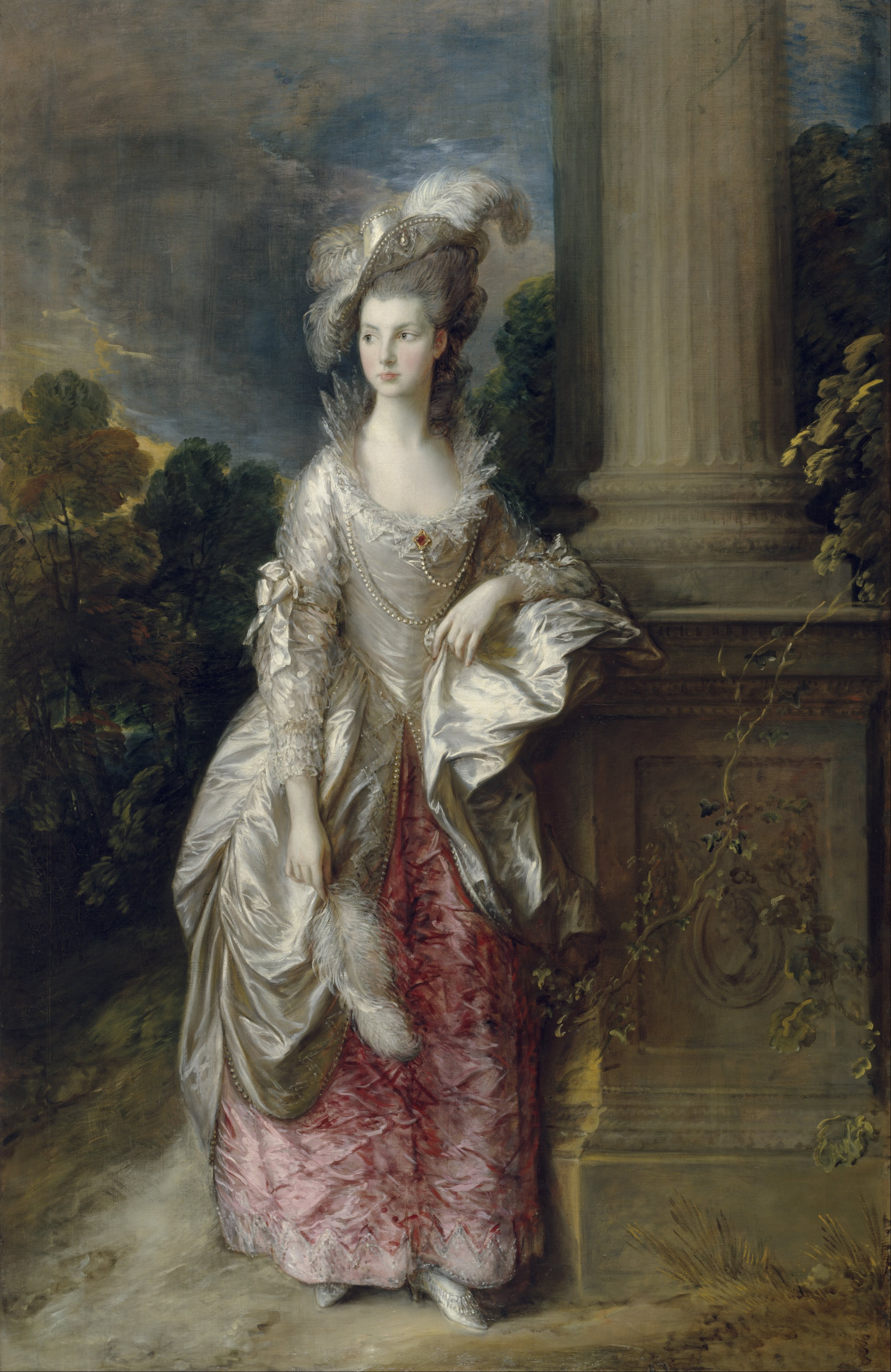
Thomas Gainsborough, Portrait of Mrs Mary Graham, 1777

== See also ==
- Italian Rococo art
- Rococo painting
- Rococo in Portugal
- Rococo in Spain
- Cultural movement
- Gilded woodcarving
- History of painting
- Timeline of Italian artists to 1800
- Illusionistic ceiling painting
- Louis XV style
- Louis XV furniture
- Liège–Aachen Baroque furniture

== Bibliography ==
- Bailey, Gauvin Alexander (2014). The Spiritual Rococo: Décor and Divinity from the Salons of Paris to the Missions of Patagonia. Farnham: Ashgate.
- Baldick, Chris (2015). "Rococo". The Oxford Dictionary of Literary Terms (Online Version) (4th ed.). Oxford University Press. ISBN 9780191783234.
- Cabanne, Perre (1988). L'Art Classique et le Baroque. Paris: Larousse. ISBN 978-2-03-583324-2.
- Dictionnaire Historique de Paris. Le Livre de Poche. 2013. ISBN 978-2-253-13140-3.
- Droguet, Anne (2004). Les Styles Transition et Louis XVI. Les Editions de l'Amateur. ISBN 2-85917-406-0.
- Duby, Georges; Daval, Jean-Luc (2013). La Sculpture de l'Antiquité au XX^{e} siècle (in French). Cologne: Taschen. ISBN 978-3-8365-4483-2. French translation from German.
- Ducher, Robert (1988). Caractéristique des Styles. Paris: Flammarion. ISBN 2-08-011539-1.
- Ermatinger, Emil (1928). Barock und Rokoko in der deutschen Dichtung (in German). Leipzig; Berlin: B. G. Teubner.
- Fierro, Alfred (1996). Histoire et dictionnaire de Paris. Robert Laffont. ISBN 2-221--07862-4.
- Graur, Neaga (1970). Stiluri în arta decorativă (in Romanian). Cerces.
- Hopkins, Owen (2014). Les styles en architecture. Dunod. ISBN 978-2-10-070689-1.
- Kimball, Fiske (1980) [1943]. The Creation of the Rococo Decorative Style. New York: Dover Publications. ISBN 978-0-486-23989-7.
- de Morant, Henry (1970). Histoire des arts décoratifs. Librairie Hachette.
- Prina, Francesca; Demartini, Elena (2006). Petite encylopédie de l'architecture. Paris: Solar. ISBN 2-263-04096-X.
- Renault, Christophe (2006). Les Styles de l'architecture et du mobilier. Paris: Gisserot. ISBN 978-2-877-4746-58.
- Texier, Simon (2012). Paris- Panorama de l'architecture de l'Antiquité à nos jours. Paris: Parigramme. ISBN 978-2-84096-667-8.
- Vila, Marie Christine (2006). Paris Musique- Huit Siècles d'histoire. Paris: Parigramme. ISBN 978-2-84096-419-3.
