= Rocaille =

French style of exuberant decoration

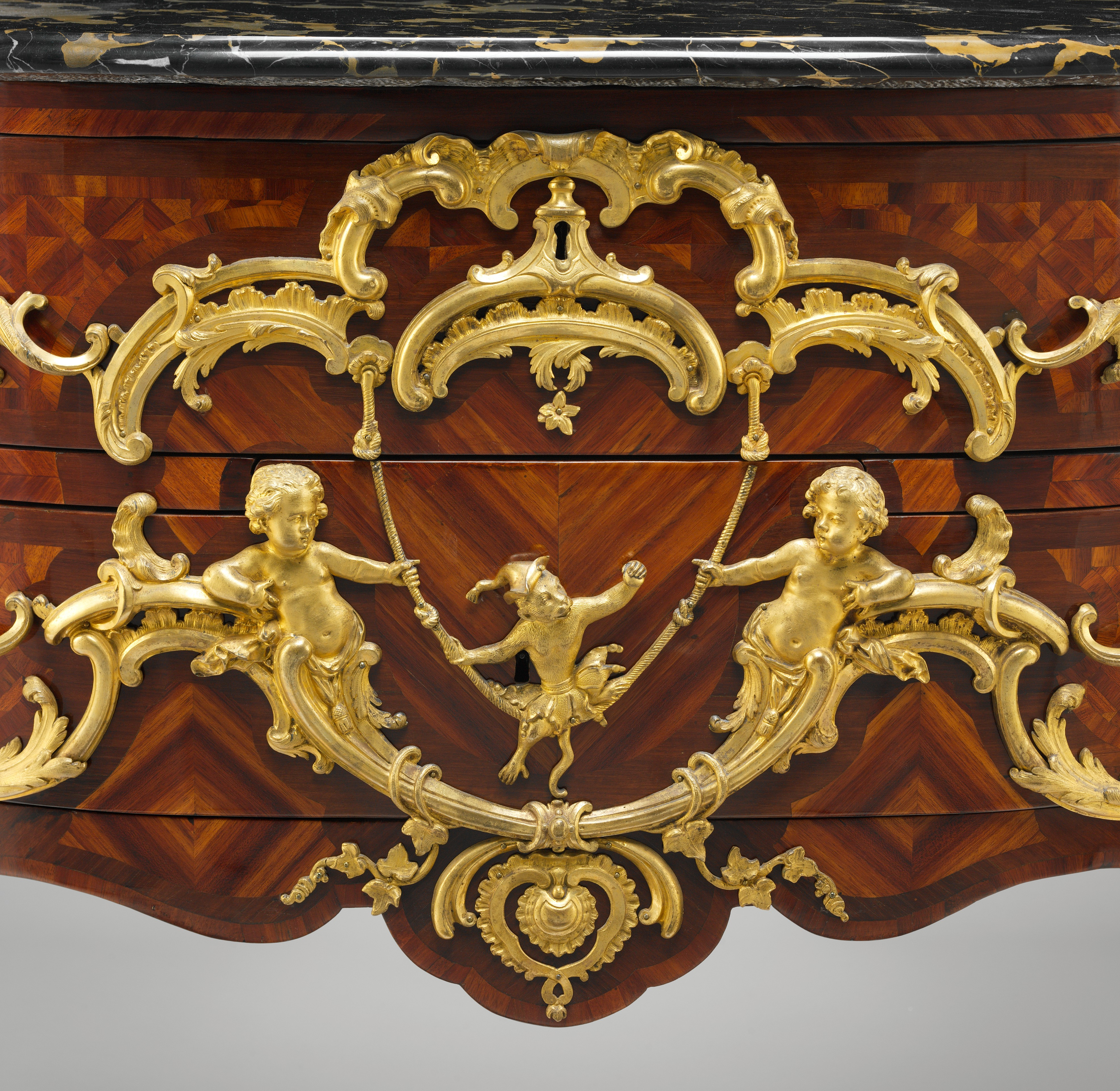
Commode decoration by Charles Cressent (1745–1749), Metropolitan Museum

Rocaille (US: /roʊˈkaɪ, rɒˈkaɪ/ ro(h)-KY, French: [ʁɔkɑj]) was a French style of elaborate design that appeared in furniture and interior decoration during the early reign of Louis XV. A reaction against the heaviness and formality of the Louis XIV style, it featured an abundance of curves, counter-curves, undulations, and elements modeled on nature. Beginning around 1710, it reached its peak in the 1730s, and came to an end in the late 1750s when it was replaced by Neoclassicism. It marked the beginning of the French Baroque movement in furniture and design, as well as the beginning of the Rococo movement, which had spread to Italy, Bavaria, and Austria by the mid-18th century.

== Overview ==
Rocaille was exuberant and inspired by nature like Rococo, but, unlike Rococo, it was usually symmetrical and not overloaded with decoration. It took its name from the mixture of rock, seashell and plaster that was used to create a picturesque effect in grottos during the Renaissance, and from the name of a seashell-shaped ornament which was frequent feature of Rocaille decoration. In 1736, the designer and jeweler Jean Mondon published the Premier Livre: De forme Rocquaille et Cartel, a collection of designs for ornaments of furniture and interior decoration. It was the first appearance in print of the term rocaille to designate the style.

The style was used particularly in salons, a new style of room designed to impress and entertain guests. The most prominent example was the salon of the Princess in Hôtel de Soubise in Paris, designed by Germain Boffrand and Charles-Joseph Natoire (1735–1740). The characteristics of French Rococo included exceptional artistry, especially in the complex frames made for mirrors and paintings, which sculpted in plaster and often gilded; sinuous curves and counter-cures, and the use of vegetal forms (vines, leaves, flowers) intertwined in complex designs. The leading furniture designers in the style included Juste-Aurele Meissonier and Charles Cressent, along with the wood craftsman Nicolas Pineau.

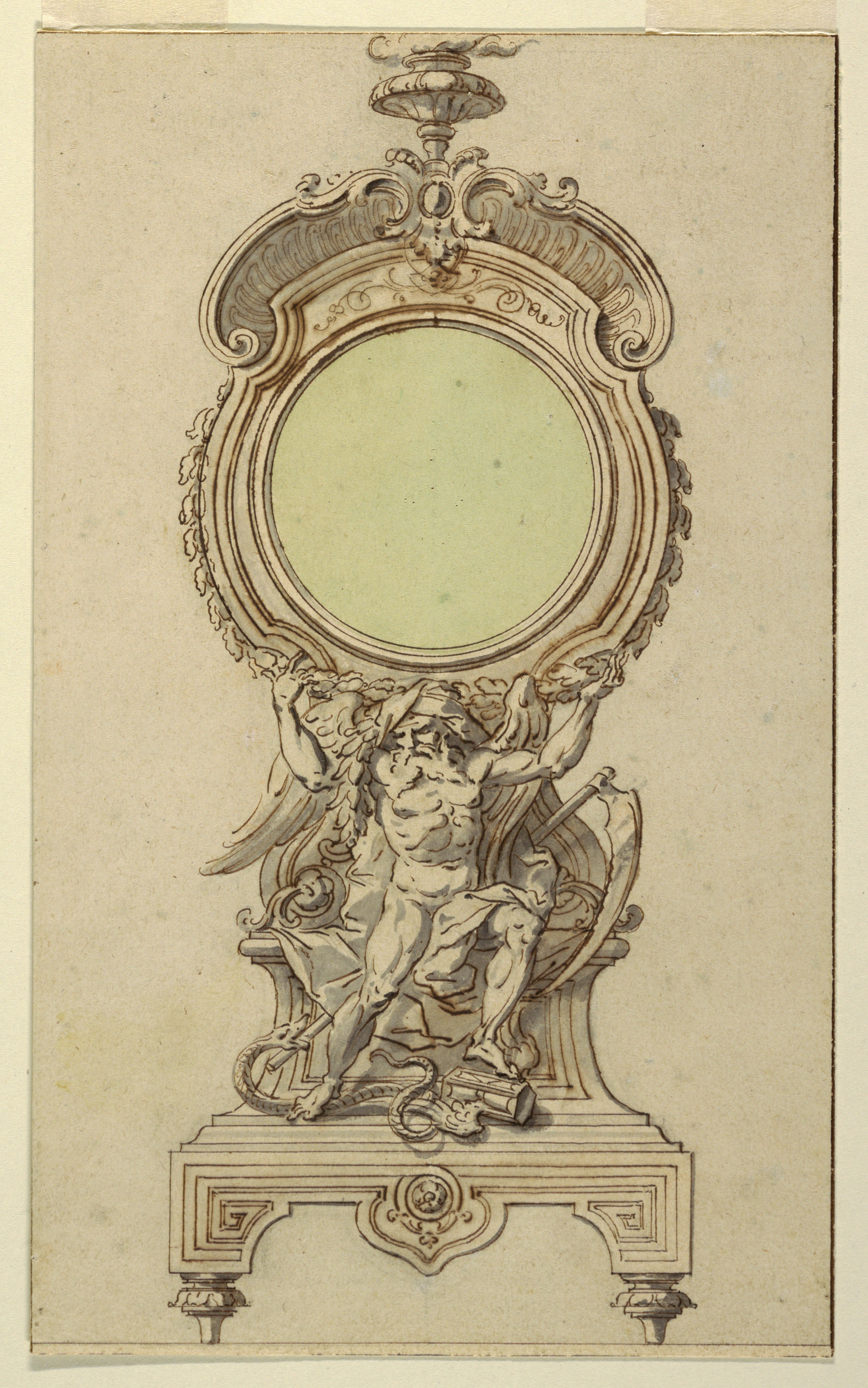
Design for a clock case by Gilles-Marie Oppenordt (1715)

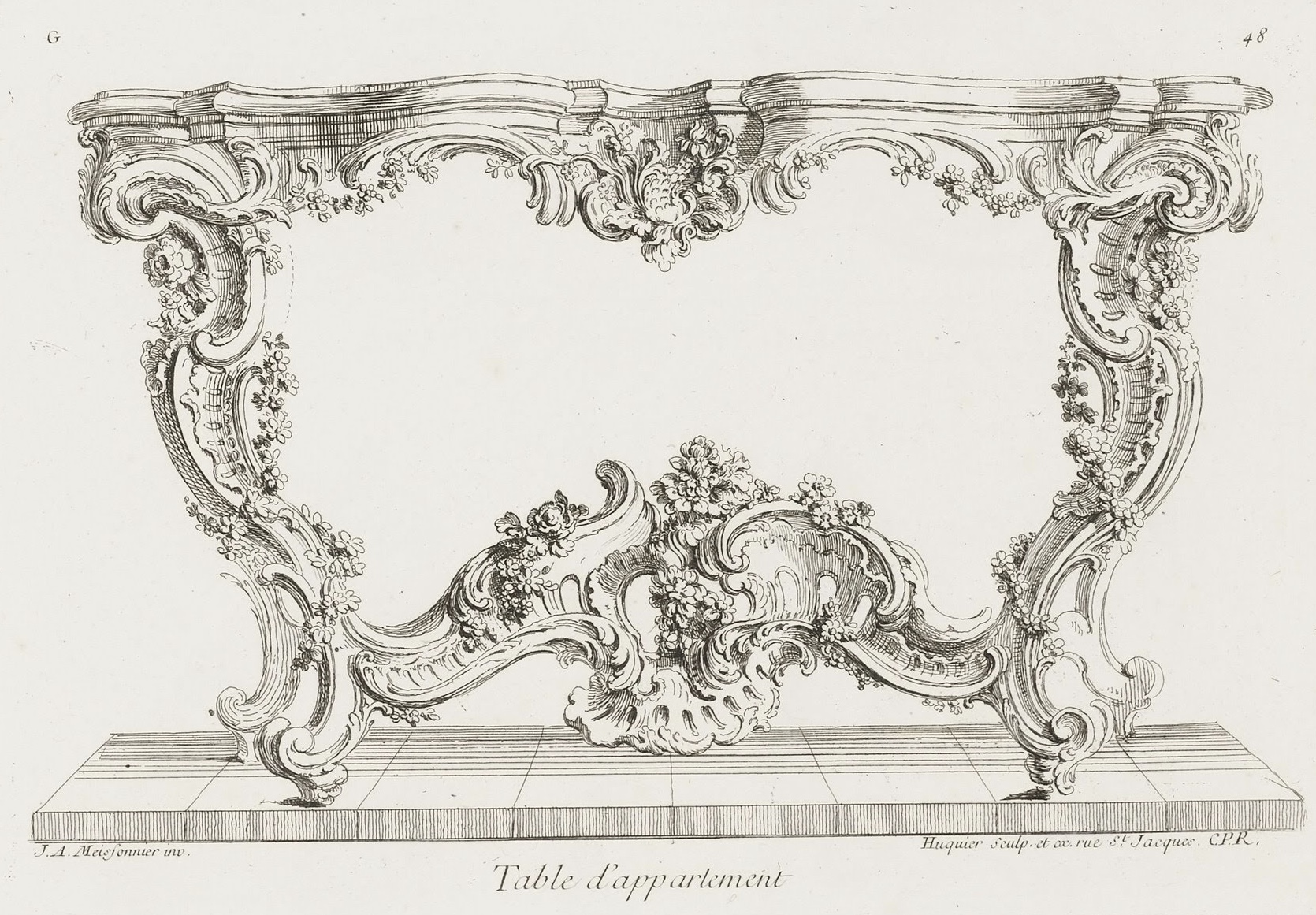
Table design by Juste-Aurele Meissonier (c. 1730)

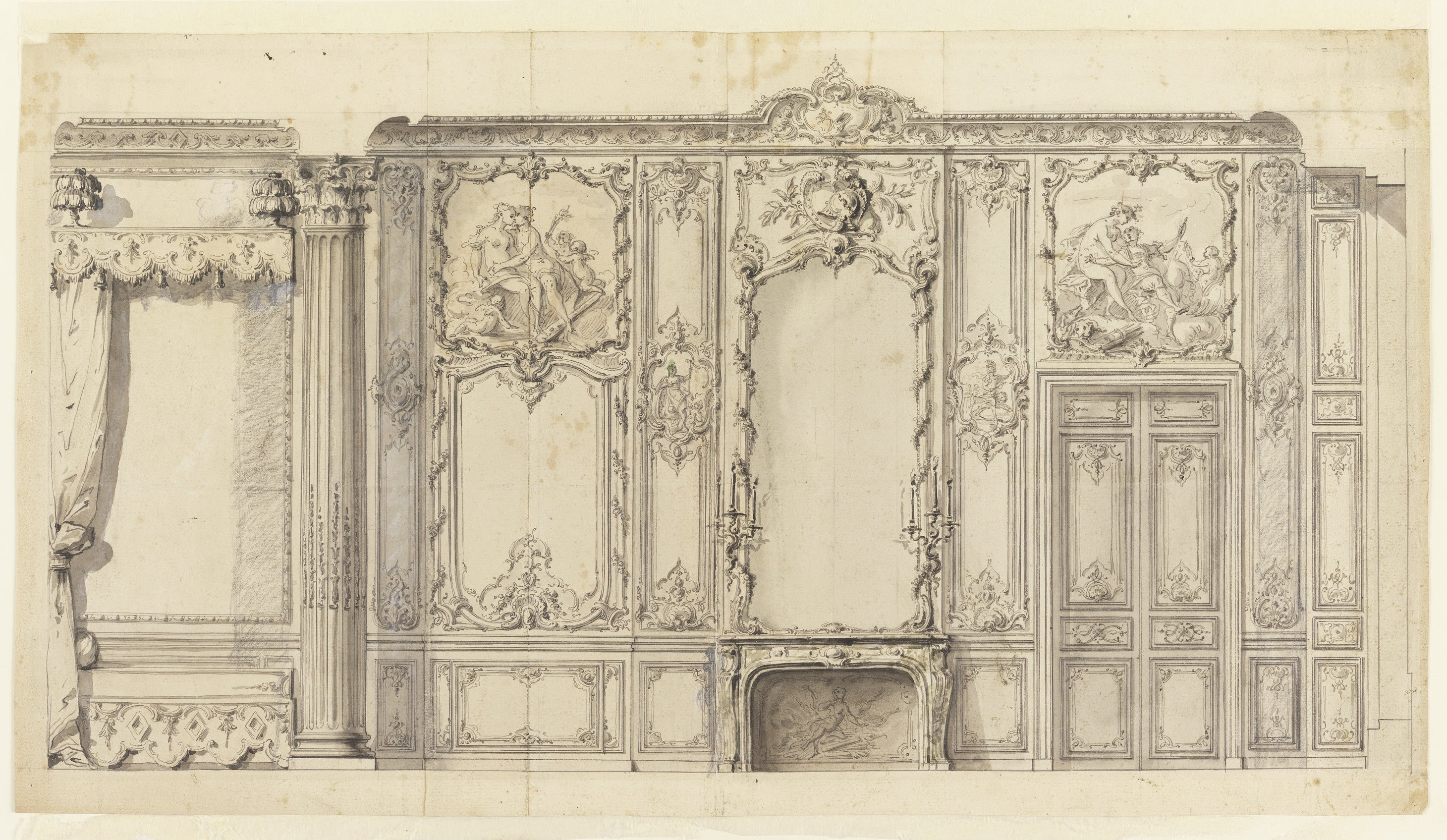
Design for the bedroom of the Prince, Hotel de Soubise, by Germain Boffrand (1735–1740)

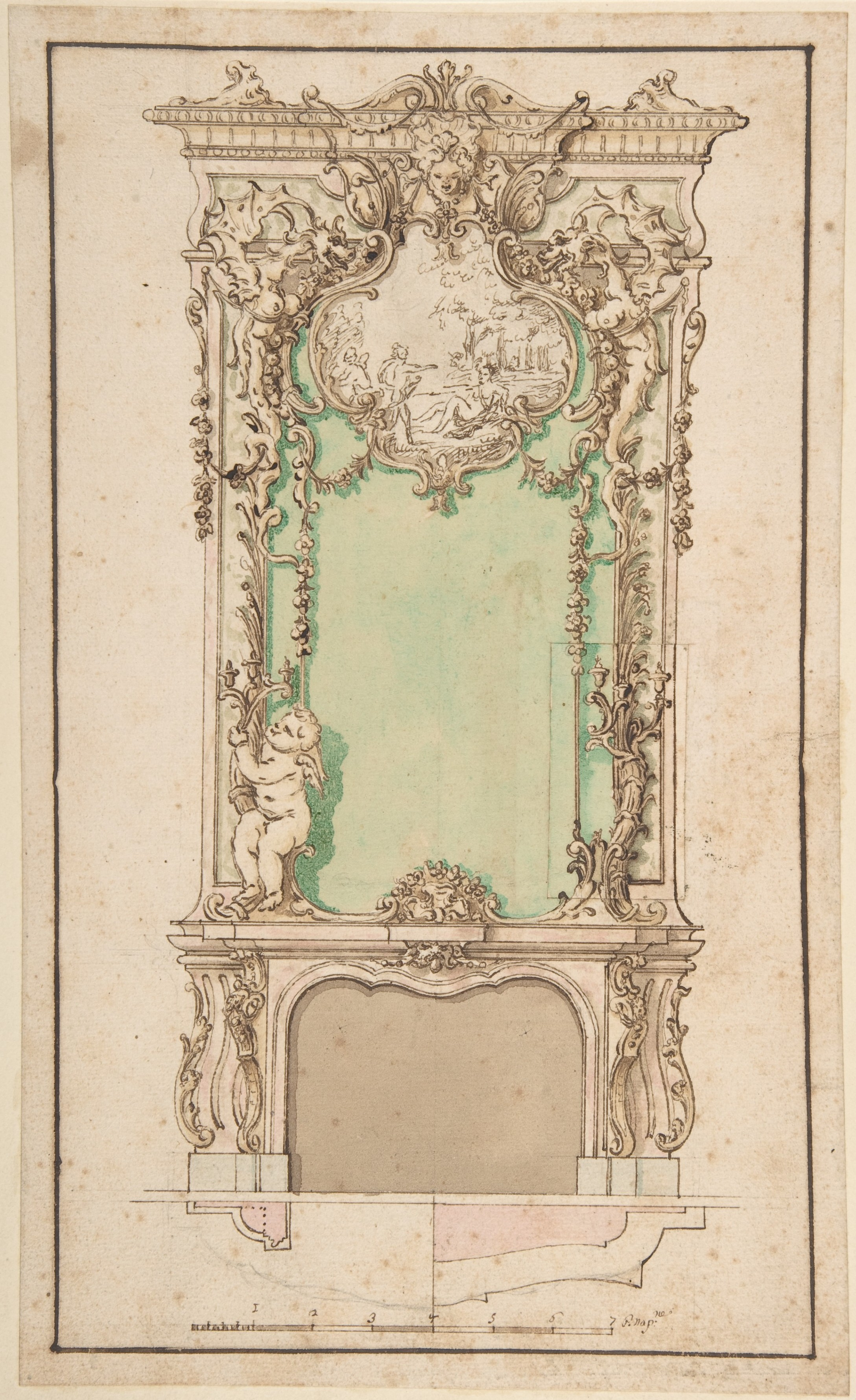
Fireplace and mantle design by Nicolas Pineau (1st half of 18th century)

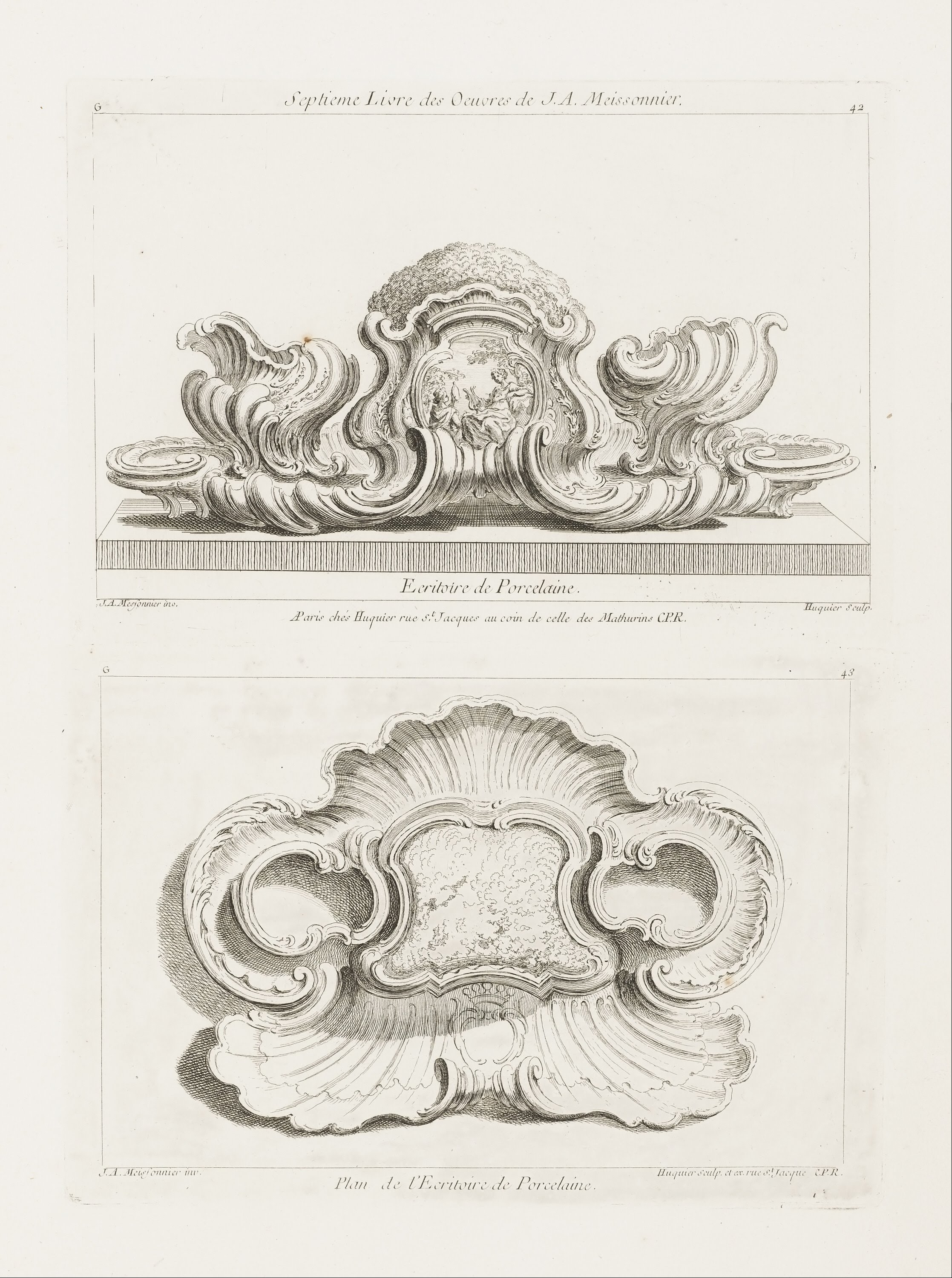
Designs for a porcelain writing set by Juste-Aurèle Meissonnier (1748)

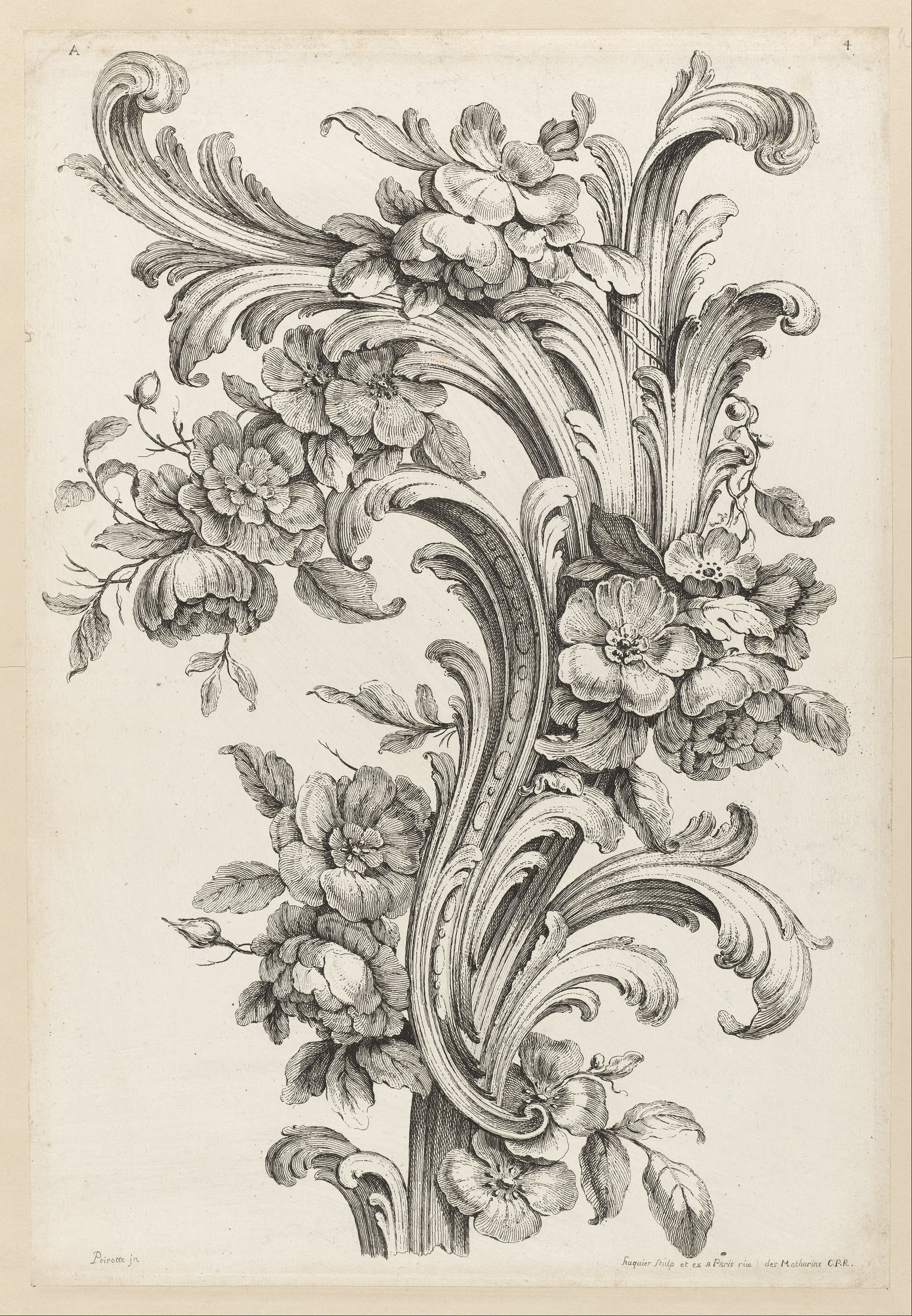
Floral and acanthus leaf design by Alexis Peyrotte (1750)

== Furniture ==
Rocaille decoration was heavily loaded with decoration modeled on seashells, cascades of leaves and flowers, palm leaves, and other natural elements. The decor on walls and furniture was usually made of carved wood or plaster which was gilded. The French designer Bernard Toro produced a book of flamboyant early Rocaille patterns in 1716, which was widely circulated in Europe. The first major craftsman in the style was Juste-Aurèle Meissonnier, followed by Jean Bérain the Elder, Gilles-Marie Oppenordt, Nicolas Pineau, and the sculptor-modelers Thomas Germain, Jacques Caffieri, and the German Jean-Claude Duplessis.

The master cabinet makers or ébénistes of rocaille furniture included Mathieu Criaerd (1689–1776), who became a master in 1738. He was particularly known both for his fine marquetry or inlay, and for his chests with a Chinese or Japanese theme, with fine Chinese lacquer or Martin varnish, and ornaments of gilded and sculpted bronze.

Another important figure of the rocaille style was the ébéniste Charles Cressent (1685–1768), who was a master craftsman both in the guild of wood carvers and bronze ornament sculptors, a rare accomplishment earned respectively in 1708 and 1714. Cressent made furniture not only for Louis XV, but also for the King of Portugal and for the Elector of Bavaria. He is best known for his commodes, book cases and desks, which were often inlaid with rosewood and violet wood and equipped with particularly fine rocaille ornament of gilded bronze, including infants intermingled with birds and cascading vegetation. He introduced several stylistic innovations, including the espagnolettes à aigrette, small busts of young women, applied to the corners of his commodes and desks. This became a common decoration used by other masters of the rocaille.

Other notable furniture craftsmen included the members of the Cresson family, Louis Cresson (1706–1761), Rene Cresson (1705–1749) and Michel Cresson (1709–1781), all of whom provided exceptionally crafted chairs, armoires, commodes and other furnishings for royal residences. Their children also became menuisiers and ébénistes during the reign of Louis XVI.

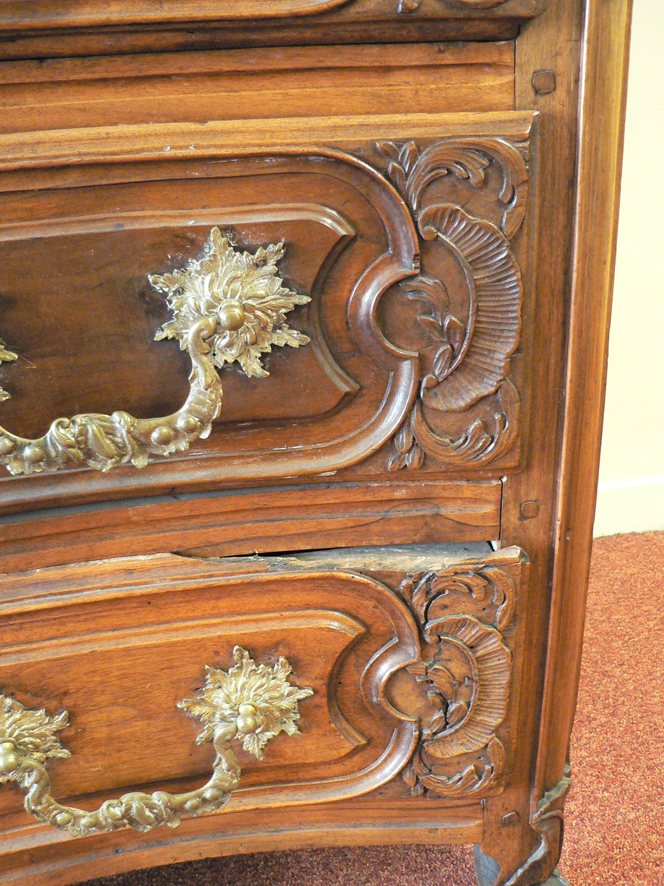
Rocaille ornament of leaves, flowers and seashell

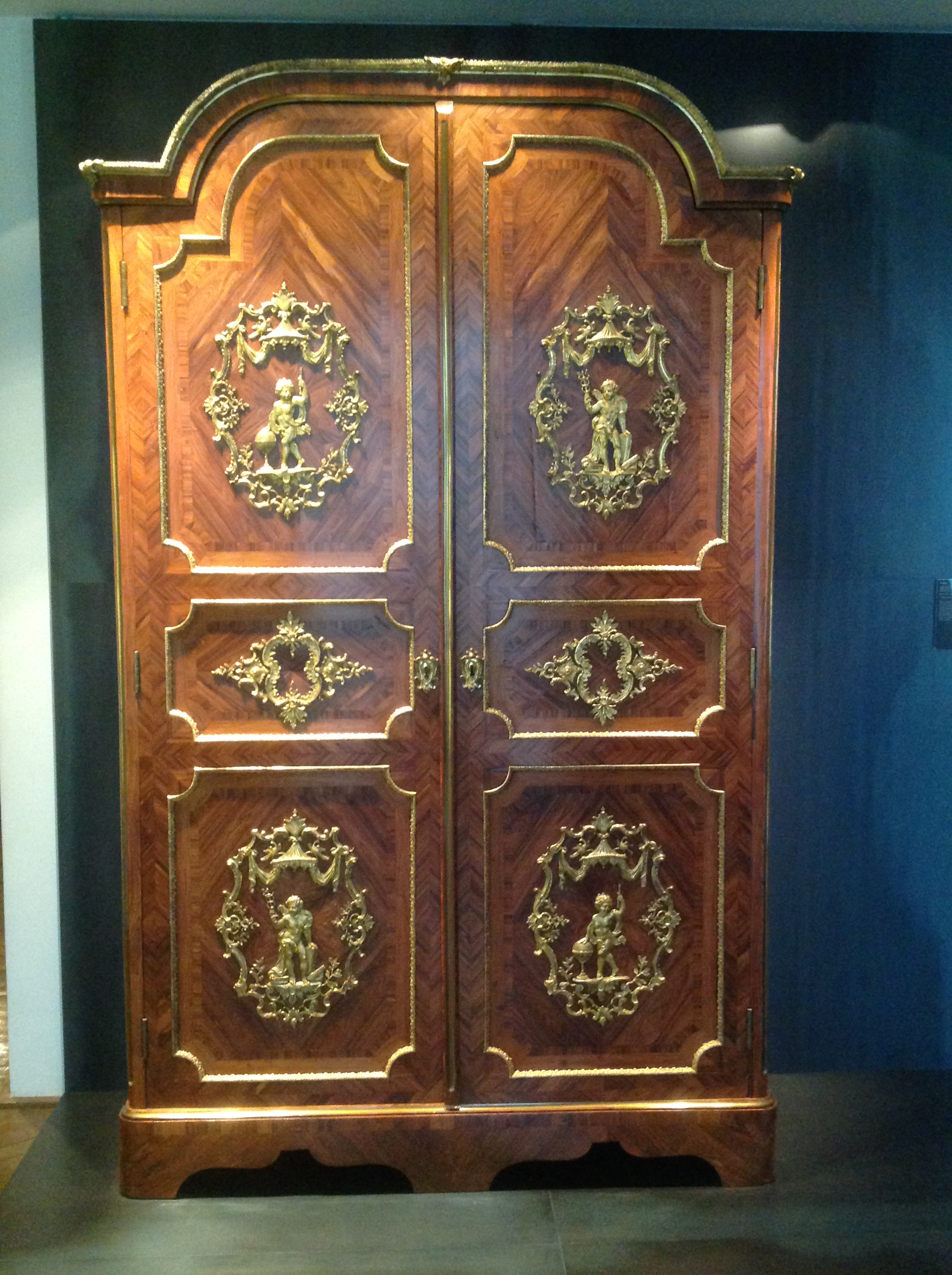
Louis XV Rocaille armoire (1725–1730) by Charles Cressent, (1725–1730)

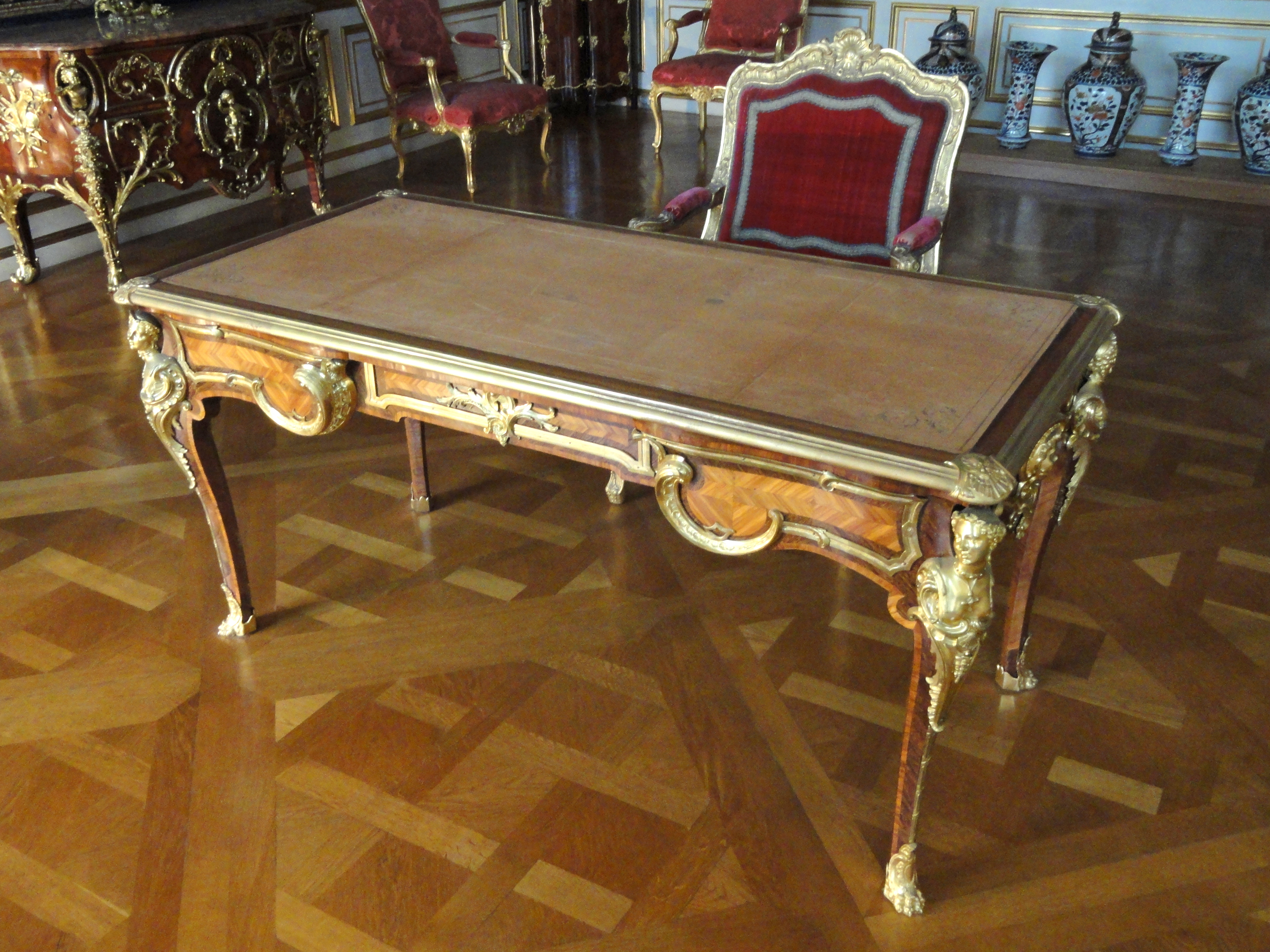
Writing desk with Espagnolettes by Charles Cressent (1730–1735)

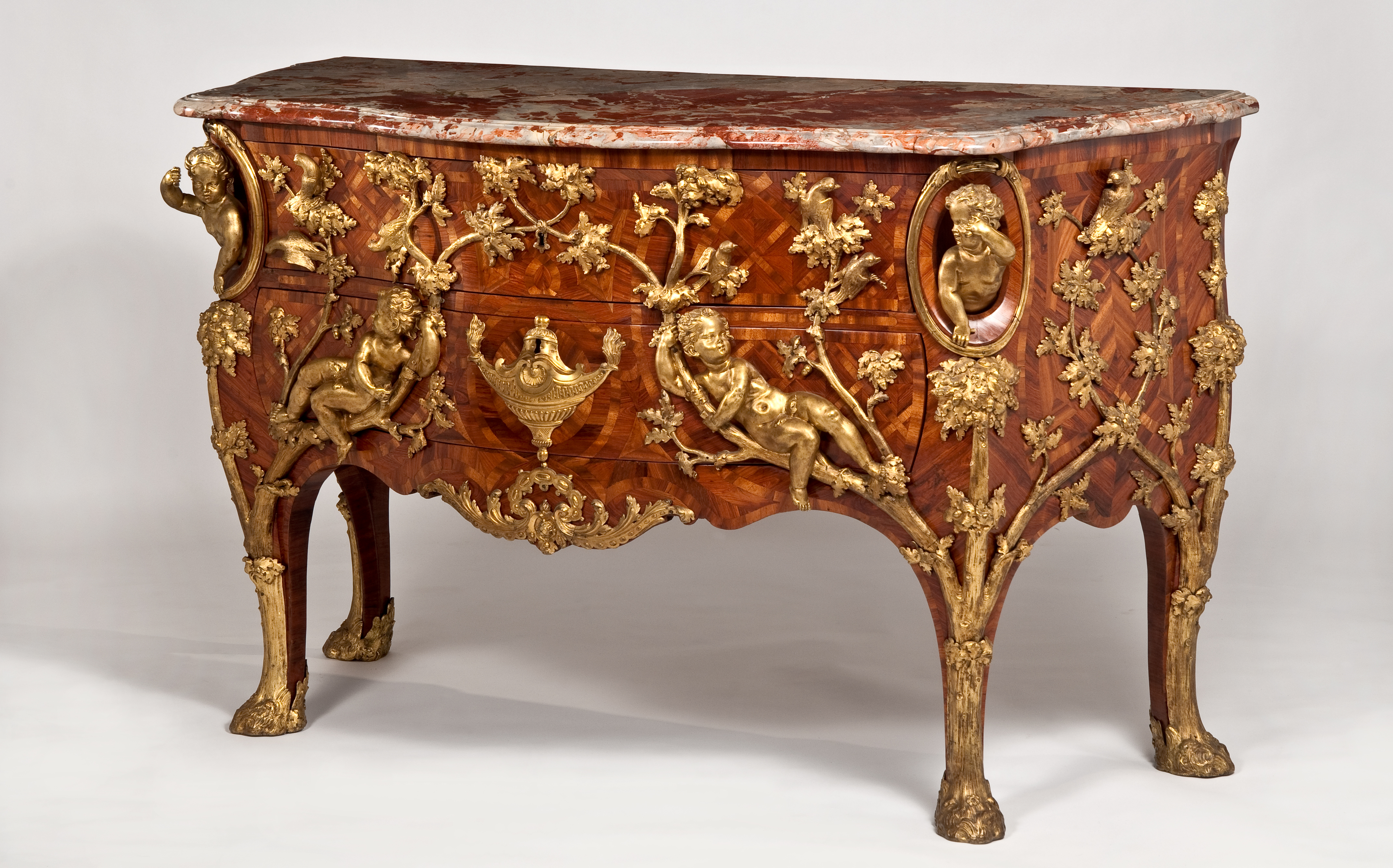
Commode by Charles Cressent (1730), Waddesdon Manor

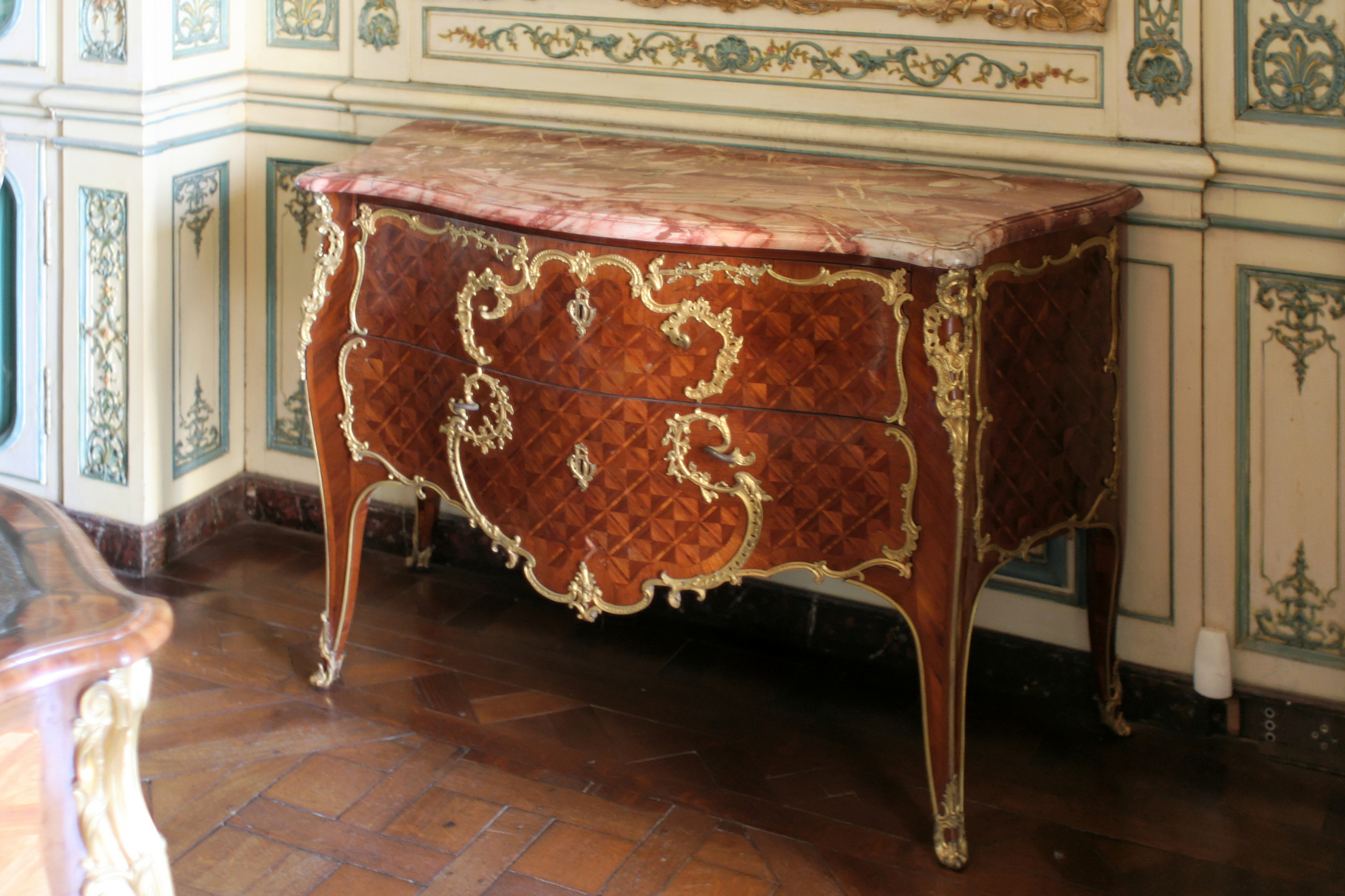
Commode for the Dauphin by Mathieu Criaerd (1748)

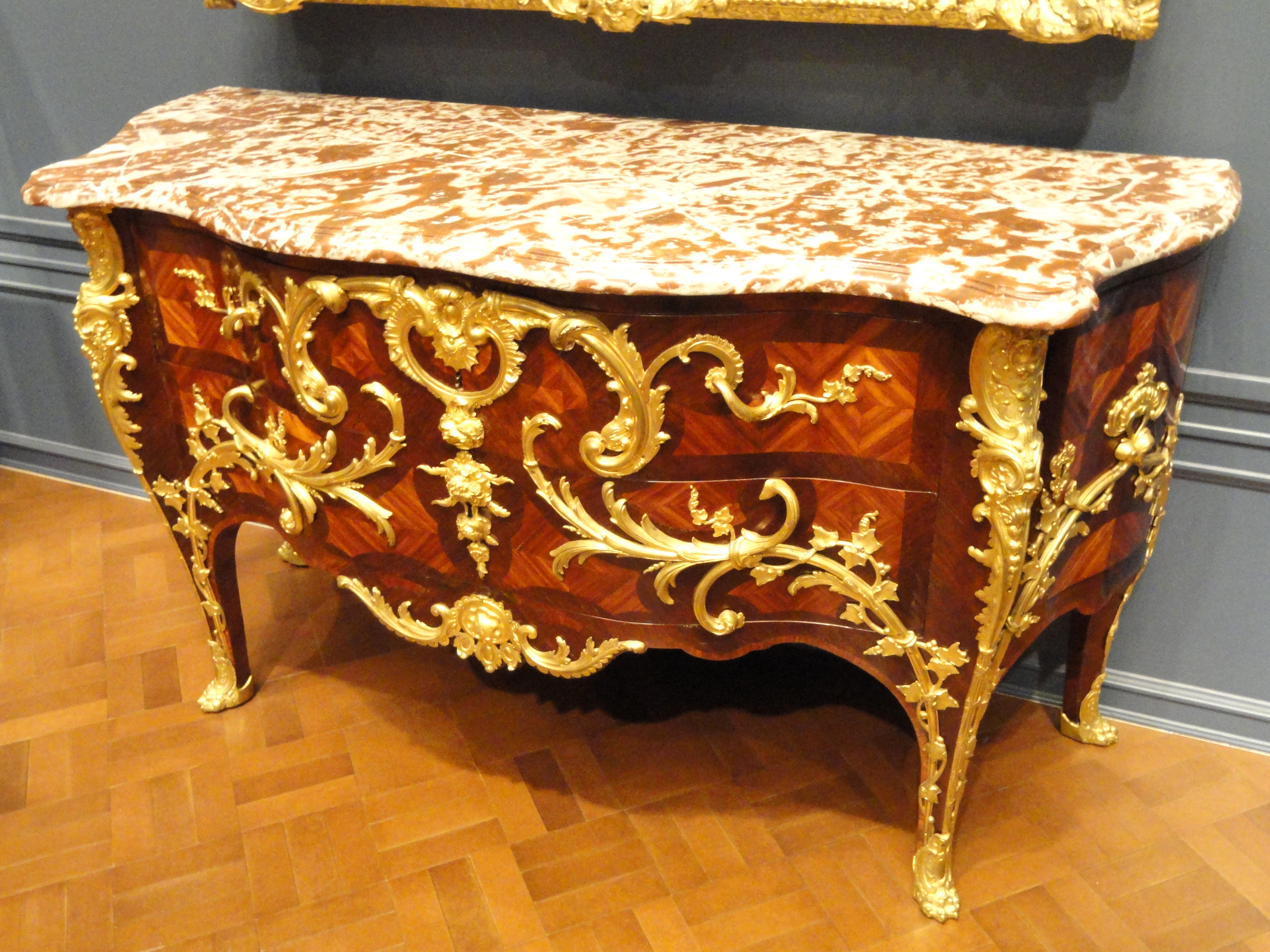
Commode by Charles Cressent (1745–1749), Nelson-Atkins Museum of Art

== Woodwork and interior decoration ==
Rocaille decoration was common in the wooden wall panels and other interior decoration between 1730 and 1750. The trim was usually made of carved and gilded wood or stucco against a white background. The panels in the frames often also had decorative painting, usually of arabesques or colorful floral patterns, and often featured animals or exotic subjects, set in China, Japan, or Turkey.

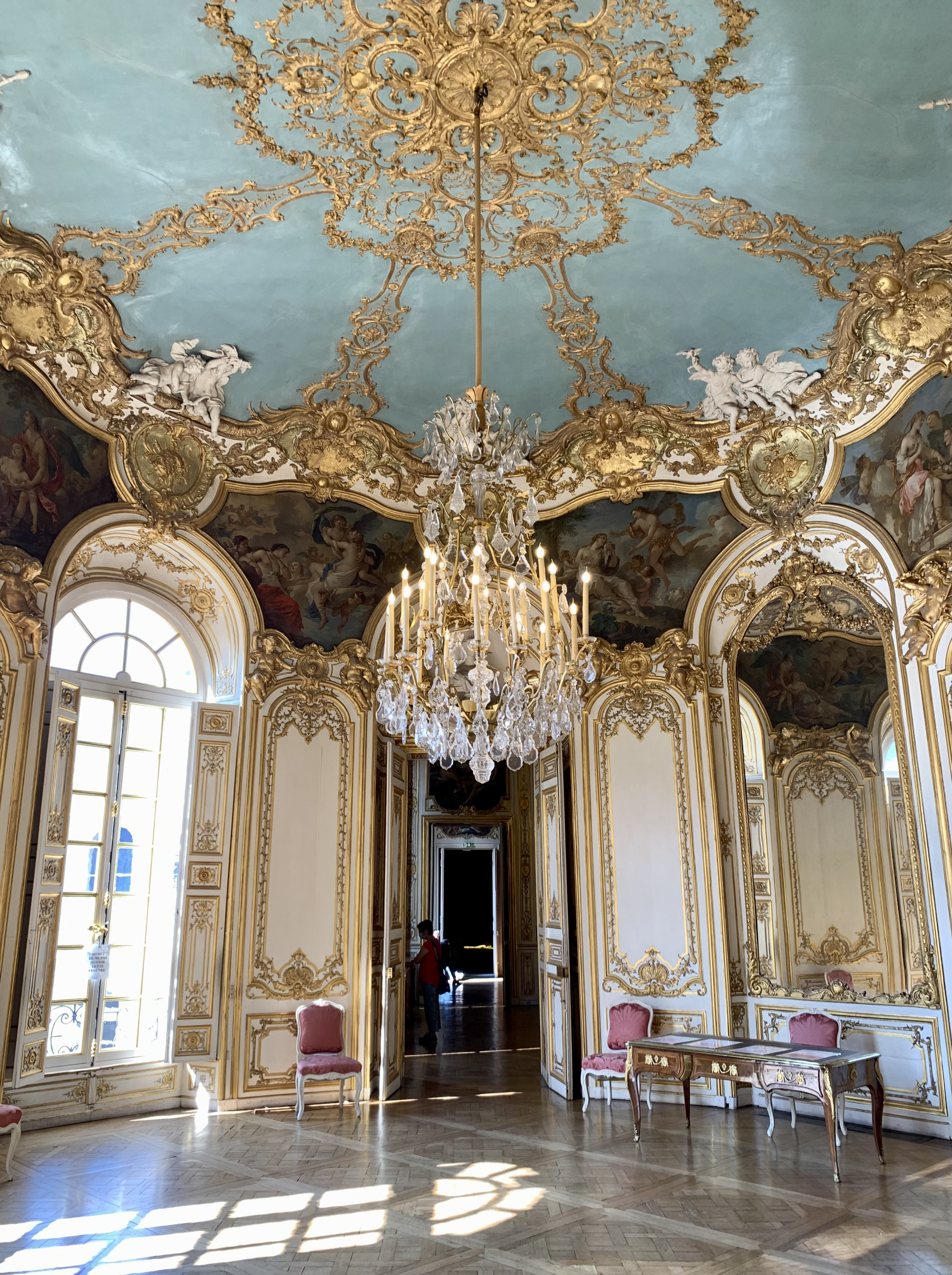
Salon of the Hôtel de Soubise in Paris (1735–1740)

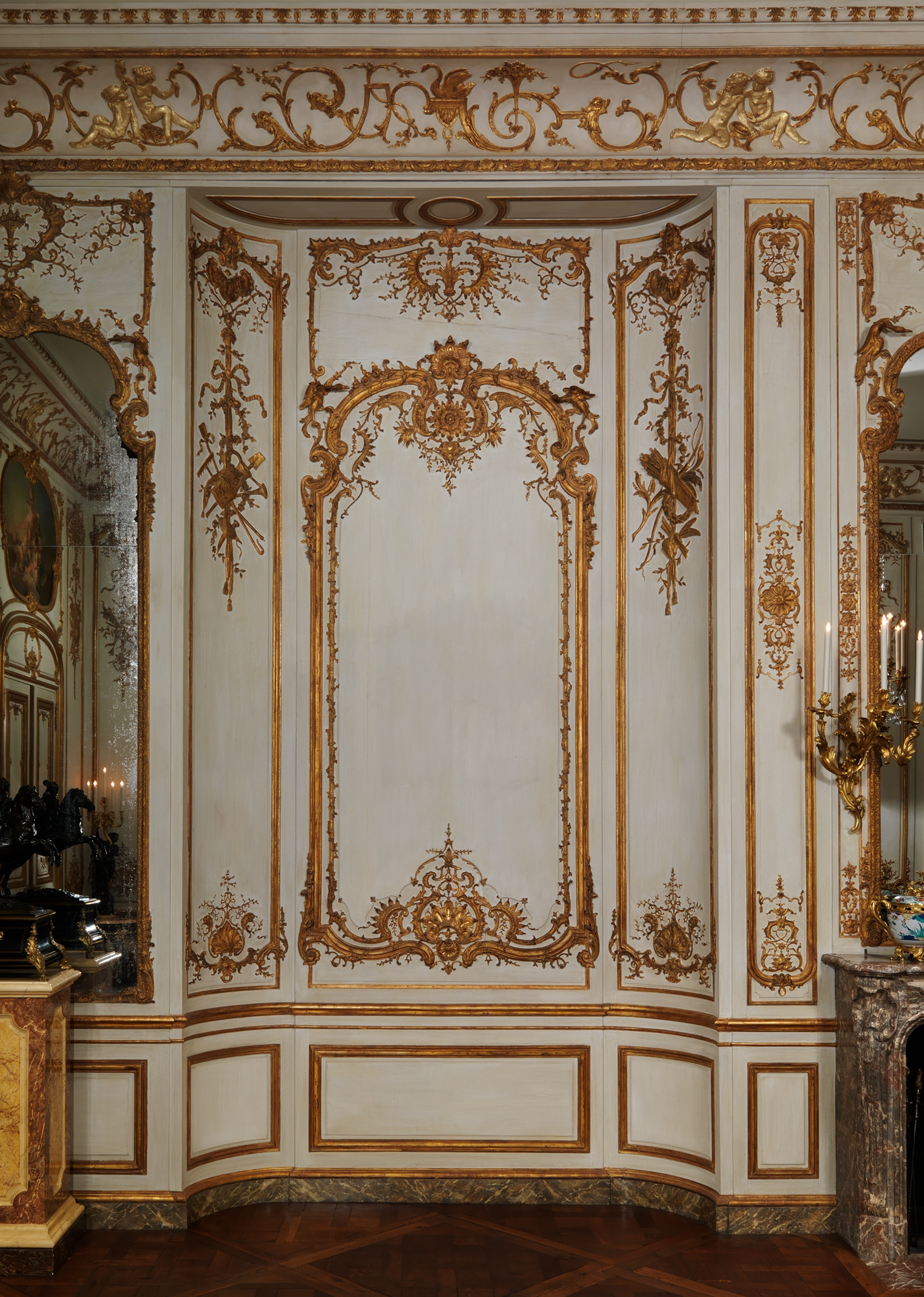
Woodwork in the Hôtel de Varengeville by Nicolas Pineau (1735)

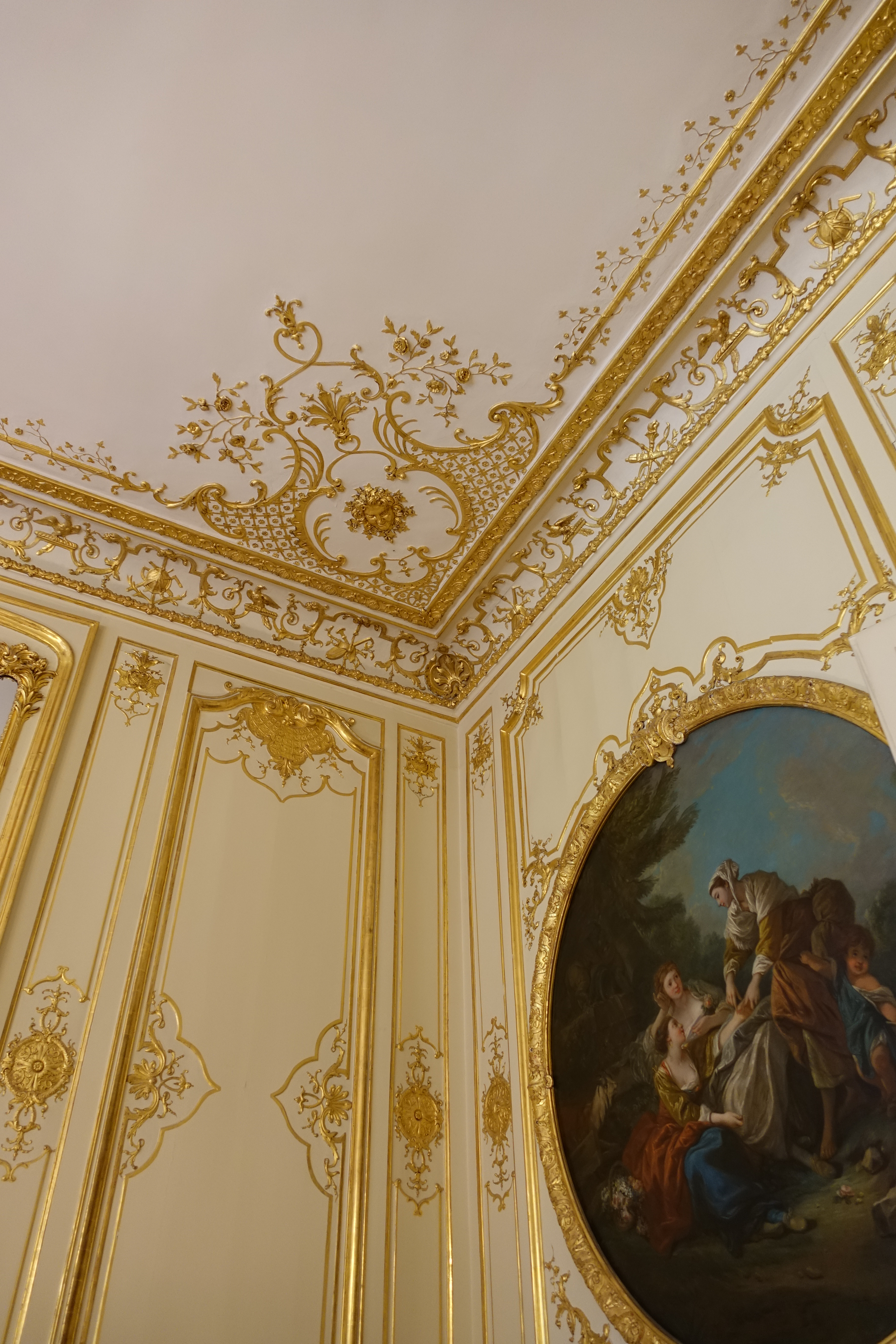
Decoration on ceiling of office of the French Prime Minister, Hôtel Matignon (1720–1725)

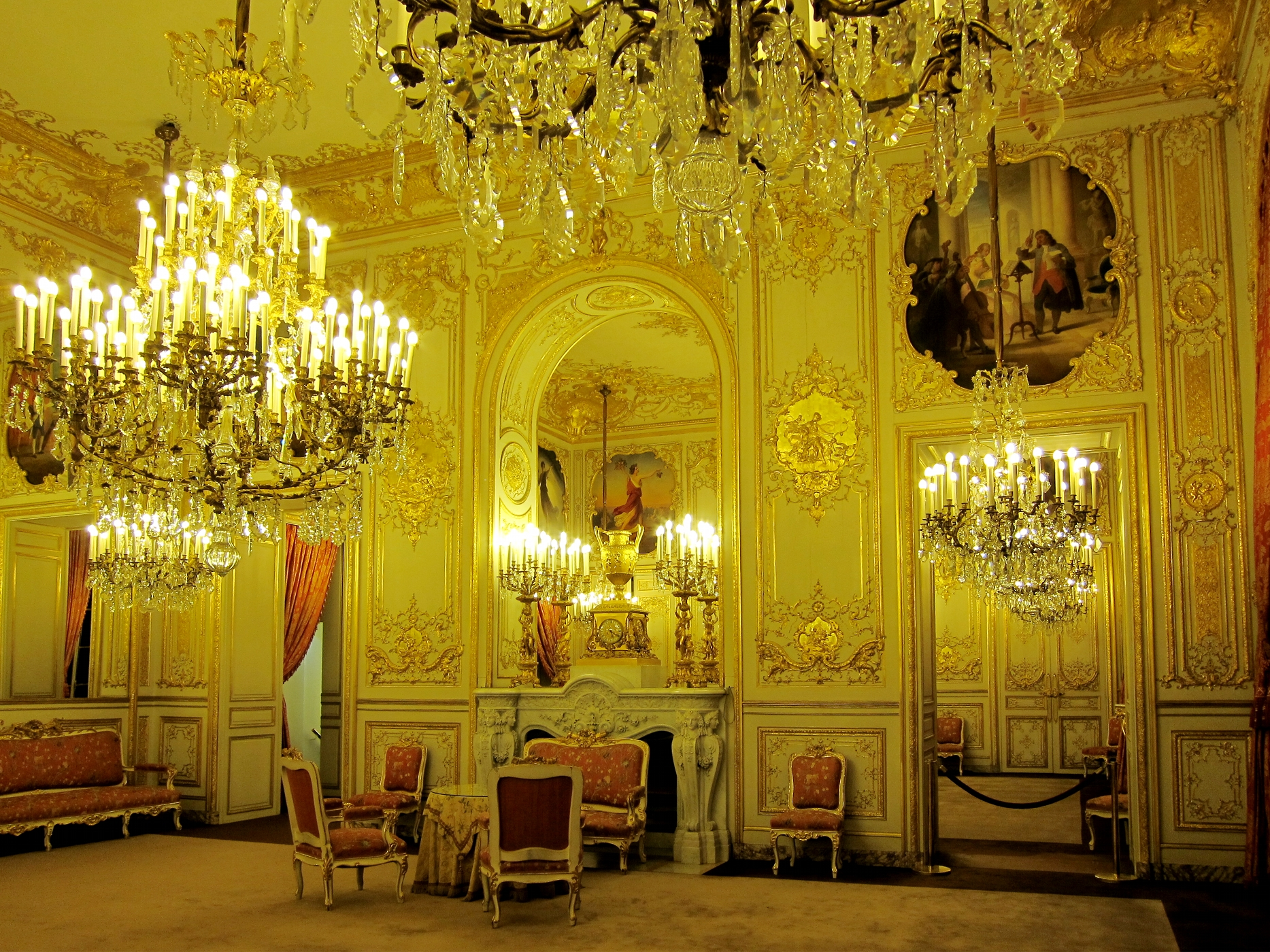
Salon of the Hôtel de Lassay, now residence of President of the National Assembly

== Silver, porcelain and metalwork ==
Besides its use in furniture, the style appeared in porcelain and metalwork. In 1738, the Manufacture de Vincennes was founded thanks to the support of Louis XV and Madame de Pompadour, in order to compete with the manufactories at Chantilly and Meissen. In 1756, the manufactury was moved to a building in Sèvres, built at the initiative of Madame de Pompadour, near her château.

The most remarkable rocaille metal work included the cast iron and gilded fences and gates created by iron maker Jean Lamour for the new Place Stanislas in Nancy between 1750 and 1758 as the Duchy of Lorraine was attached to France. The square was completed with an ensemble of buildings whose balconies and suspended lamps matched the grillwork of the fence and gates.

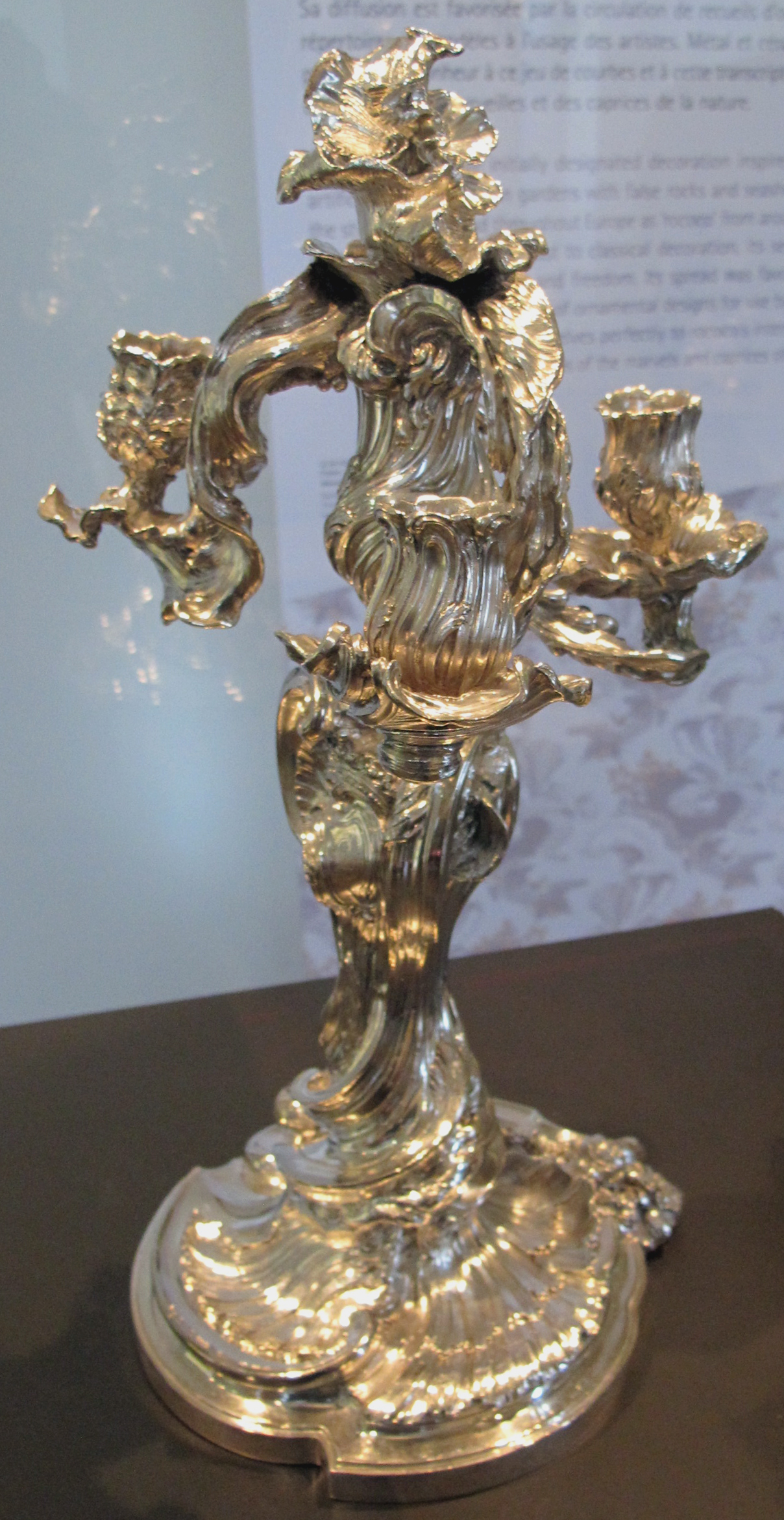
Silver candelabra by Juste-Aurèle Meissonnier (1734–1735)

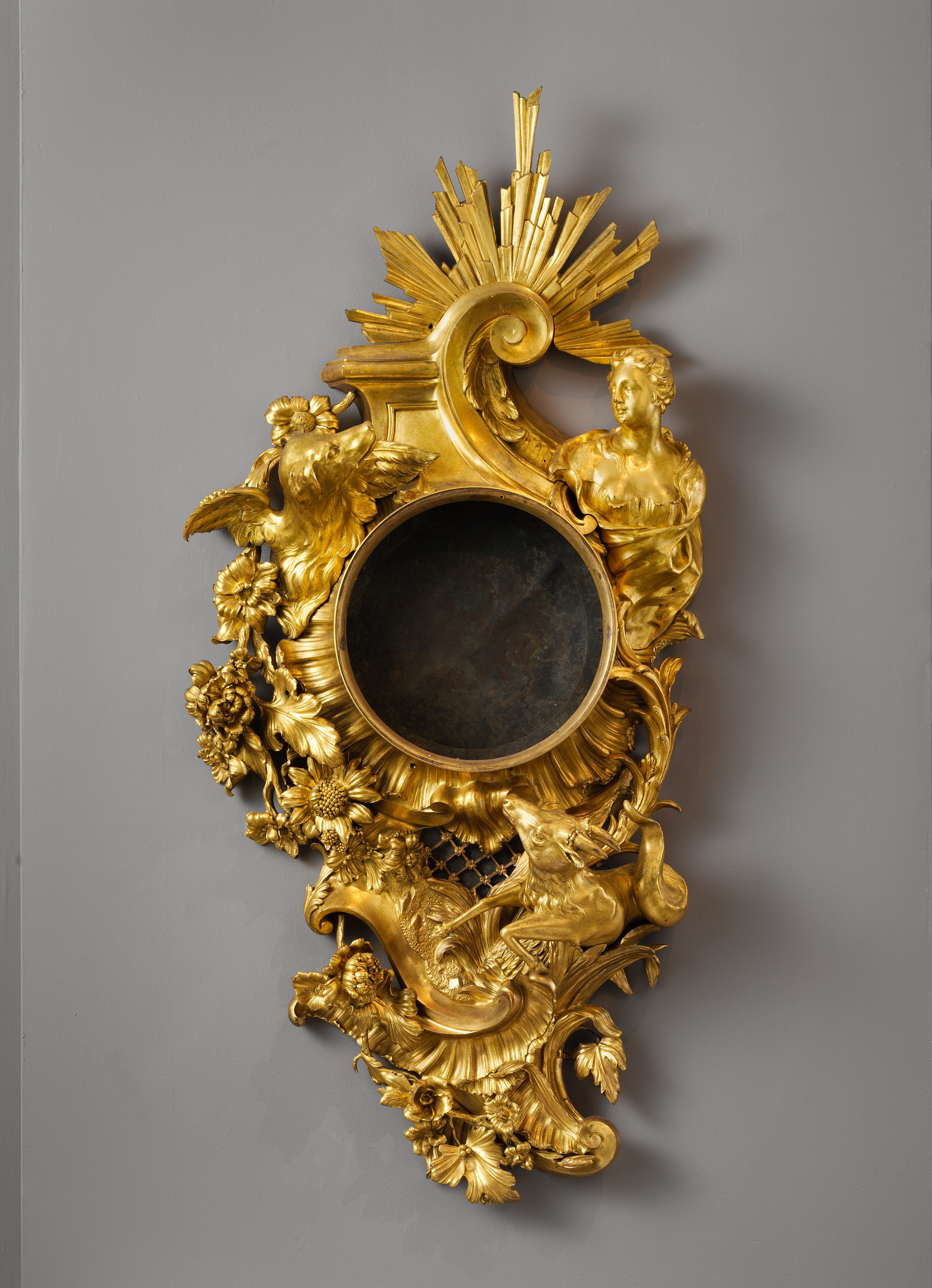
Frame for a wall clock by Jacques Caffieri (1745–1750)

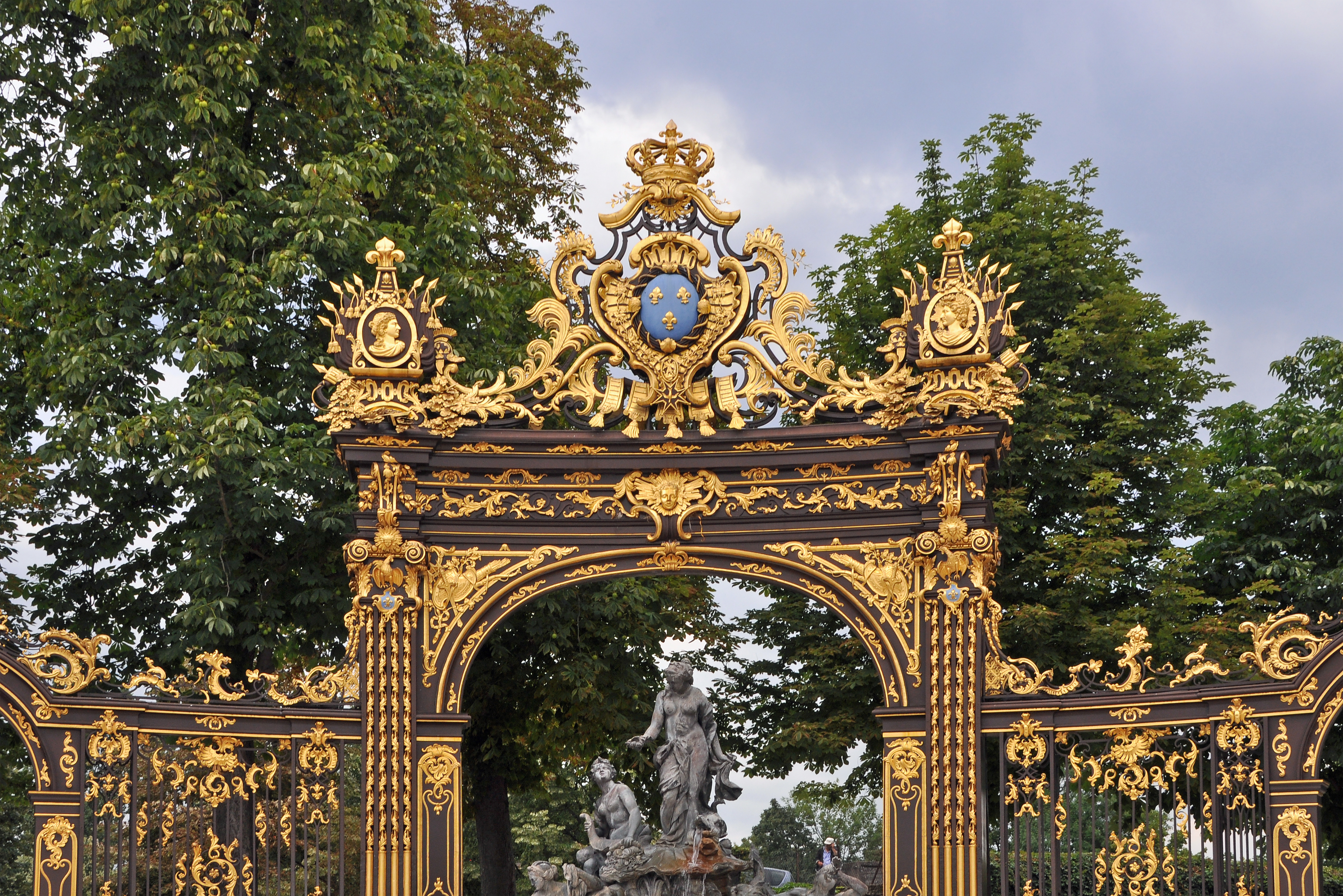
Gilded cast-iron fence of Place Stanislas in Nancy (France) by Jean Lamour (1750–1758)

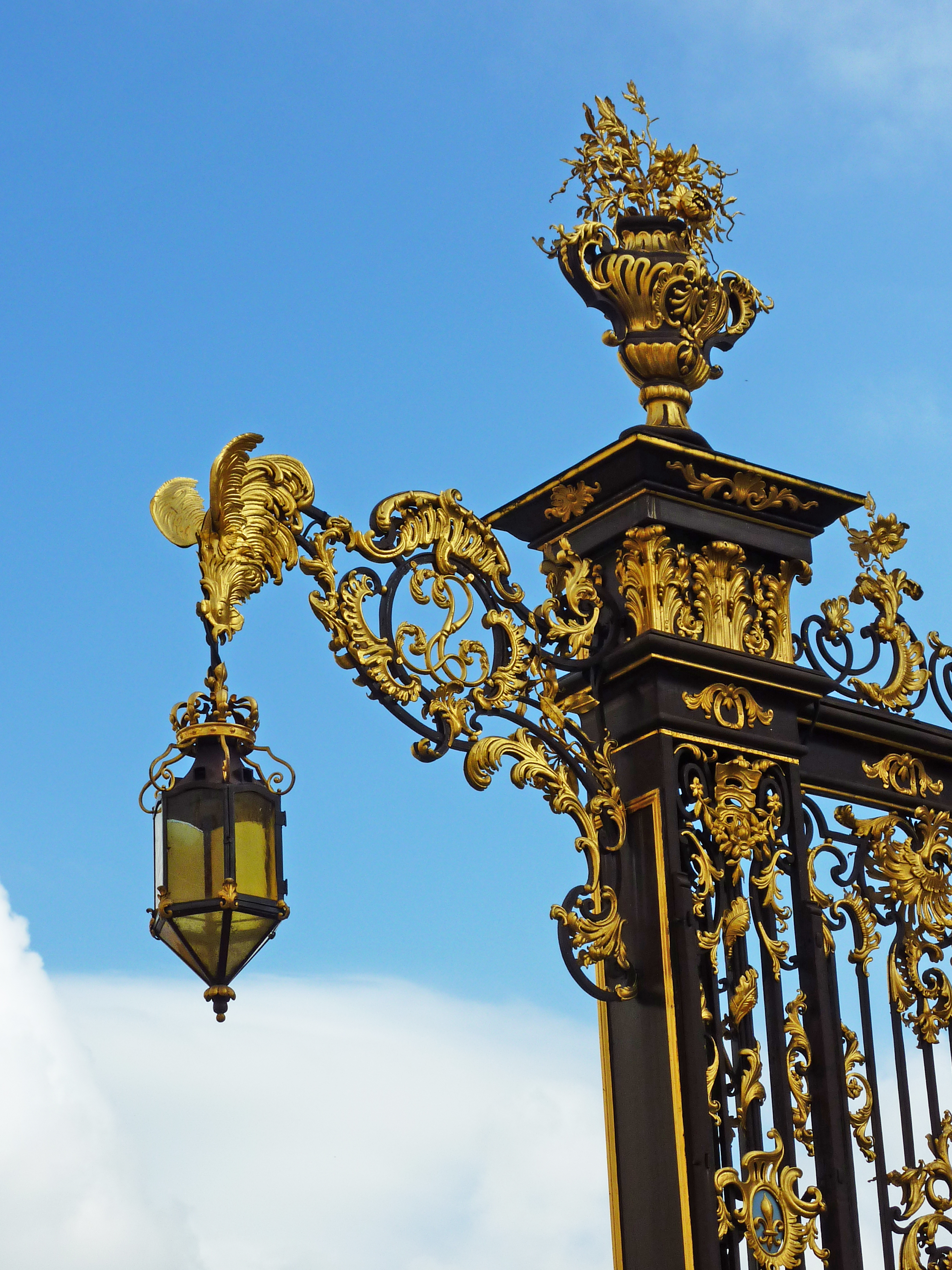
Gilded cast-iron lamp post of Place Stanislas in Nancy, France by Jean Lamour (1750–1758)

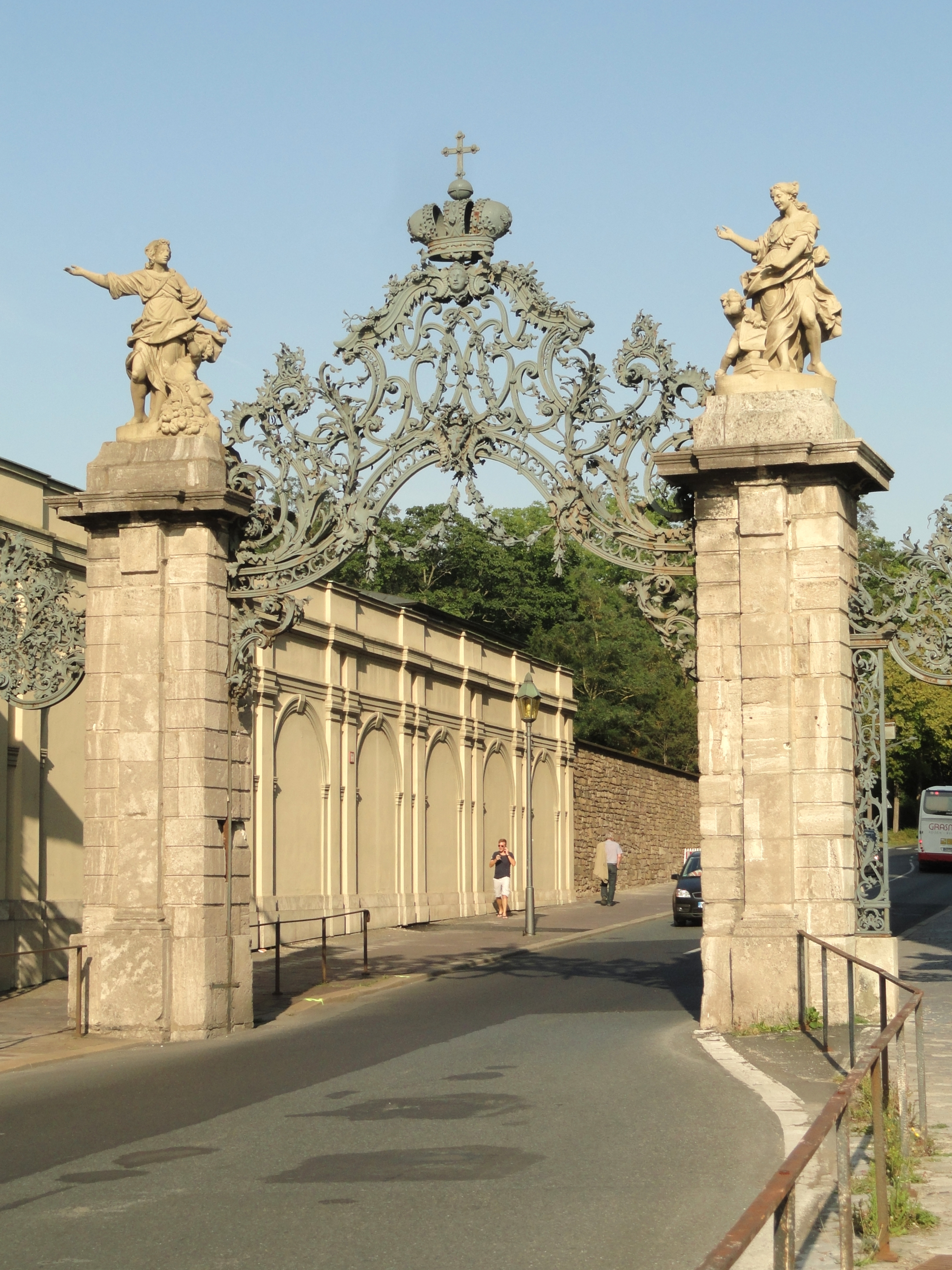
Gate with two statues and elaborate wrought-iron grilles, in Würzburg (Germany), grilles by Johann Georg Oegg (1752)

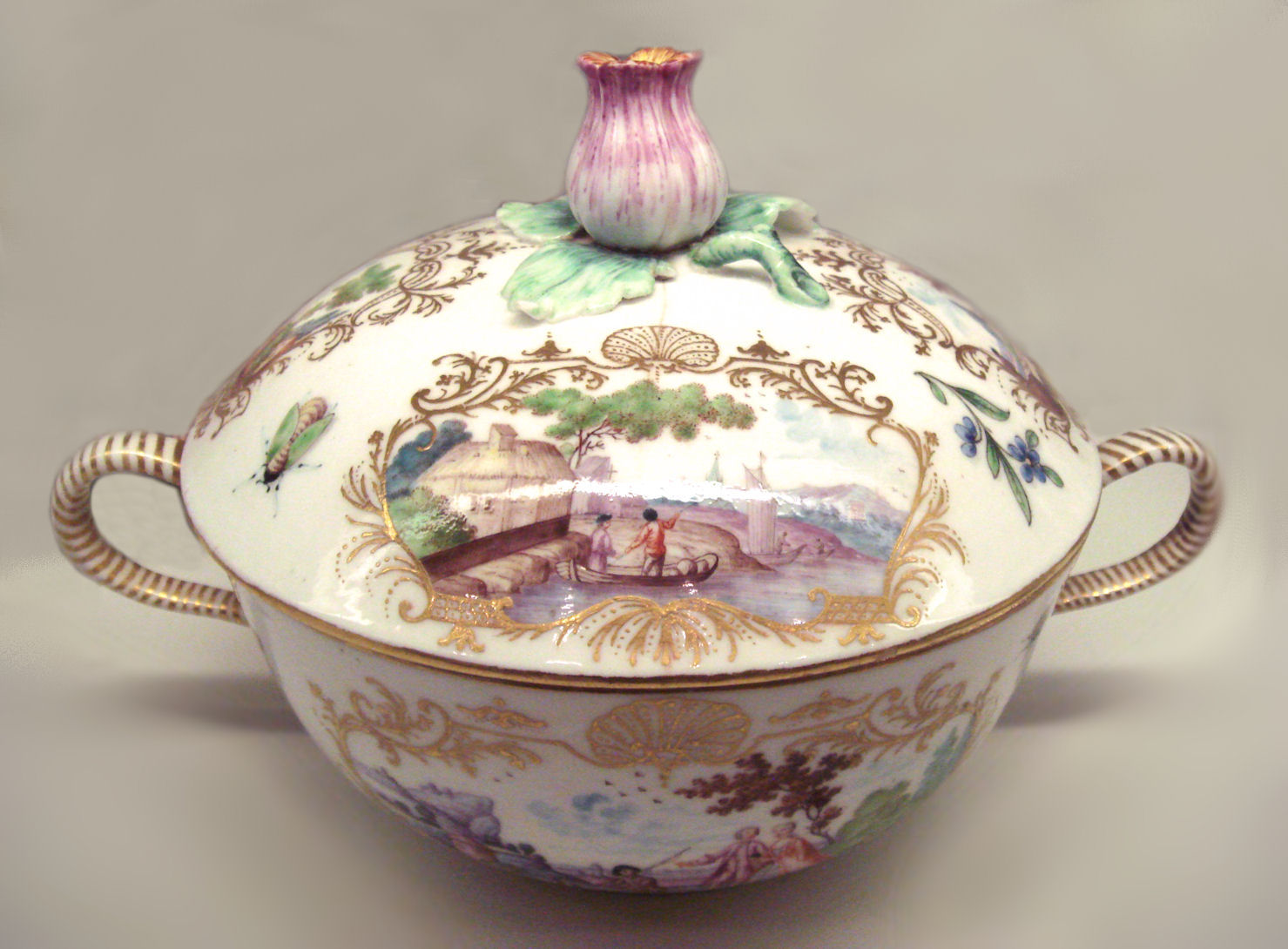
Vincennes soft porcelain with rocaille design and a Chinese scene (1749–1750)

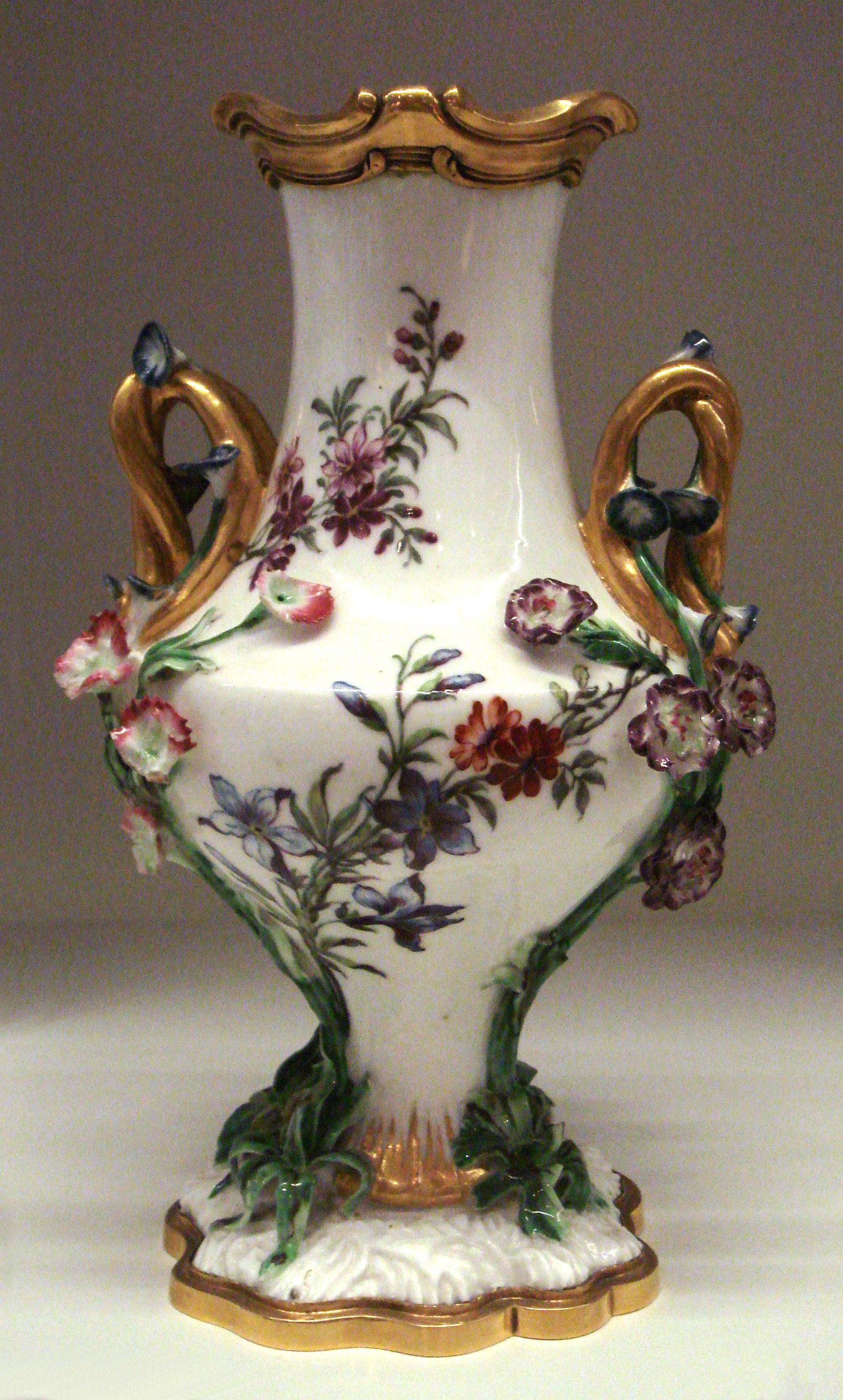
Vase of Vincennes porcelain by Jean-Claude Duplessis (1753)

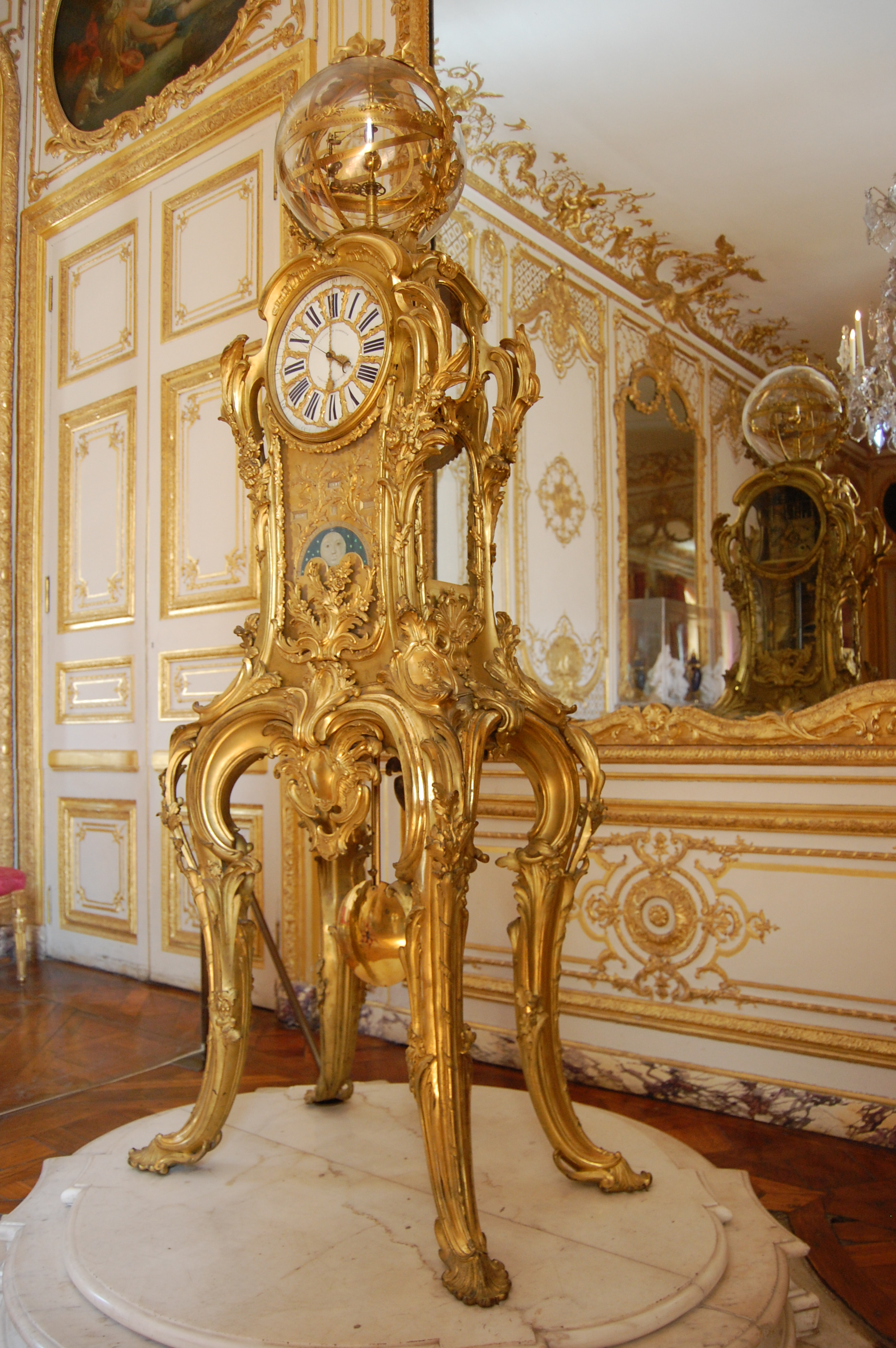
Astronomical clock of gilded bronze by Jacques Caffieri (1754), Museum of Versailles

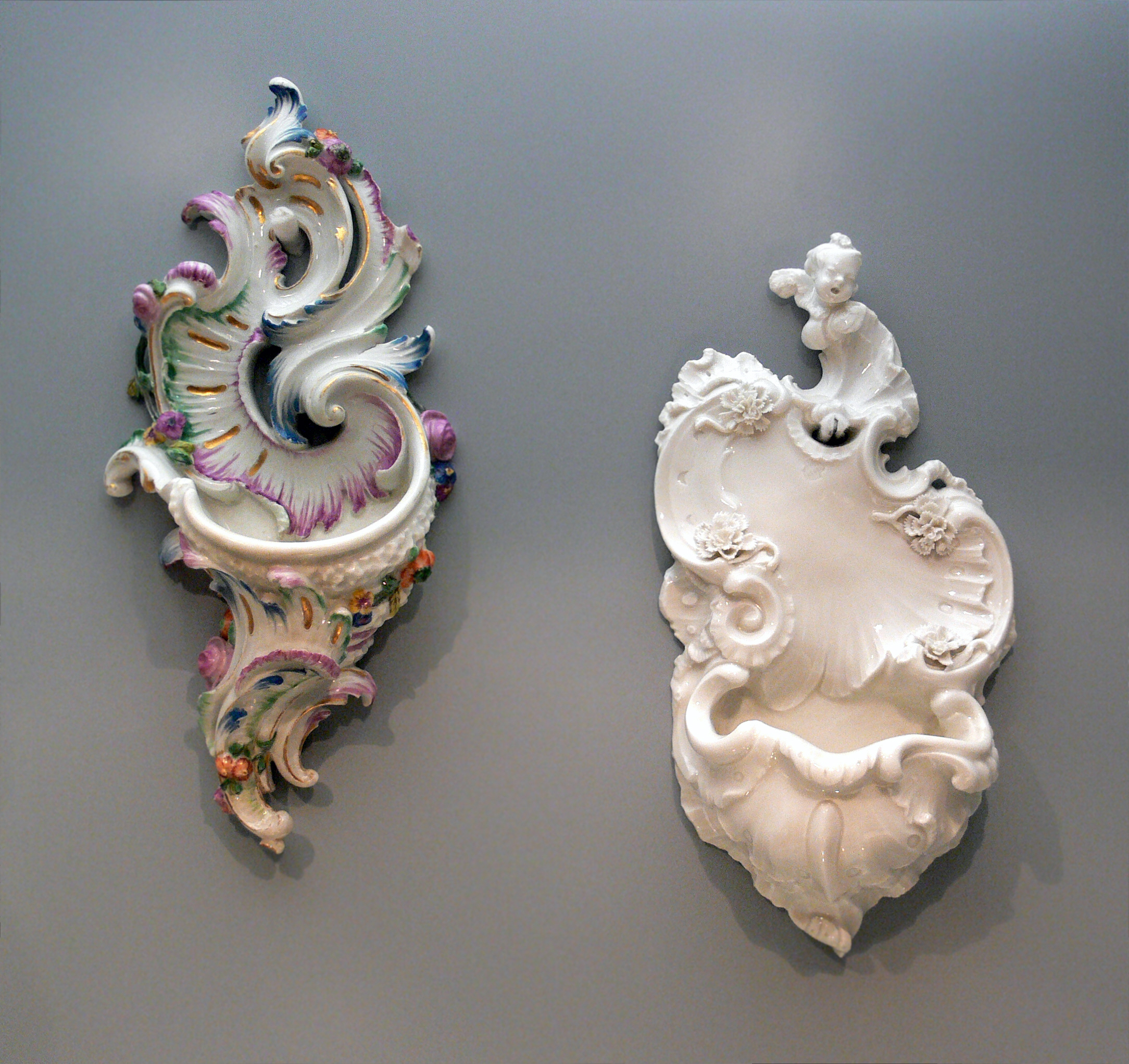
Two Nymphenburg porcelain holy water fonts, model probably by Franz Anton Bustelli (around 1760)

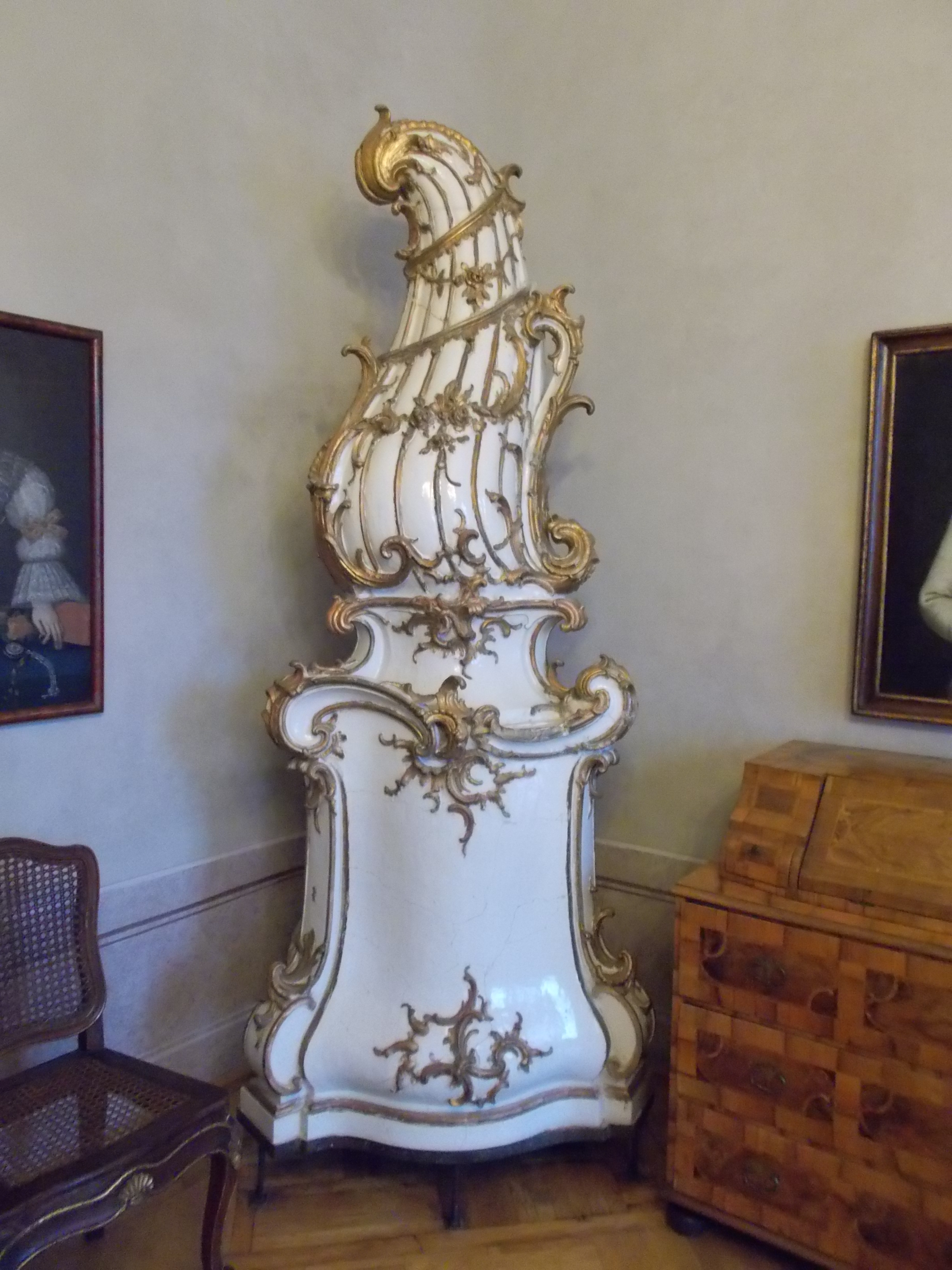
Hungarian tiled faience stove, in the Baroque Rudnyánszky mansion from Budapest (18th century)

== Influence and decline ==
The Rocaille influenced the Chippendale style in England, and the work of the Belgian-born Bavarian decorative artist François de Cuvilliés. The style also became very popular for a time in Italy, particularly in Venice, and spread to Austria, Bavaria and Spain, where it took on a more exuberant and overcharged form.

The discovery of Greek antiquities beginning in 1738 at Herculanum and especially at Pompeii in 1748 turned French architecture in the direction of the more symmetrical and less flamboyant neo-classicism and the Louis XV style. Furniture and decoration became more geometric; furniture legs became straight, resembling Roman or Grecian columns, and the ornate carving on the exterior of furniture was increasingly replaced by fine inlays of multicolored wood.

== See also ==
- Liège–Aachen Baroque furniture
- Baroque in Prince-Bishopric of Liège

== Bibliography ==
- De Morant, Henry (1970). Histoire des arts décoratifs (in French). Librarie Hachette.
- Ducher, Robert (1988). Caractéristique des Styles (in French). Paris, France: Flammarion. ISBN 2-08-011539-1.
- Renault, Christophe (2006). Les Styles de l'architecture et du mobilier (in French). Paris, France: Gisserot. ISBN 978-2-877-4746-58.
- Wiegant, Claude-Paul (1995). Le Mobilier Français- Transition Louis XVI (in French). Paris, France: Massin. ISBN 2-7072-0281-9.
- Lovreglio, Aurélia and Anne (2006). Dictionnaire des Mobiliers et des Objets d'art du Moyen Âge au XXIe siècle (in French). Paris, France: Le Robert. ISBN 2-84902-079-6.
