= Nicolas Pineau =

French carver

Nicolas Pineau (1684–1754) was a French carver and ornamental designer, one of the leaders who initiated the exuberant style of the French rocaille or Rococo. He worked in St. Petersburg and Paris.

Pineau, the son of the carver Jean-Baptiste Pineau (died 1694), who appears in the Bâtiments du Roi accounts for Versailles and elsewhere from 1680, was the outstanding talent among those designers and craftsmen who accompanied Alexandre Le Blond to St. Petersburg in 1716. His Russian contracts were for designing and carving "doors, chimney pieces, frames, table frames and other ornaments and designs". Le Blond's premature death in 1719 left Pineau the leading French decorative artist in Russia, called upon for a variety of decorations and even to give architectural designs. His chief work in Russia is the design and carving of the Grand Cabinet of Peter the Great in Peterhof, which the Tsar showed, newly complete, in August 1721. Unlike many works by French artists abroad, its distribution is entirely French, featuring central opposed mirrors over low chimneypieces, flanked by carved panels and double doors. The richly carved panels in varying relief with bold central cartouches and military trophies follow surviving drawings by Pineau.

His contract expired in 1726, though he lingered to the beginning of the Russian New Year the following March. On his return to Paris, Pineau found the Régence manner had been transformed in the decade of his absence by the carver-designer François-Antoine Vassé and the designer Gilles-Marie Oppenord (see Rococo). Surprised to find the field of architecture currently well filled by highly competent Paris-trained practitioners, Jacques-François Blondel reported, he depended upon his own specialty of designs for carving, and enjoyed a vogue extraordinaire. He associated himself particularly with the architect Jean-Baptiste Leroux, who afforded him free rein in designing interiors. The later reaction against the Rococo ensured that most of these crucial works were destroyed through neglect: Pineau's work is amply documented, however, in his surviving drawings and in engravings, witnesses to his delicacy of relief, the extreme attenuation of his mouldings and the free interplay of tendril and interlace (Kimball, p. 163). Individually asymmetrical panels exhibit the Rococo concept of contraste, finding their balance in corresponding features on the other side of a central panel or mirror frame. Pierced rims of expanded shellwork are combined with naturalistic sprays of flowers. At the top of the walls, the upper molding of the cove that joins walls to ceiling no longer follows the outlines of the room but sweeps boldly to join together the cartouches that spring from the corners.

Pineau's designs were well represented in engravings, which disseminated Parisian styles across Europe. "It was Pineau who was primarily responsible for the creation and the adoption of the genre pittoresque in French interiors. Earlier than Meissonnier, he designed and executed rooms fully incorporating the crucial innovations. Far more than Meissonnier or any other, he fixed the character and type of detail destined to prevail in France. Among all the works, his own were to remain unsurpassed."

== Pineau's boiseries in Parisian hôtels ==
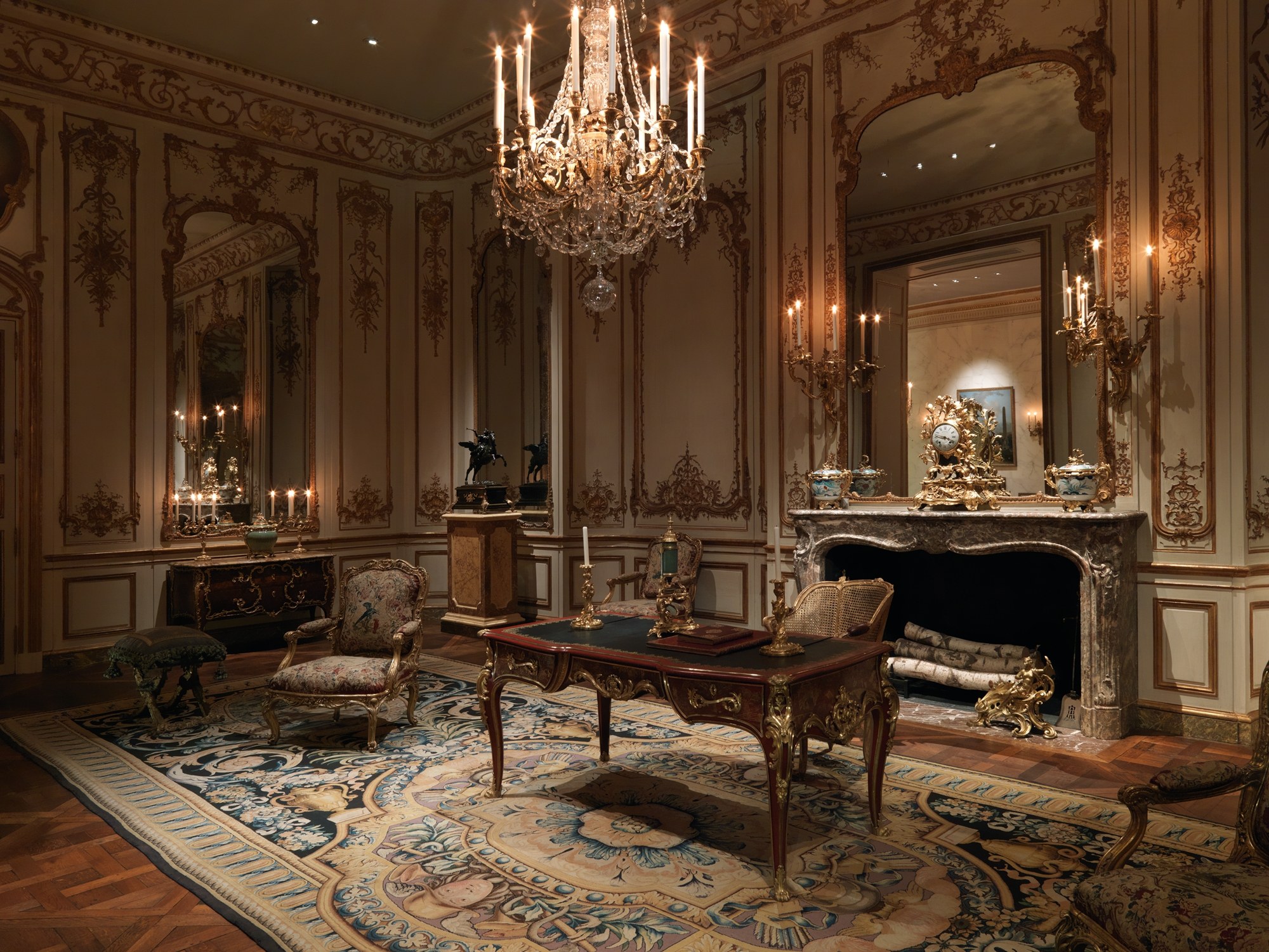
Boiserie from the Hôtel de Varengeville, attributed to Pineau on the basis on similar drawings, now in the Metropolitan Museum of Art, New York

- Hôtel de Matignon, about 1732. Surviving. Fiske Kimball attributed the undocumented boiseries, ceiling stuccowork and mirrors To Pineau.
- Hôtel de Rouillé (on the rue des Poulies), about 1732. Architecture remodelled by Jean-François Blondel. The first documented work of Pineau in Paris, represented in numerous drawings in the Musée des Arts Décoratifs, Paris. The building was demolished after 1760, to clear the area in front of the Louvre Colonnade.
- Hôtel de Villars, the Gallery in the east wing, 1732–33. Architecture by Leroux. Documented in a suite of nine engraved plates by Jacques-François Blondel.
- Hôtel de Roquelaure, 1733. Survives.
- Hôtel de Mazarin, rue de Varenne, 1735. Architecture by Leroux. Interior remodelling.
- Hôtel de Varengeville, about 1735. Attributed to Pineau on the basis on similar drawings. A boiserie is installed at the Metropolitan Museum.
