= Charles Cressent =

French sculptor

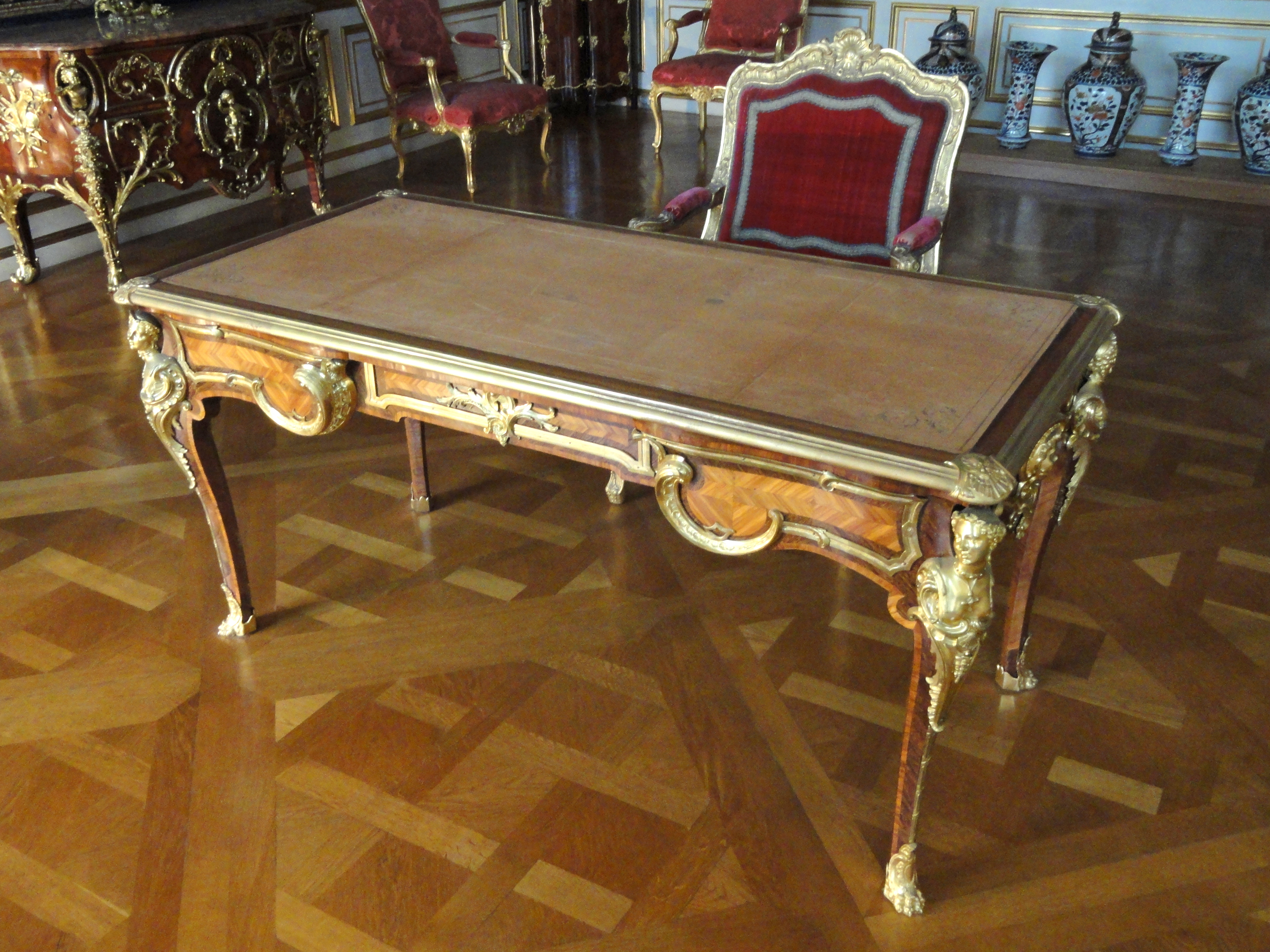
Writing desk by Charles Cressent, 1730–1735

Charles Cressent (1685–1768) was a French furniture-maker, sculptor and fondeur-ciseleur of the régence style. As the second son of François Cressent, sculpteur du roi, and grandson of Charles Cressent, a furniture-maker of Amiens, who also became a sculptor, he inherited tastes, skills and aptitudes which contributed to his success as an artist. Even more important, perhaps, was the fact that he was a pupil of André Charles Boulle. Cressent's distinction is closely connected with the regency, but his earlier work had affinities with the school of Boulle, while his later pieces were full of originality.

As Geoffrey Bellaigue suggests, "Cressent was in his opinion and in that of his contemporaries more than just a skilled cabinet maker and sculptor...he was a collector of refined taste and a talented designer".

Cressent was also a sculptor, and among his work is a bronze bust of Louis d'Orléans, Duke of Chartres, the son of Philippe II, Duke of Orléans (later Regent of France for Louis XV), for whom Cressent had made one of the finest examples of French furniture of the 18th century the famous medaillier now in the Bibliothèque Nationale. Cressent's bronze mounts were executed with a sharpness of finish and a grace and vigour of outline which were excelled by his contemporary Jacques Caffieri.

The work of identification is rendered comparatively easy in his case by the fact that he published catalogues of three sales of his work. These catalogues are highly characteristic of the man, who shared in no small degree the personal bravura of Cellini, and could sometimes execute almost as well. He did not hesitate to describe himself as the author of a clock worthy to be placed in the very finest cabinets, the most distinguished bronzes, or pieces of the most elegant form adorned with bronzes of extra richness. He worked much in marqueterie, both in tortoiseshell and in brilliant colored woods. He was indeed an artist to whom colour appealed with especial force. The very type and exemplar of the feeling of the regency.

== Examples of work ==
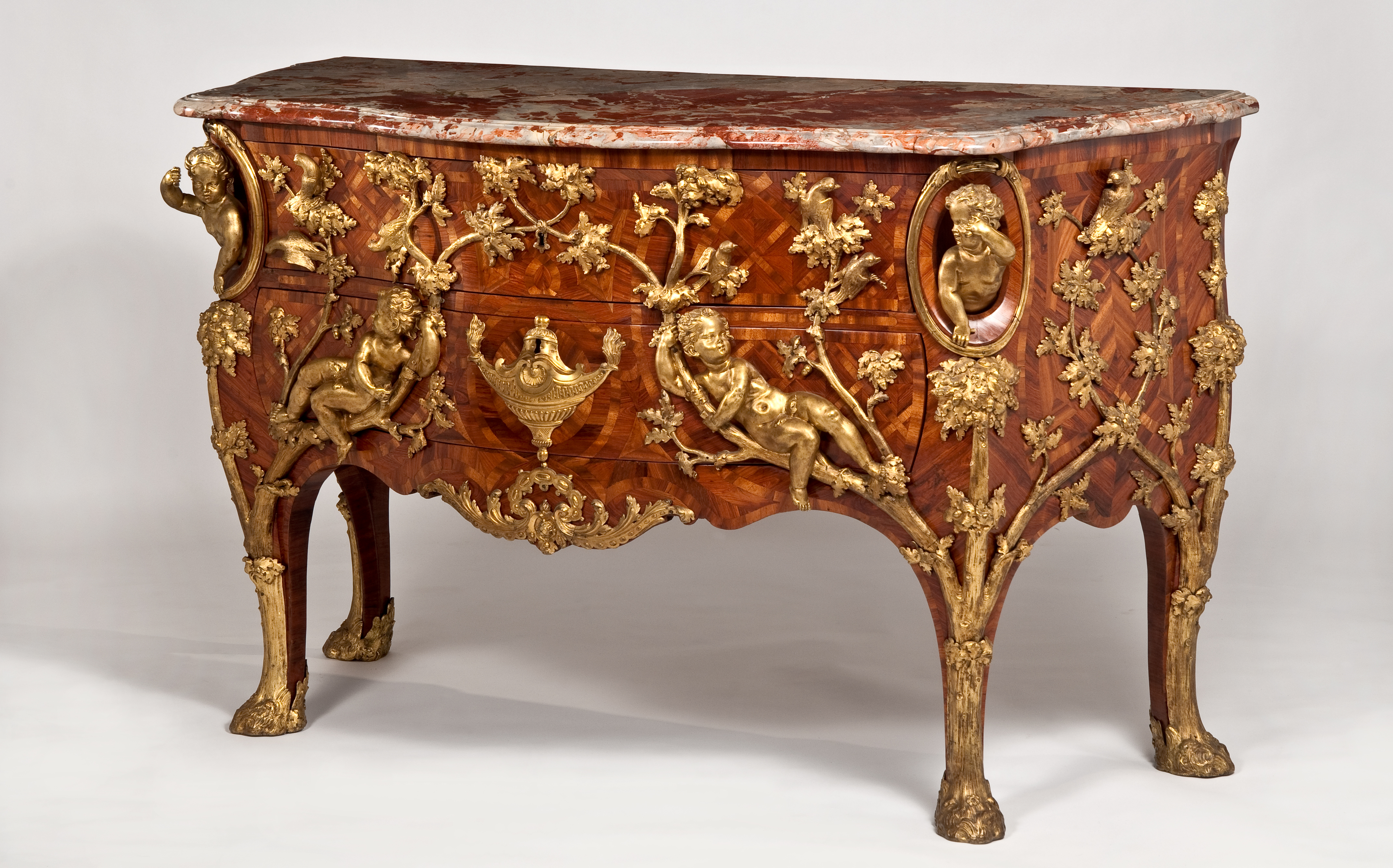
Charles Cressent, Chest of drawers, c. 1730 at Waddesdon Manor

Writing-table, c. 1725, Wallace Collection, UK

Commode, c. 1730, Waddesdon Manor, UK

Commode, ca. 1745-49, Metropolitan Museum of Art, USA

Filing-Cabinet and clock, c. 1740-1745, Wallace Collection, UK

Cartel clock, c. 1747, Wallace Collection, UK

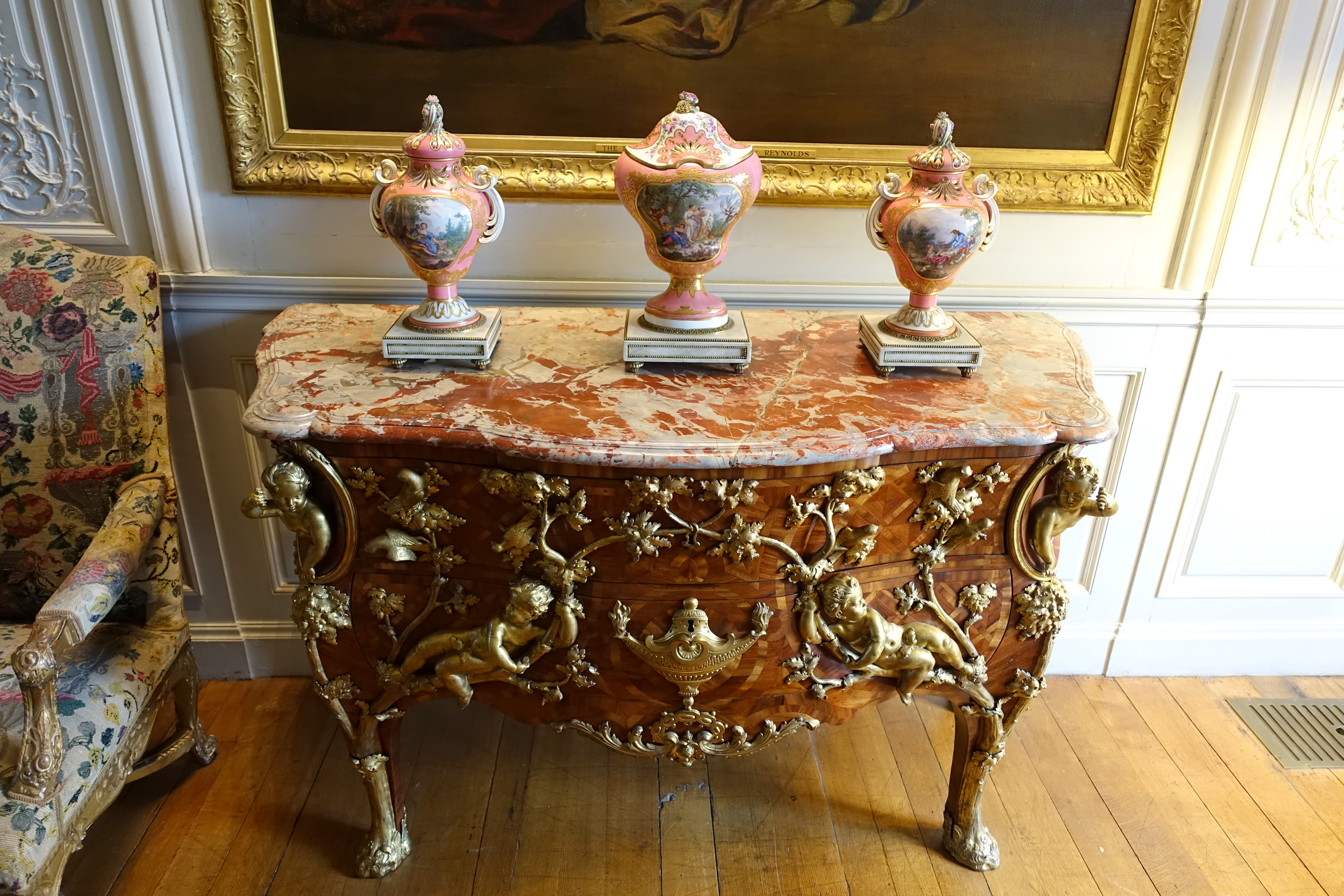
Chest of drawers by Charles Cressent, Paris, c. 1730, with Sèvres porcelain - Waddesdon Manor - Buckinghamshire, England

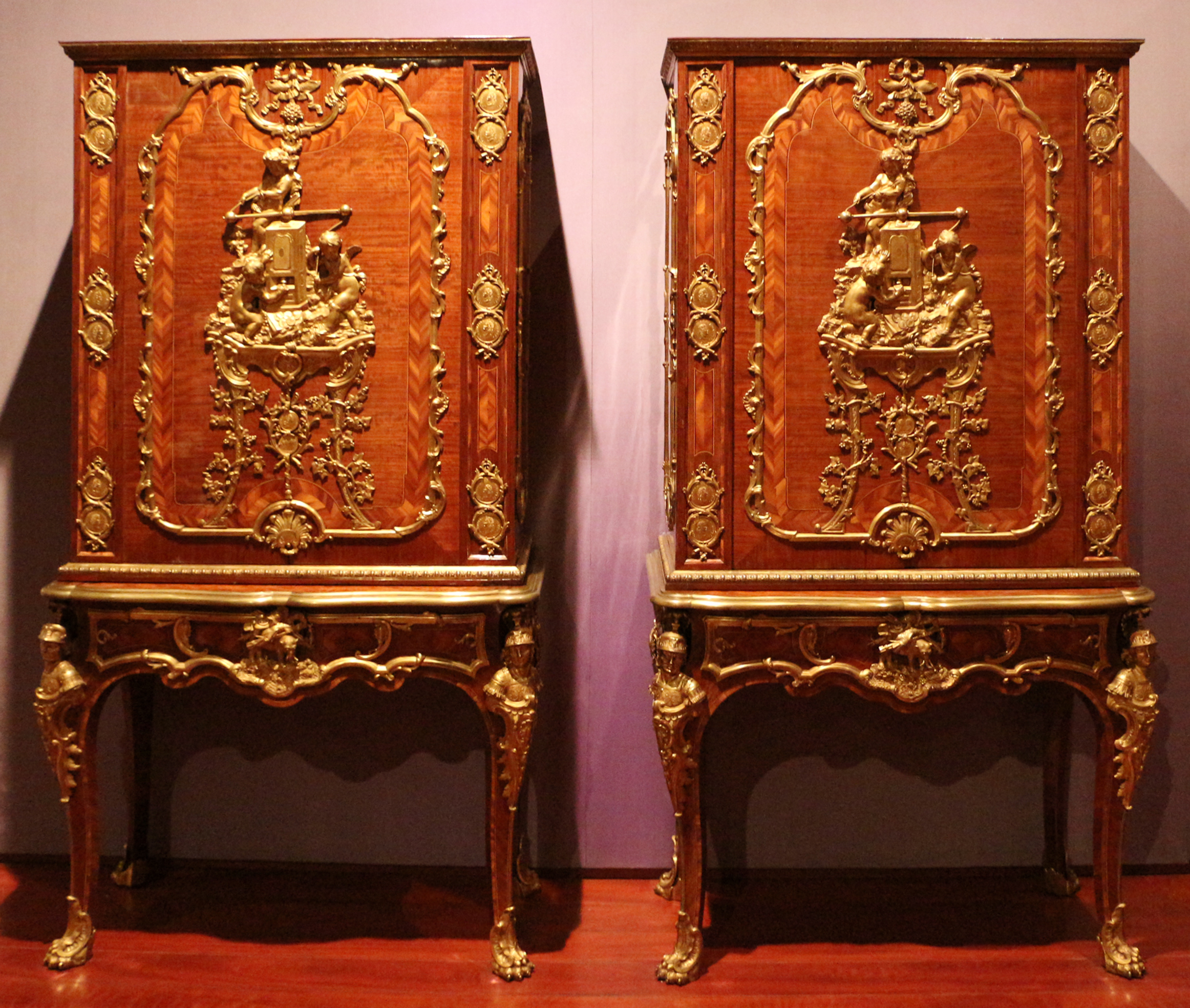
Charles Cressent, coppia di medaglieri, parigi 1750

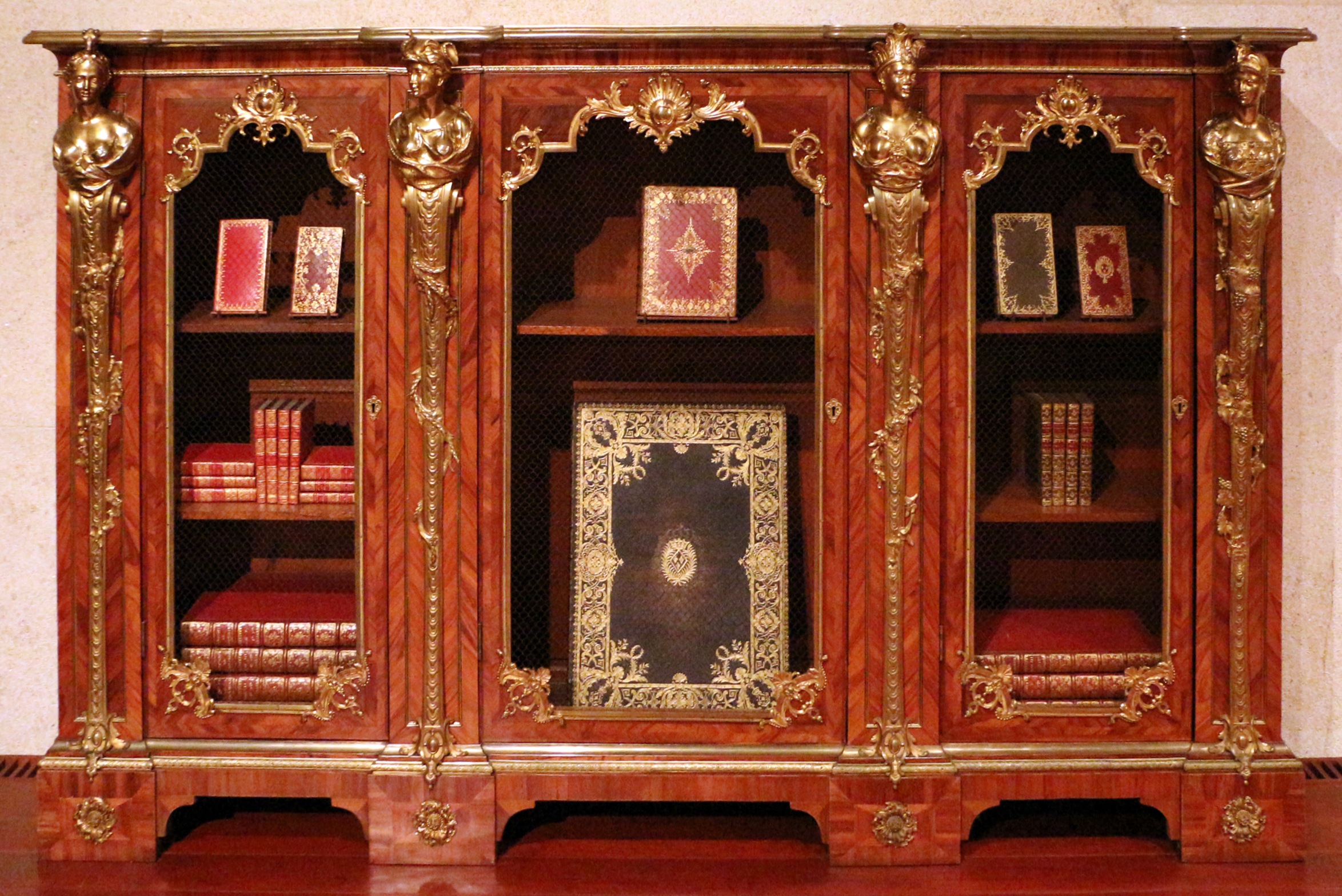
Charles Cressent, coppia di mobili con scaffali da biblioteca, parigi, 1735

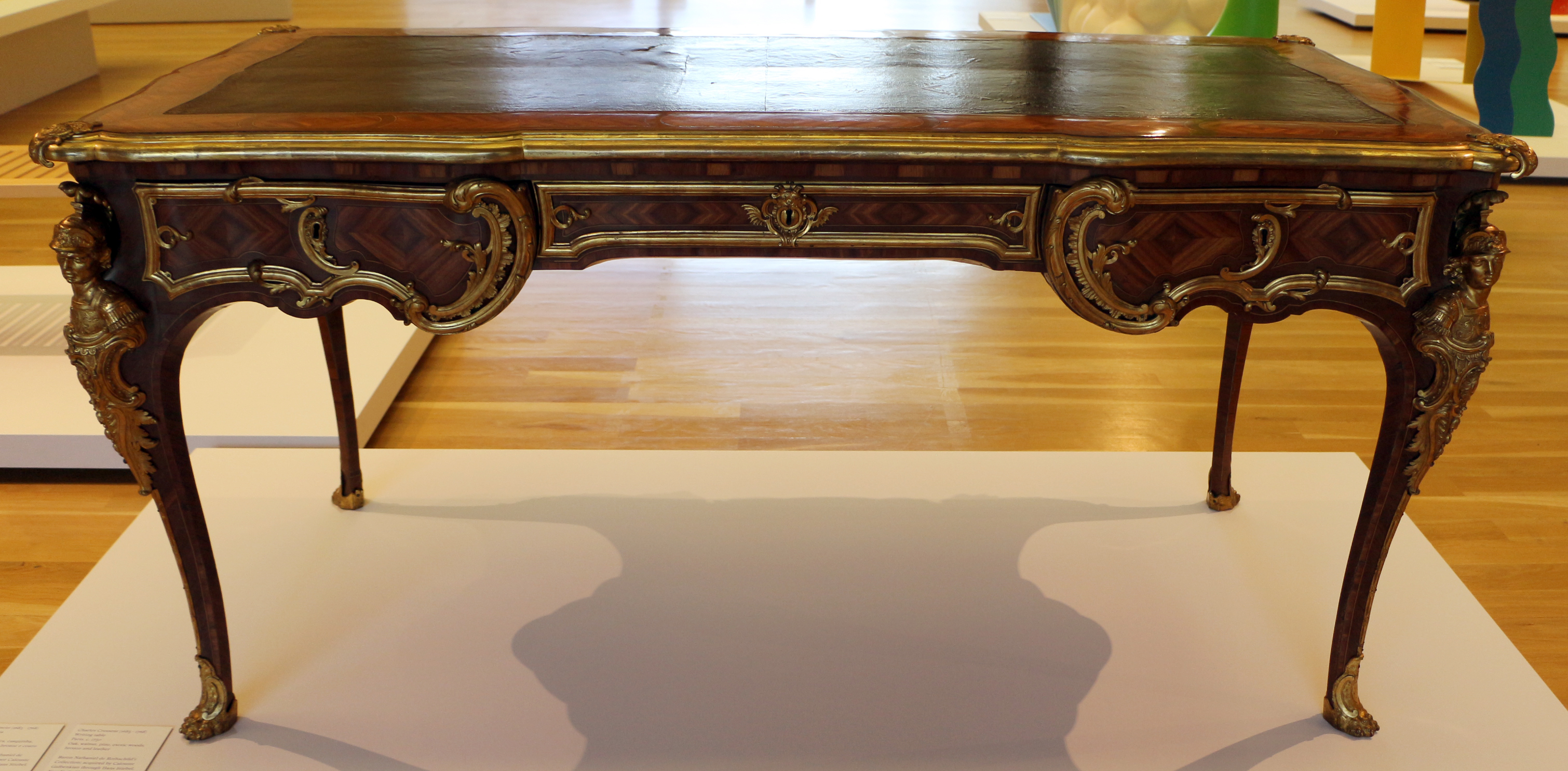
Charles Cressent, tavolo da segreteria, parigi 1750

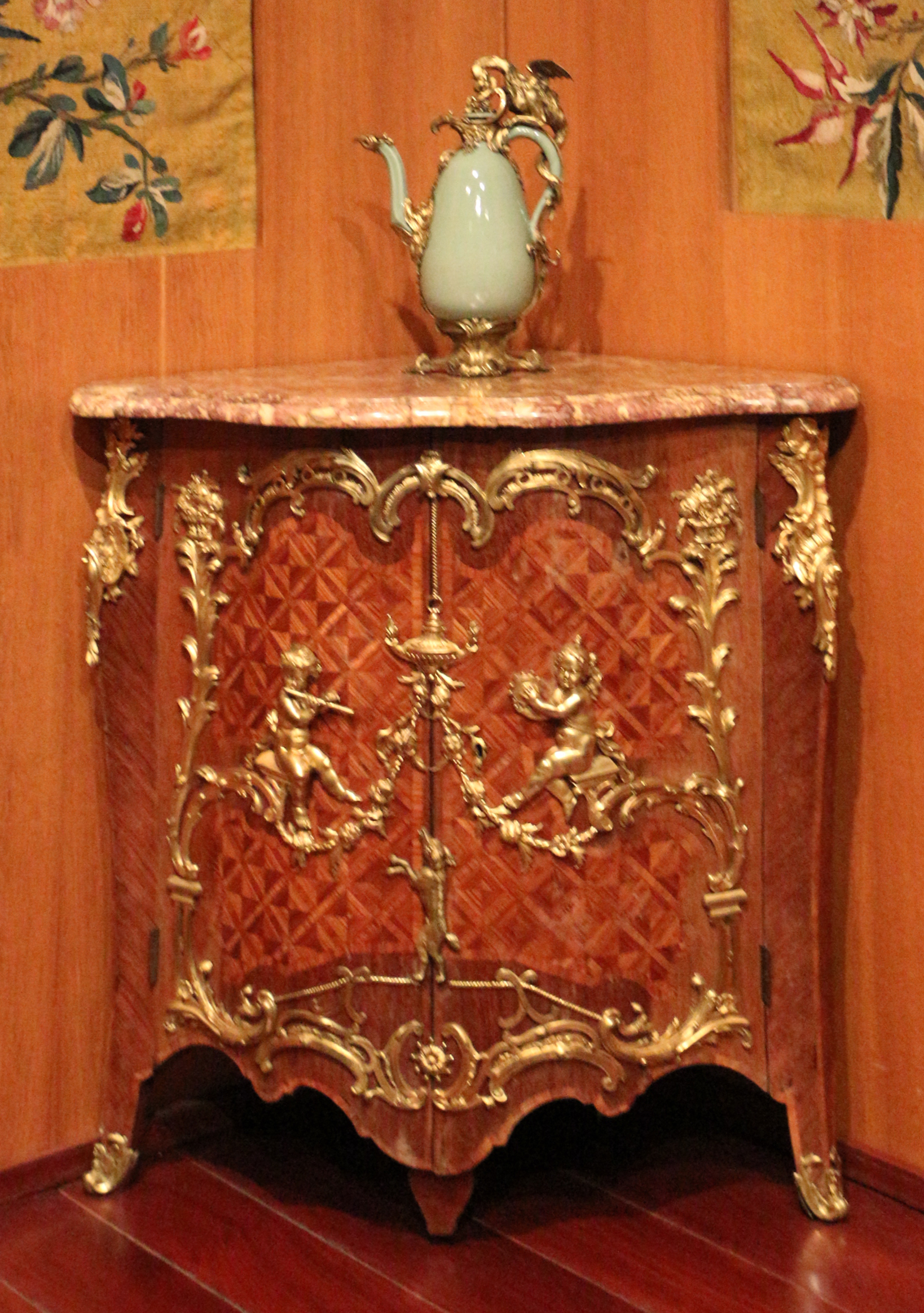
Charles Cressent, cantoniera (da una coppia), parigi 1757-65 ca., con un vaso celadon parigino del 1720-30
