= Juste-Aurèle Meissonnier =

French goldsmith, sculptor, painter, architect, and furniture designer (1695–1750)

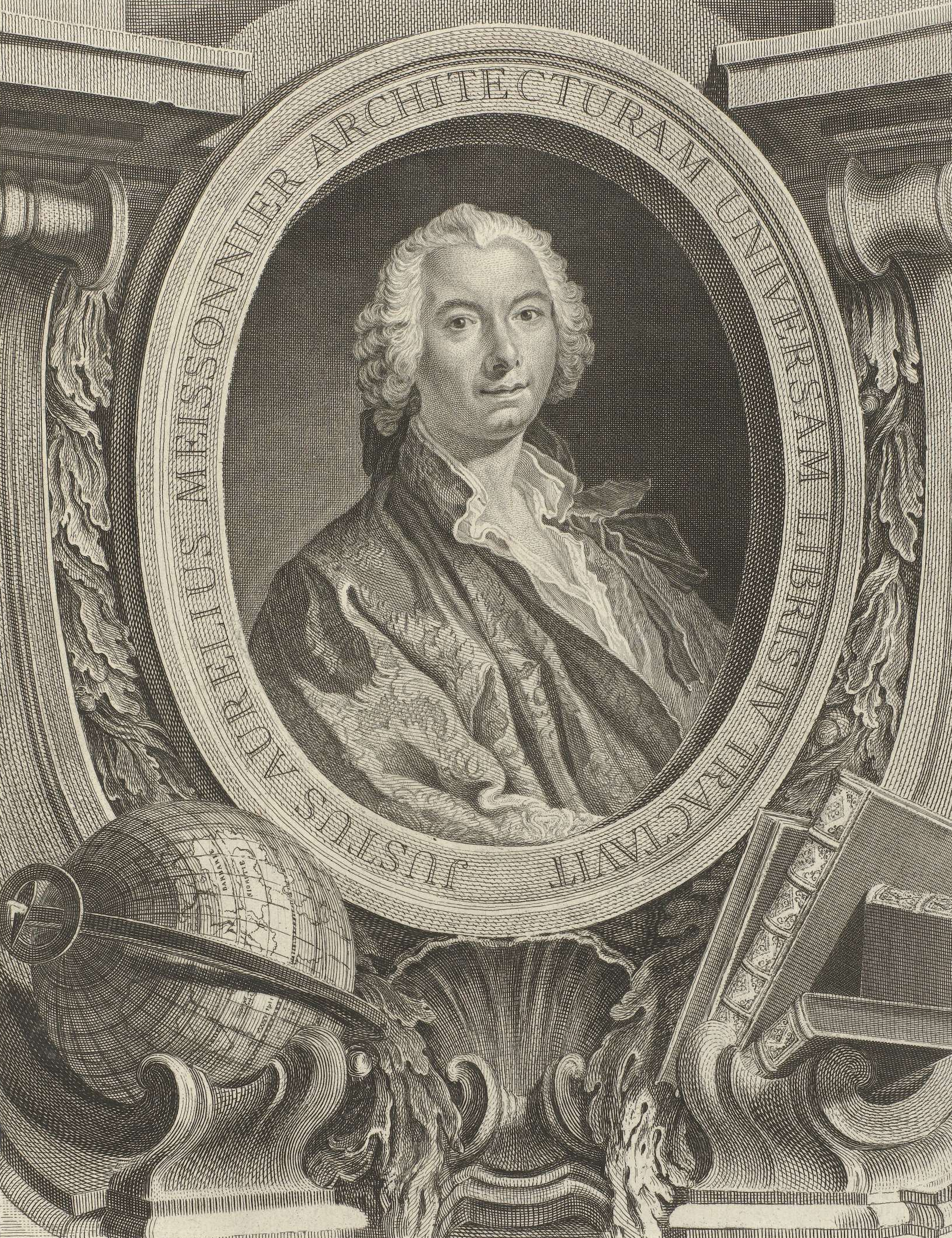
Juste-Aurèle Meissonier

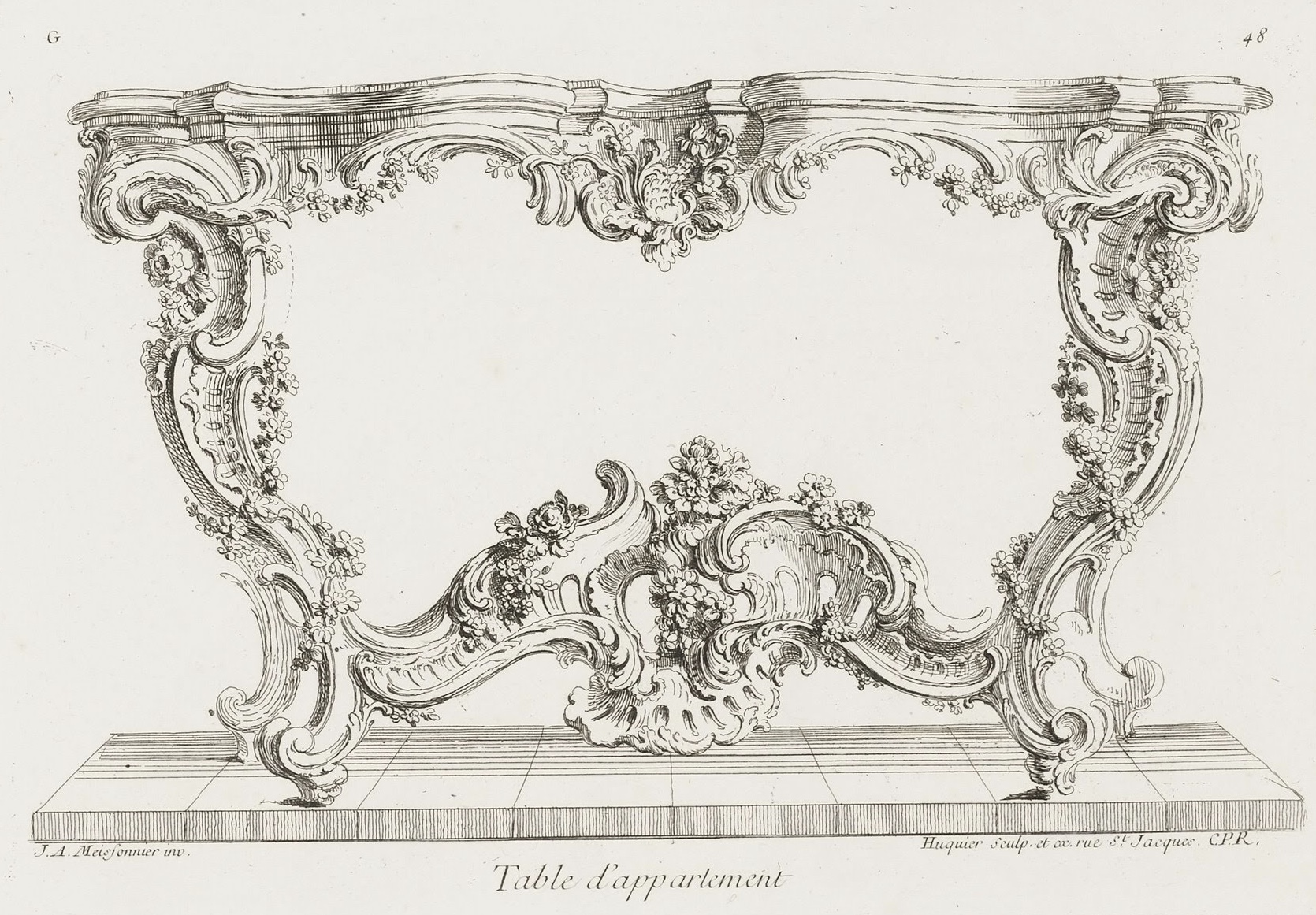
Juste-Aurèle Meissonnier, engraved design for a side table, c. 1730, engraving

Juste-Aurèle Meissonier (French: [ʒyst oʁɛl mɛsɔnje]; 1695 – 31 July 1750) was a French goldsmith, sculptor, painter, architect, and furniture designer.

He was born in Turin, Savoyard state, but became known as a worker in Paris, where he died. His Italian origin and training were probably responsible for the extravagance of his decorative style. He shared, and perhaps distanced, the meretricious triumphs of Oppenord and Germain, since he dealt with the Rococo in its most daring and flamboyant developments.

Rarely did he leave a foot or two of undecorated space; Meissonier carried the style of his day to its extreme and thus achieved great popularity. Like the Scottish brothers Adam at a later day he not only as an architect built houses but as a painter and decorator, covered their internal walls; he designed the furniture and the candlesticks, the silver and the decanters for the table; he was as ready to produce a snuff-box as a watch case or a sword hilt.

Not only in France, but for the nobility of Poland, Portugal and other countries who took their fashions and their taste from Paris, he made designs. His work in gold and silver plates was often graceful and sometimes bold and original. His furniture features strong rocaille elements. He was appointed by Louis XV Dessinateur de la chambre et du cabinet du roi; the post of designer pour les pompes funèbres et galantes was also held along with that of Orfèvre du roi.

For our knowledge of his work we are considerably indebted to his own books of design: Livres d'ornements en trente pièces and Ornements de la carte chronologique. His works are held in the collection of the Cooper-Hewitt, National Design Museum.
