= Louis XVI furniture =

Furniture associated with King Louis XVI of France

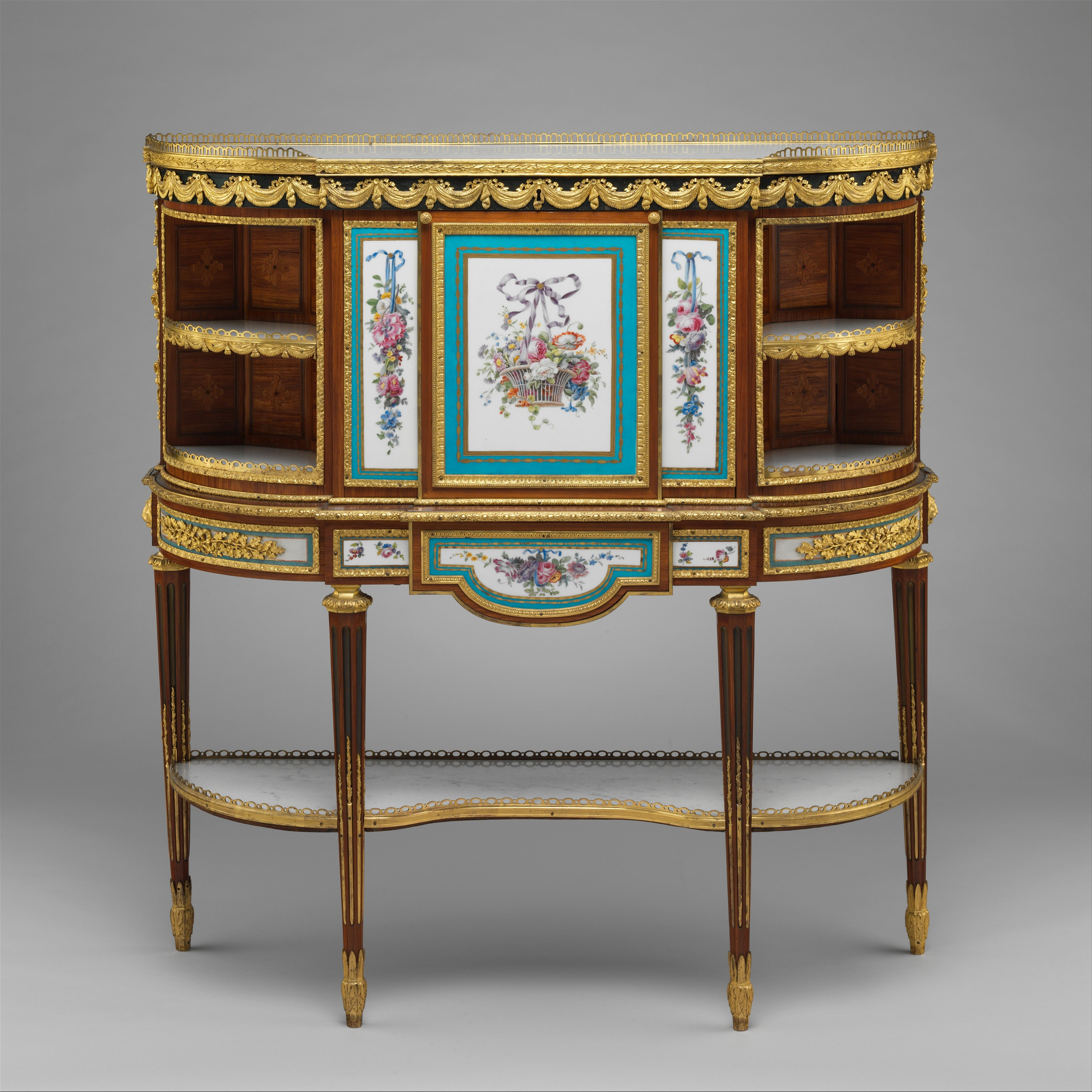
Drop-front desk by Martin Carlin; oak veneered with tulipwood, amaranth, holly, and sycamore; six Sèvres soft-paste porcelain plaques and two painted tin plaques; gilt-bronze mounts; marble shelves; moiré silk (1776) Metropolitan Museum of Art.

Louis XVI furniture is characterized by elegance and neoclassicism, a return to ancient Greek and Roman models. Much of it was designed and made for Queen Marie Antoinette for the new apartments she created in the Palace of Versailles, Palace of Fontainebleau, the Tuileries Palace, and other royal residences. The finest craftsmen of the time, including Jean-Henri Riesener, Georges Jacob, Martin Carlin, and Jean-François Leleu, were engaged to design and make her furniture.

== History ==
With the death of Louis XV on May 10, 1774, his grandson Louis XVI became King of France at age twenty. The new king had little interest in the arts, but his wife, Marie-Antoinette, and her brothers-in-law, the Comte de Provence (the future Louis XVIII) and the Comte d'Artois (the future Charles X), were deeply interested in the arts, gave their protection to artists, and ordered large amounts of furniture in the neoclassical style, inspired by Greco-Roman art. They were followed by the wealthy nobles who furnished their chateaux and Paris town houses in the new style.

The transition from the baroque and the rocaille style to the neoclassical style had begun in about 1760, near the end of the reign of Louis XV. It was advanced by the reports of the discoveries at the archeological sites at Herculaneum and Pompeii. Madame de Pompadour, mistress of Louis XV, had dispatched a group of scholars to Italy to report on the findings. The group included the designer Jean-Charles Delafosse and the Flemish architect, sculptor and engraver Jean-François de Nefforge. Their engravings of Greek and Roman art inspired many furniture designers and particularly the ébénistes, who made the fine marquetry inlaid ornament that decorated chests and tables.

Marie-Antoinette was a promoter of the new style even before she became queen. In 1770, after her marriage to the Dauphin Louis, she took over the apartments of the former queen, Marie Leszczyńska, who had died in 1768. In 1779, she commissioned the architect Richard Mique to completely redo the Cabinet of the Queen. He covered the walls with white satin embroidered with flowers, arabesques and medallions. In 1783, she decided to renew the decor once again, this time with wood panels sculpted and painted white, decorated with gilded neoclassical frames and designs, including sphinxes and tripods, given lightness by bouquets of flowers. The fireplace, made of dark red stone, was ornamented with gilded bronze caryatides. The furniture for the room was made by Jean Henri Riesener and included a commode, a corner table and a secretary inlaid with cedar wood, amarante, and medallions of gilded bronze. It also included a sofa with a gilded frame placed in a niche surrounded by mirrors, and facing the window. This room, with its combination of comfort, intimacy and luxury, is among the most classic examples of Louis XVI style. It has been restored to its original appearance, while some of the original furniture is now in the Wallace Collection in London.

Another notable influence to the style was the work of the British designer Robert Adam, particularly in the design of chairs, and in the use of mahogany wood, which was quickly adapted in France.

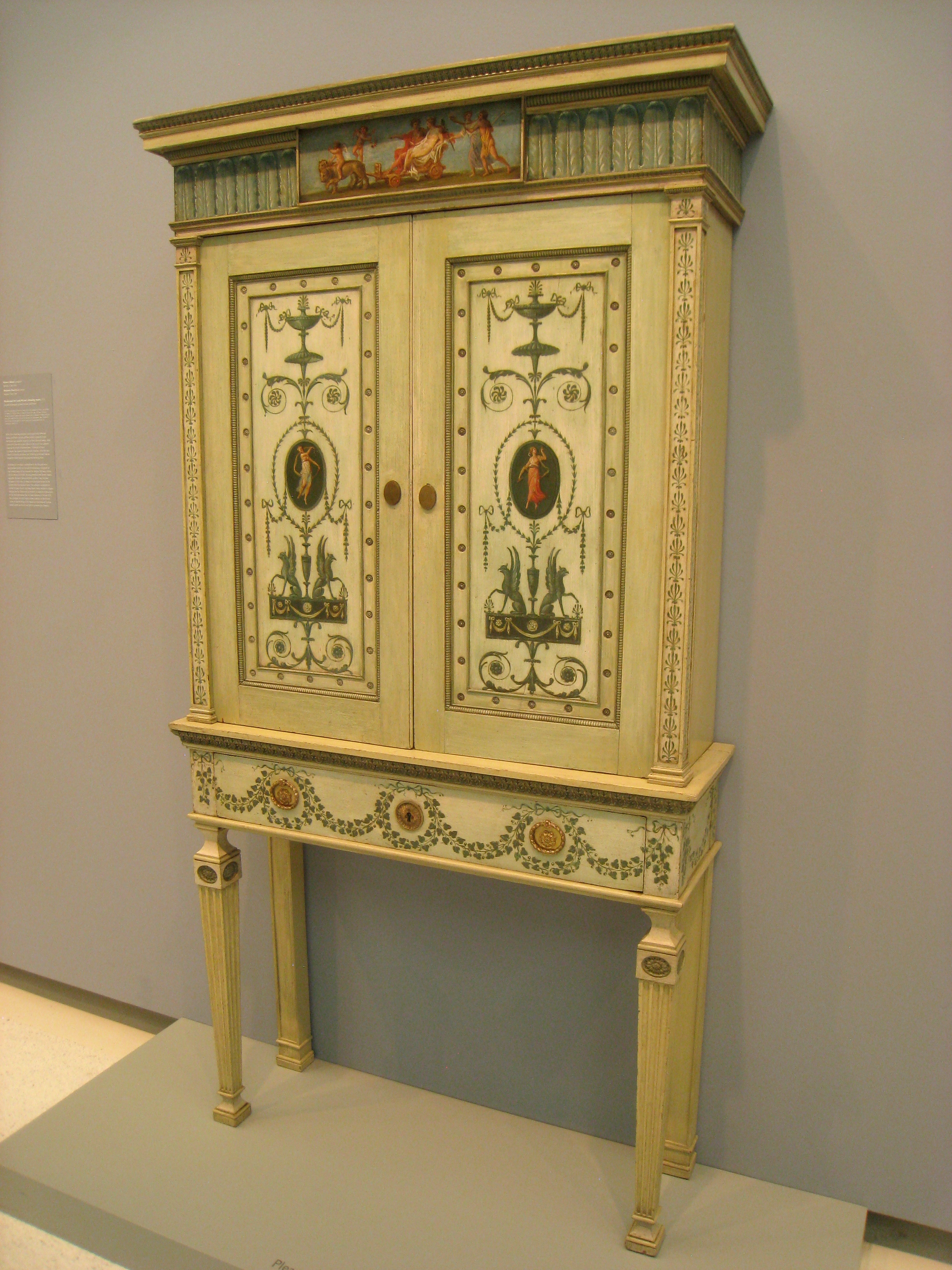
Robert Adam bookcase (1776); his work helped inspire the French neoclassical style

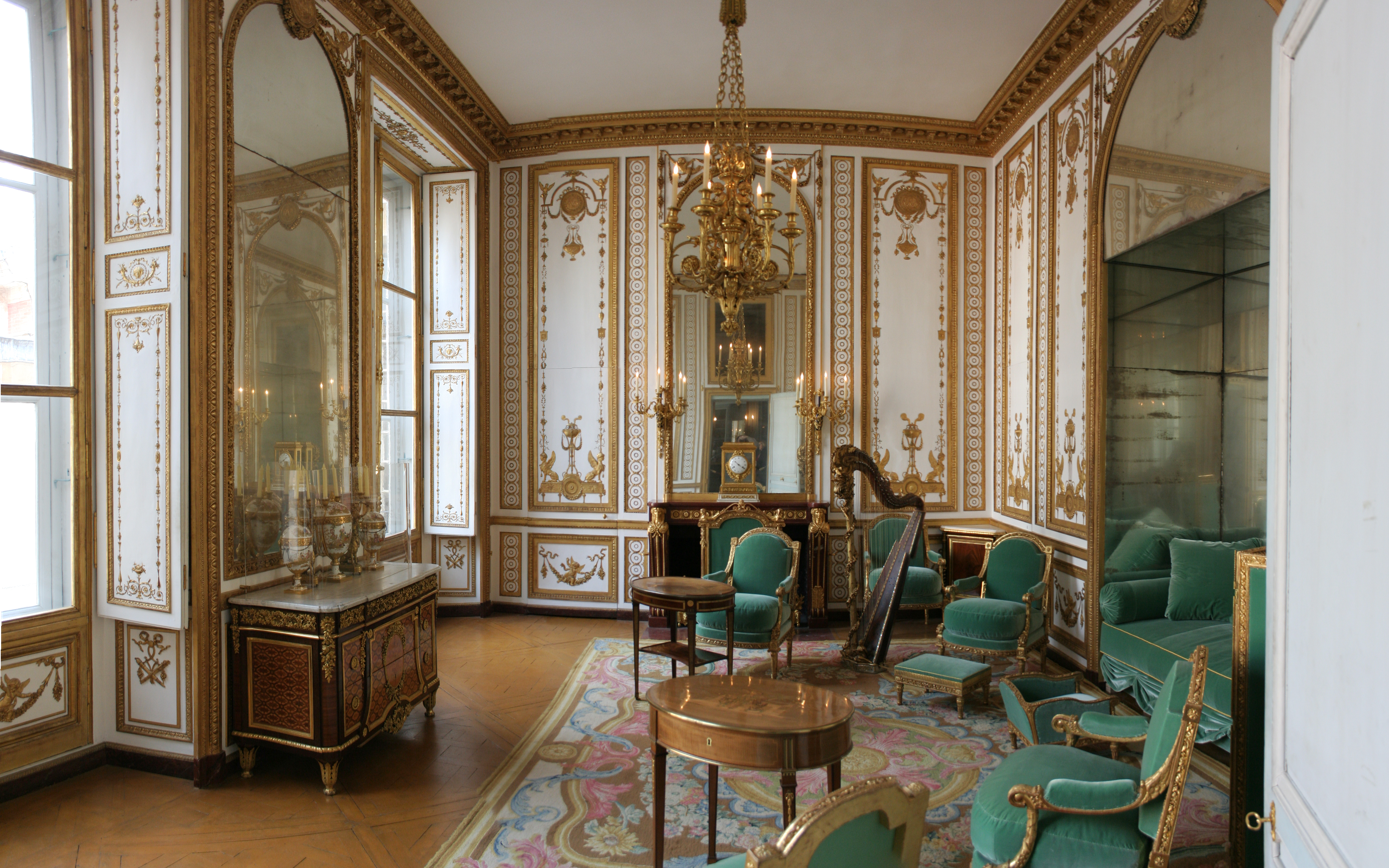
Cabinet doré of Marie-Antoinette, Palace of Versailles (1783)

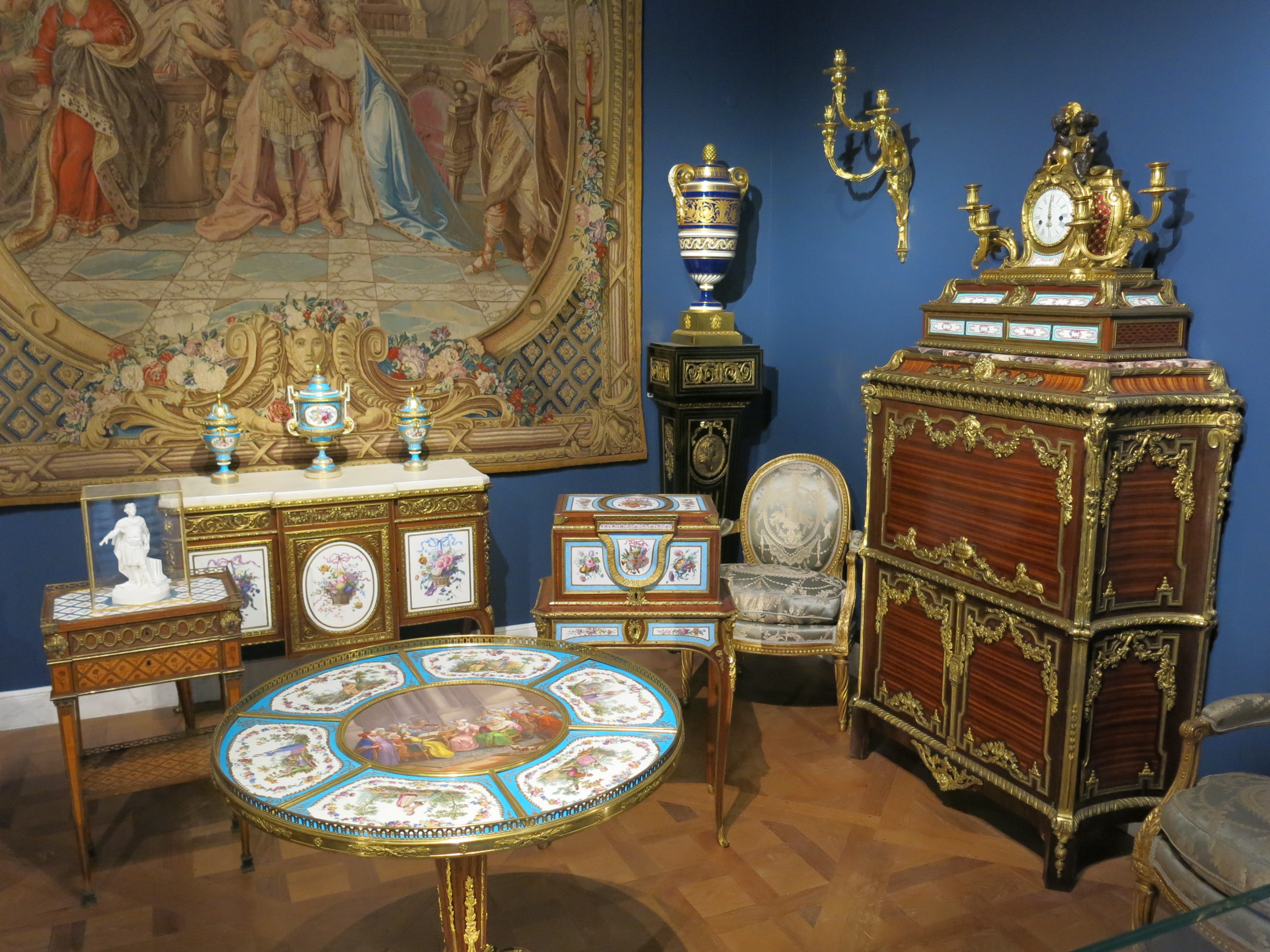
Louis XVI room in the Louvre

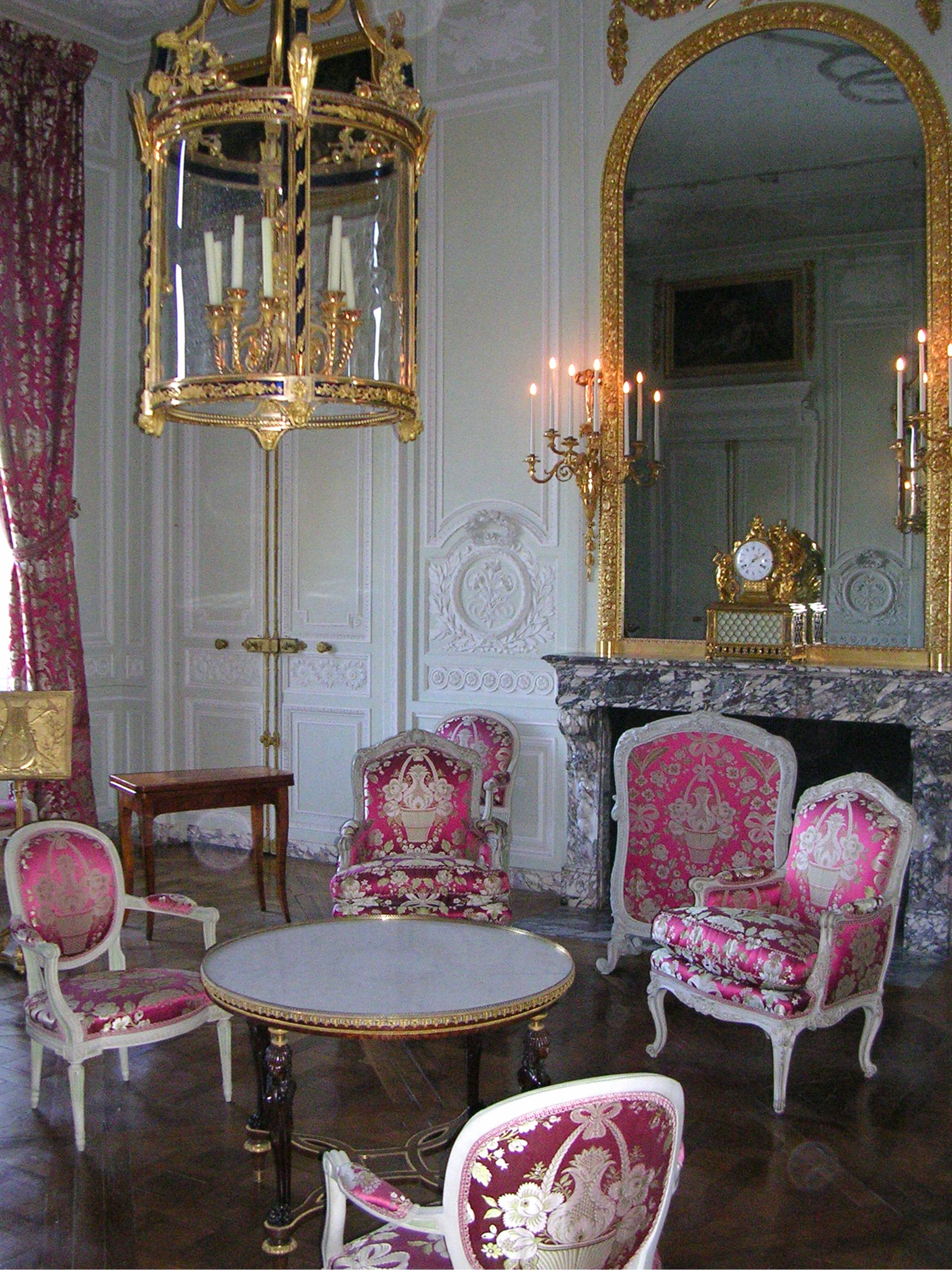
Salon of the Petit Trianon, Versailles

A majority of the top ébénistes were German or of German descent, which gave them a common language with Marie-Antoinette. The most prominent figures under Louis XVI were Jean Henri Riesener, who received the title of ébéniste ordinaire of the royal household in 1774. His main rival was Jean-François Leleu, one of the few who was not German. Other ébénistes, including Martin Carlin and Adam Weisweiler, worked primarily for furniture merchants who supplied the wealthy Parisian upper class. They developed a new genre, decorating furniture with plaques of Sèvres porcelain or lacquered wood panels. The ébéniste David Roentgen kept his workshop in Germany, though many of his clients were in Paris. He became particularly famous for his elaborate desks, which frequently had mechanical folding features.

The French Revolution caused the dispersal of the royal furniture; most of the owners went to the guillotine, or fled into exile. Their furniture confiscated and was sold by the successive governments in enormous lots, with the proceeds helping the finance the long wars of the period. The furnishings of the Palace of Versailles was auctioned off between Sunday, August 25, 1793, until 11 August 1794, and were widely scattered. Many of the buyers were British, and some of the finest items went to the British royal family and to the Wallace Collection. In the 19th century, many of the pieces of furniture migrated again, sold by British aristocrats to wealthy Americans. Extensive collections are found today in the Museum of Decorative Arts and Louvre in Paris; the Wallace Collection and Victoria and Albert Museum in London; the Metropolitan Museum in New York; and the Getty Museum in Los Angeles.

== Craftsmen, merchants, designers ==
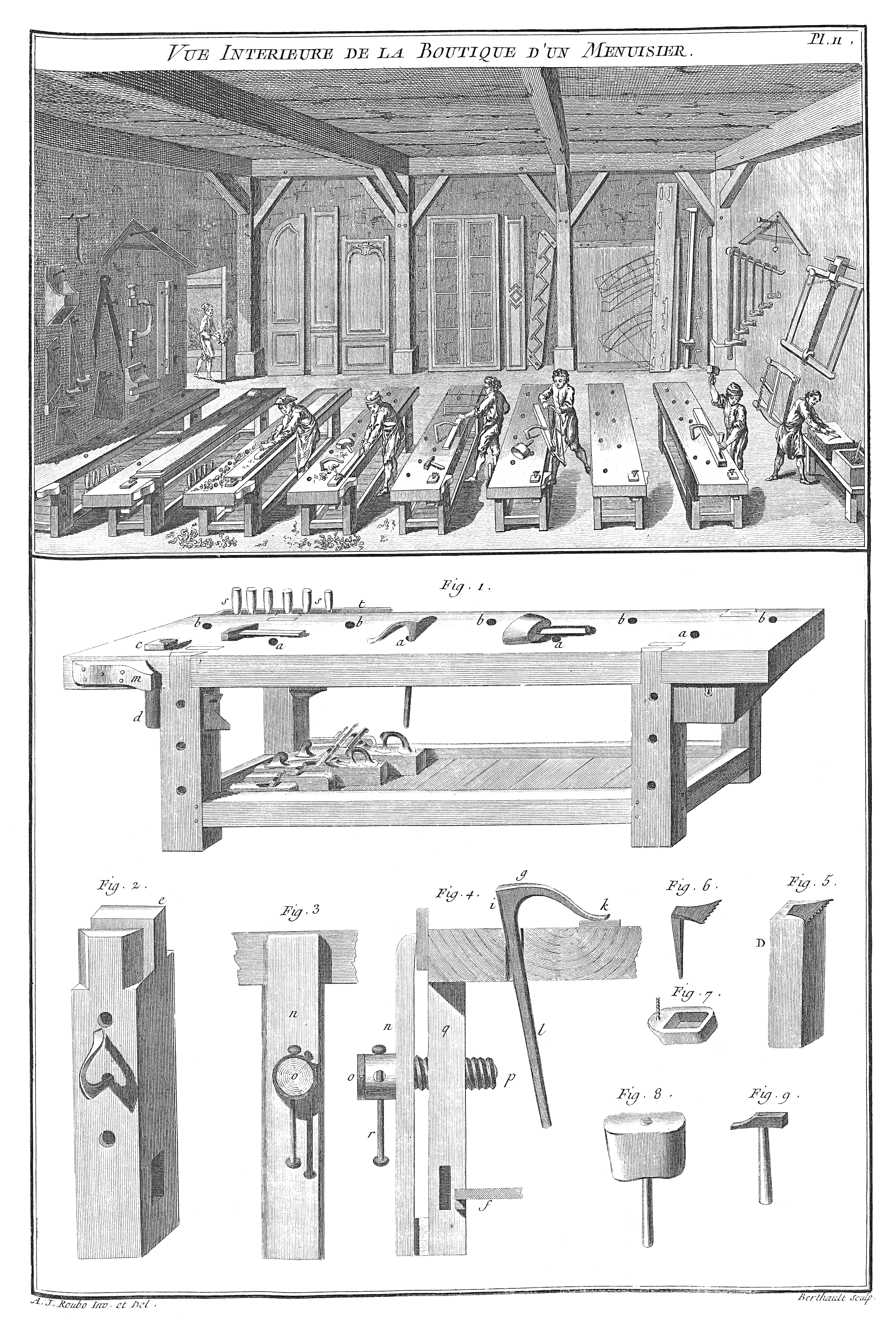
Workshop and tools of a menuisier, by André Jacob Roubo, 1769.

The fine furniture of the period was made by craftsmen who belonged to guilds or corporations which strictly regulated the work of their members, as well as the access to the profession. The reform-minded prime minister of Louis XVI, Turgot, attempted to suppress the power of the corporations in 1776, but, meeting fierce resistance from the artisans, he withdrew his reforms, and then, a few months later, was forced to resign himself.

The work of making furniture was strictly divided into several crafts:

- Menuisiers were allowed to work only on the wooden frame.
- Ébénistes applied the marquetry; very thin plaques of different colored woods, to make the designs.
- Fondeurs-ciseleurs made the bronze ornaments on the furniture
- Fondeurs-Doreurs gilded the ornaments.
- Peintres-doreurs painted and gilded wooden furniture, beds and wood panels.
- Tapissiers made the upholstery that covered the chairs and beds

In addition to the craftsmen, there were the marchands-merciers, the merchants who met with clients, took the orders and commissioned the work, and the ornementistes, gradually becoming known as décorateurs, who designed the furniture.

An estampille, or stamp of the craftsmen, was required on the finished work. The menuisiers made the stamp of their name or initials on the bottom of chairs, while the ébénistes put their names under the crossbeam of bureaus or under the marble tops of consoles. Many of the marks today are difficult to read, and counterfeit marks were not unknown, since they could greatly increase the value of the furniture.

== Materials ==
The body of the furniture, the part crafted by menuisiers, was usually made of woods found in France. Cherry wood and walnut were often used, especially in regional furniture. Beech was commonly used for chairs, since it was solid, easily sculpted, and could be easily gilded and painted. Oak was rarely used, because it was hard and difficult to carve. It was usually reserved for frames and mountings.

The decorative woods for marquetry were termed Bois des Indes and usually came from South America or the West Indies. They were often named by their color rather than botanical name; bois de rose, bois de violette, and bois d'amaranthe. The late Louis XVI period, and a passion for things English, brought an enthusiasm for mahogany.

== Chairs and sofas ==
The chairs of the Louis XV period were characterized by elegance, lightness and simplicity of form. The most notable craftsmen of chairs were Georges Jacob, furnisher to the Royal Garde-Meuble, or furniture depot, from 1774, and Jean-Baptiste-Claude Sené who obtained the title of official fourniseur in 1785.

The basic types of chairs were little changed from the Louis XV style, but a wider variety of forms appeared, particularly in the dossier, or back, of the armchairs. These included en raquette, en chapeau, en lyre, en grebe, en anse de pannier, and, the most popular, en médaillon. Another popular variation of dossier was the à chapeau du gendarme, or policeman's hat. The most classical elements of the chairs were the legs; they were usually carved like Roman or Greek columns tapering to the end, a style called effilés. The decoration of upholstery, following the taste of Marie-Antoinette, and to match the decoration on the walls, was usually floral,

The chaise voyeuse, a type invented under Louis XV, remained popular, It featured an armrest on the top, was designed so the person sitting could sit astride with his arms on the top of the chair back, for playing cards. A set of four of these chairs was made by Jean-Baptiste-Claude Sené for Madame Elizabeth, sister of Marie-Antoinette, and was delivered in 1789, the year of the beginning of the French Revolution.

Another original type that appeared under Louis XVI was the Fauteul de Bureau, or office chair. A set was made by Henri Jacob, brother of Georges Jacob, in about 1785, made of carved walnut, cane and lester. The seat was mounted on a circular platform, and could turn around, the first recorded swivel chair. In 1790 Henri Jacob produced a series of drawings of fanciful "Etruscan" furniture, inspired by a British movement and anticipating the wave of neoclassicism of the French Directory.

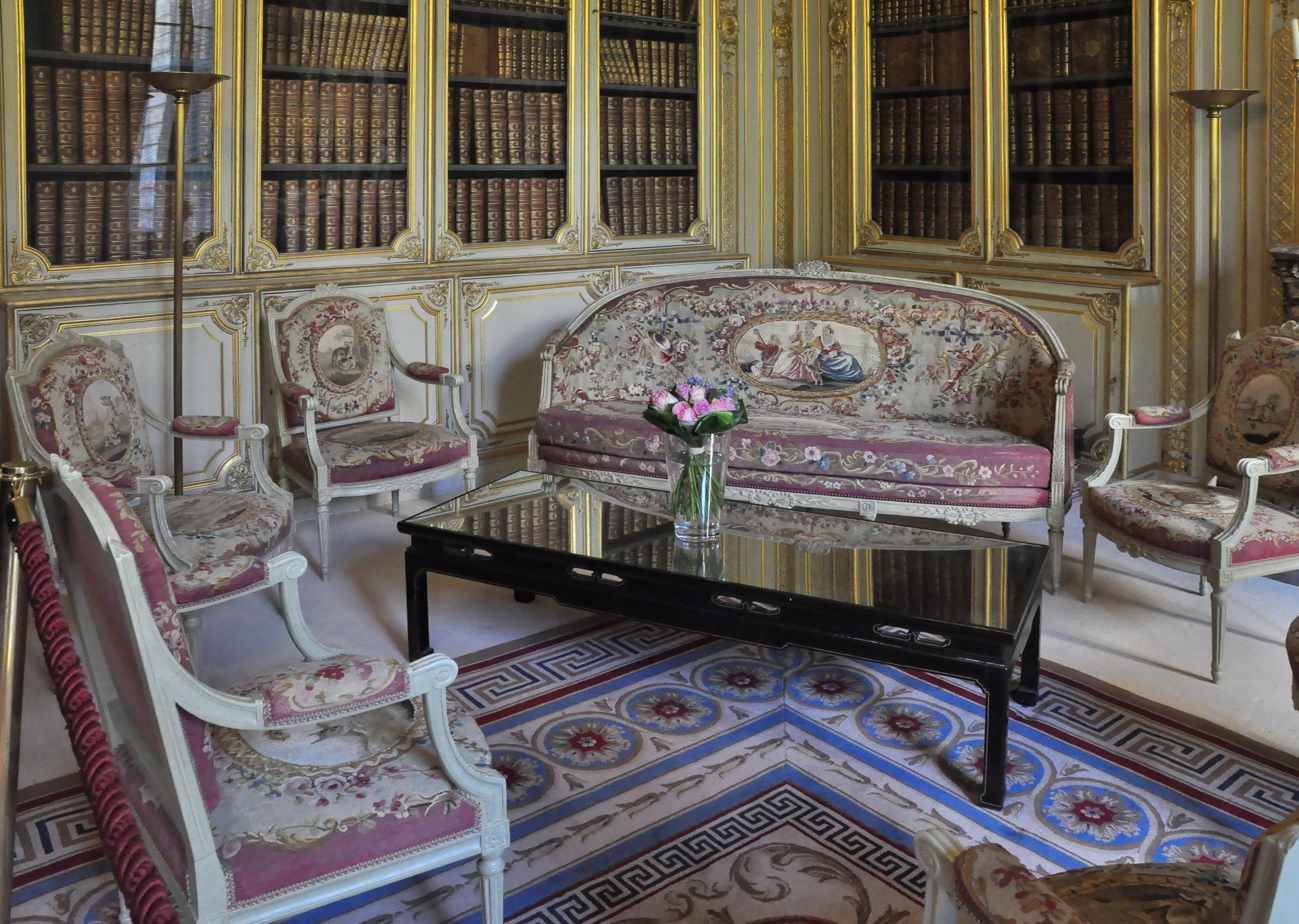
Armchairs and canape with Aubusson tapestry upholstery, Hotel de Bourvallais (now Ministry of Justice)

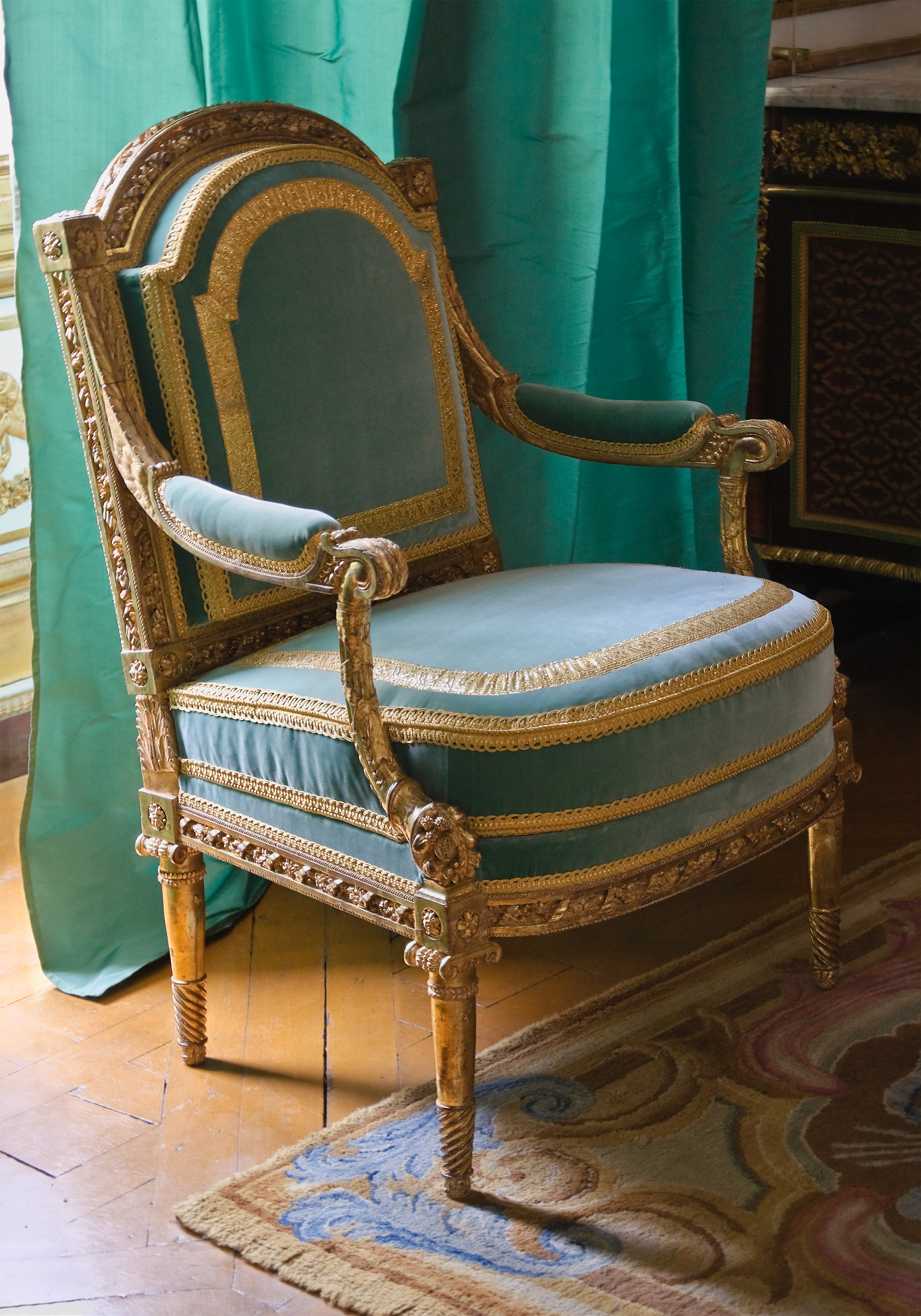
Armchair by Georges Jacob with Chapeau de Gendarme back, Palace of Versailles

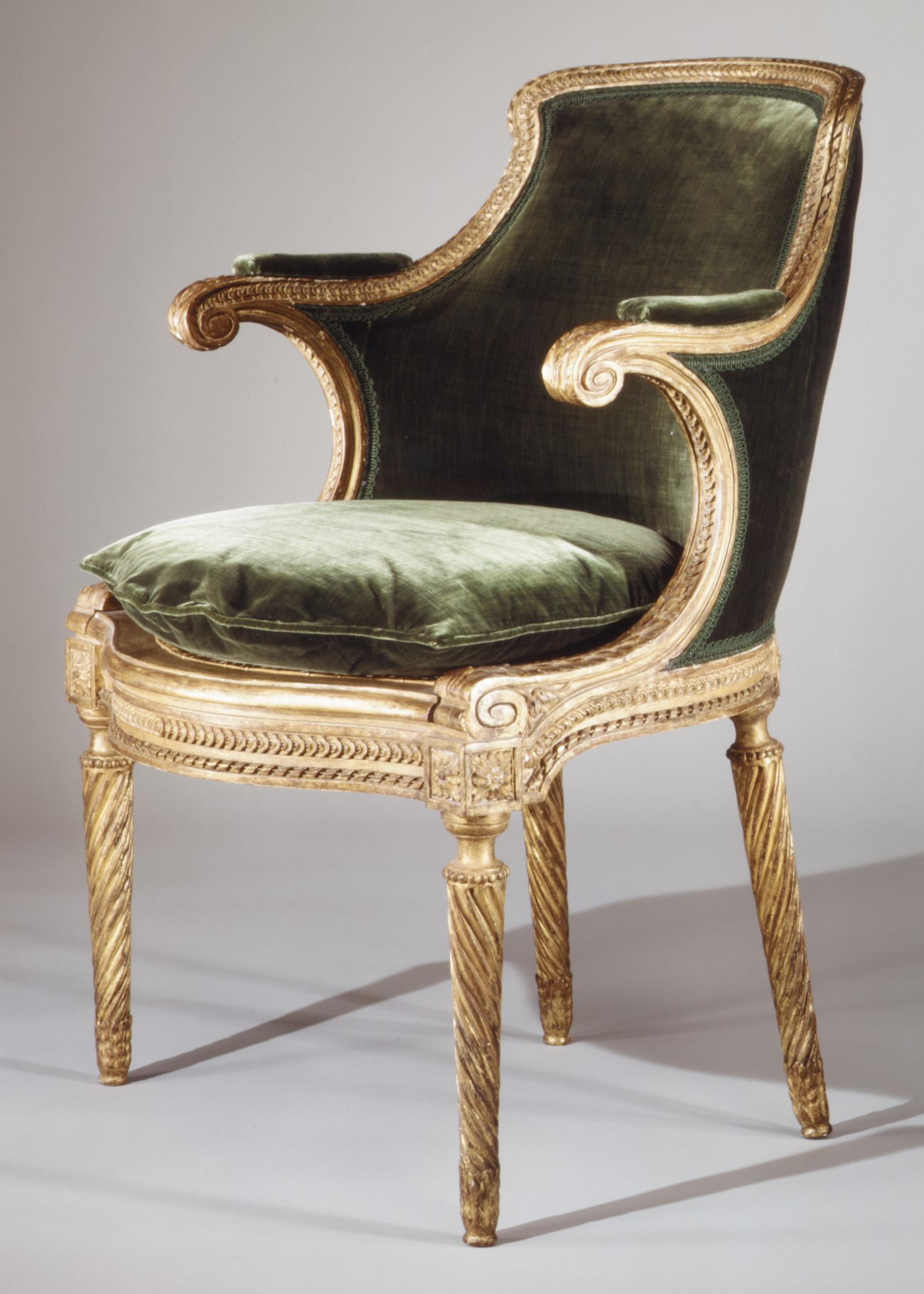
Armchair by Georges Jacob

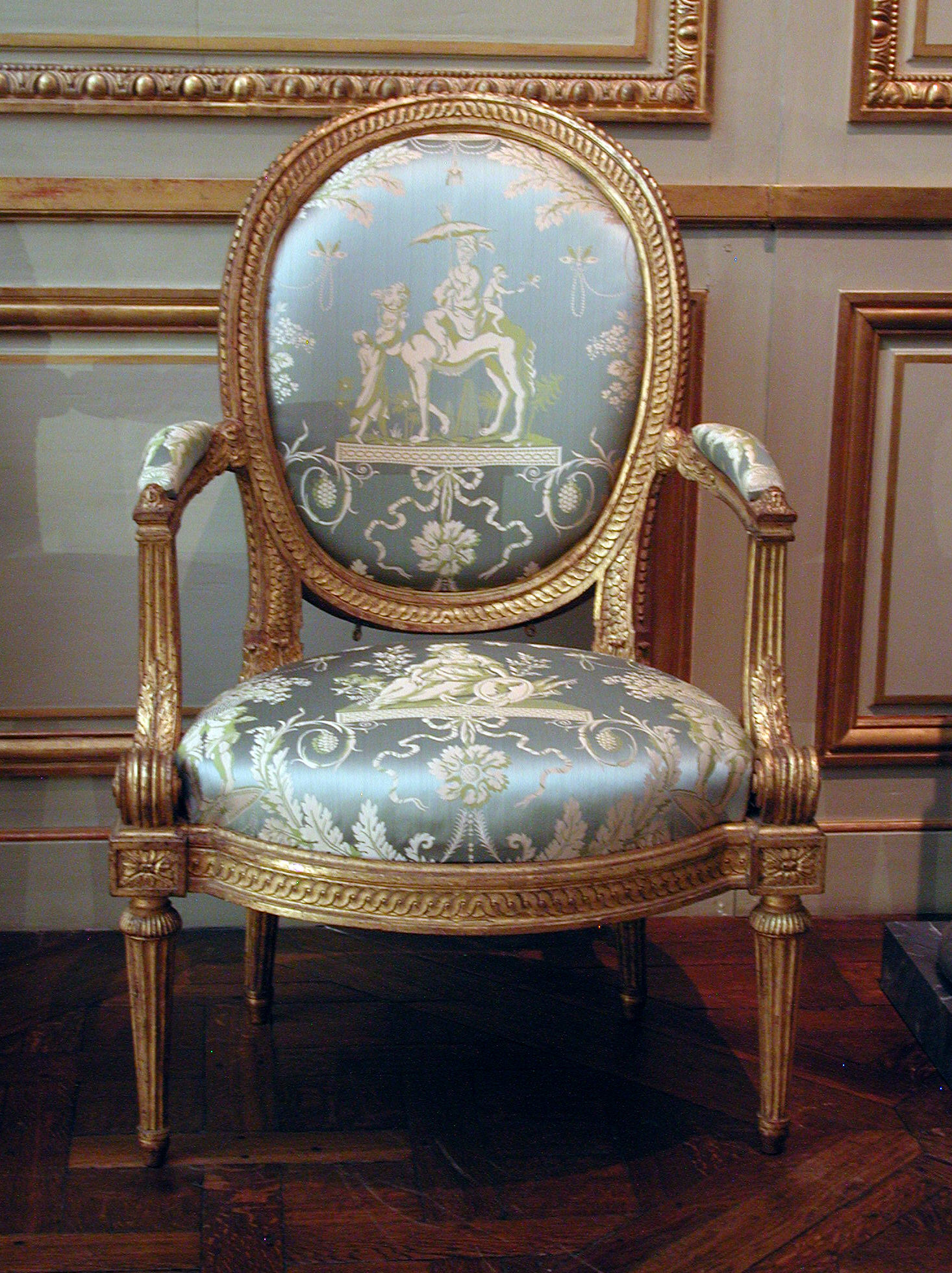
Armchair en medallion by Louis Delanois (1787)

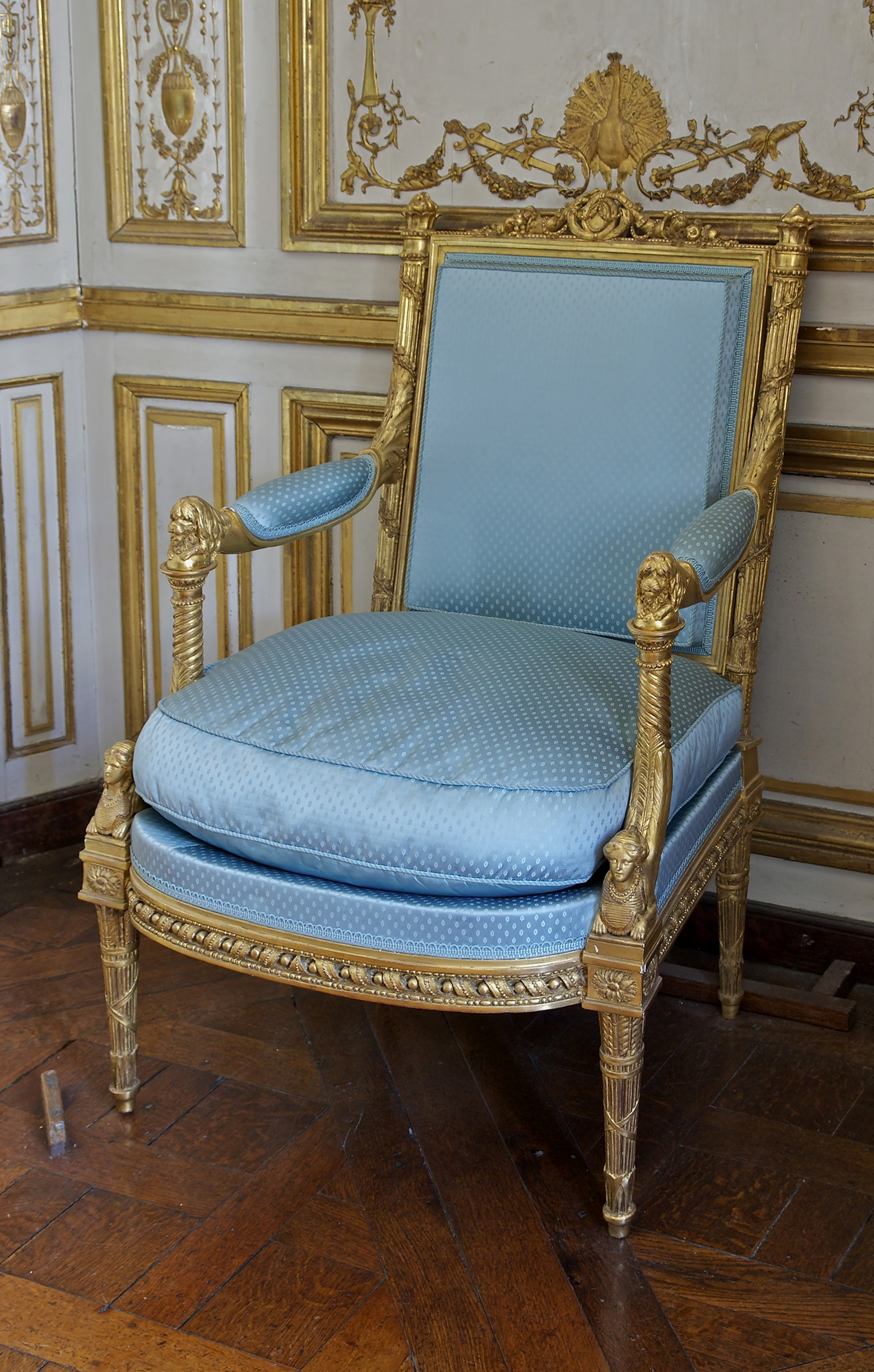
Armchair à la Reine by Georges Jacob for the apartments of Marie-Antoinette at Versailles (1781)

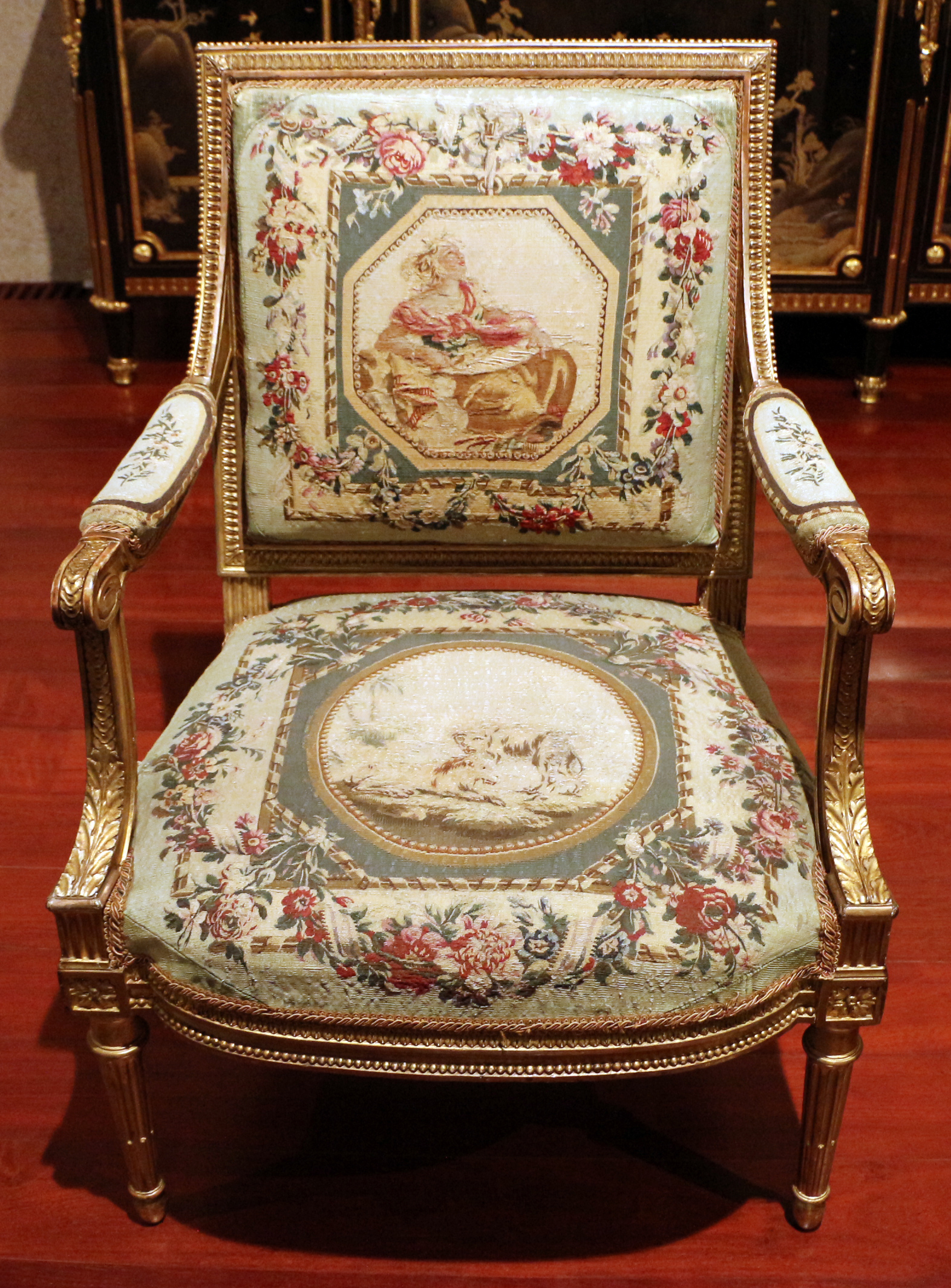
Armchair by Jean-Baptiste-Claude Sené with Beauvais tapestry upholstery (1780–85)

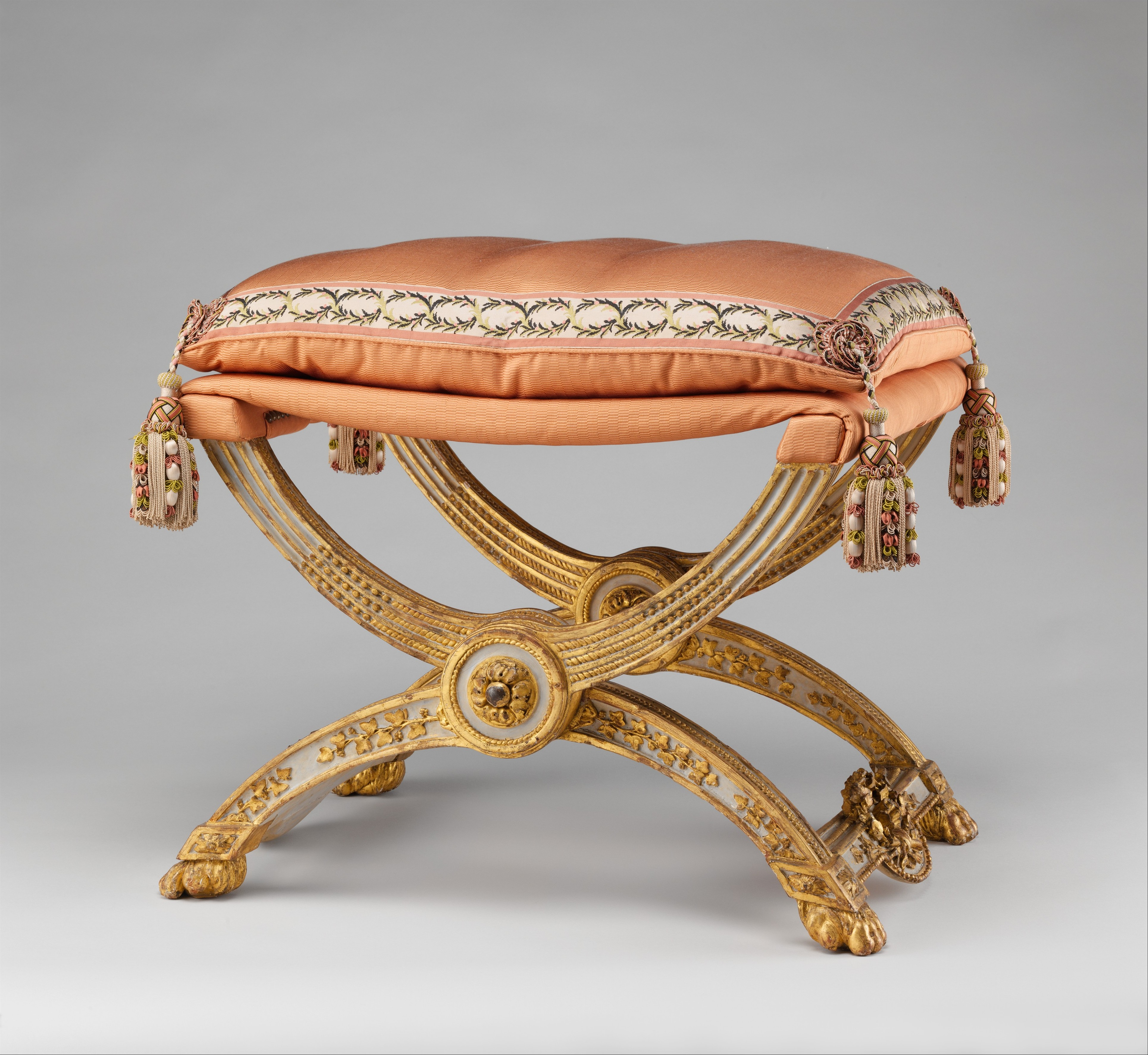
Folding stool by Jean-Baptiste-Claude Sené (1786), Metropolitan Museum

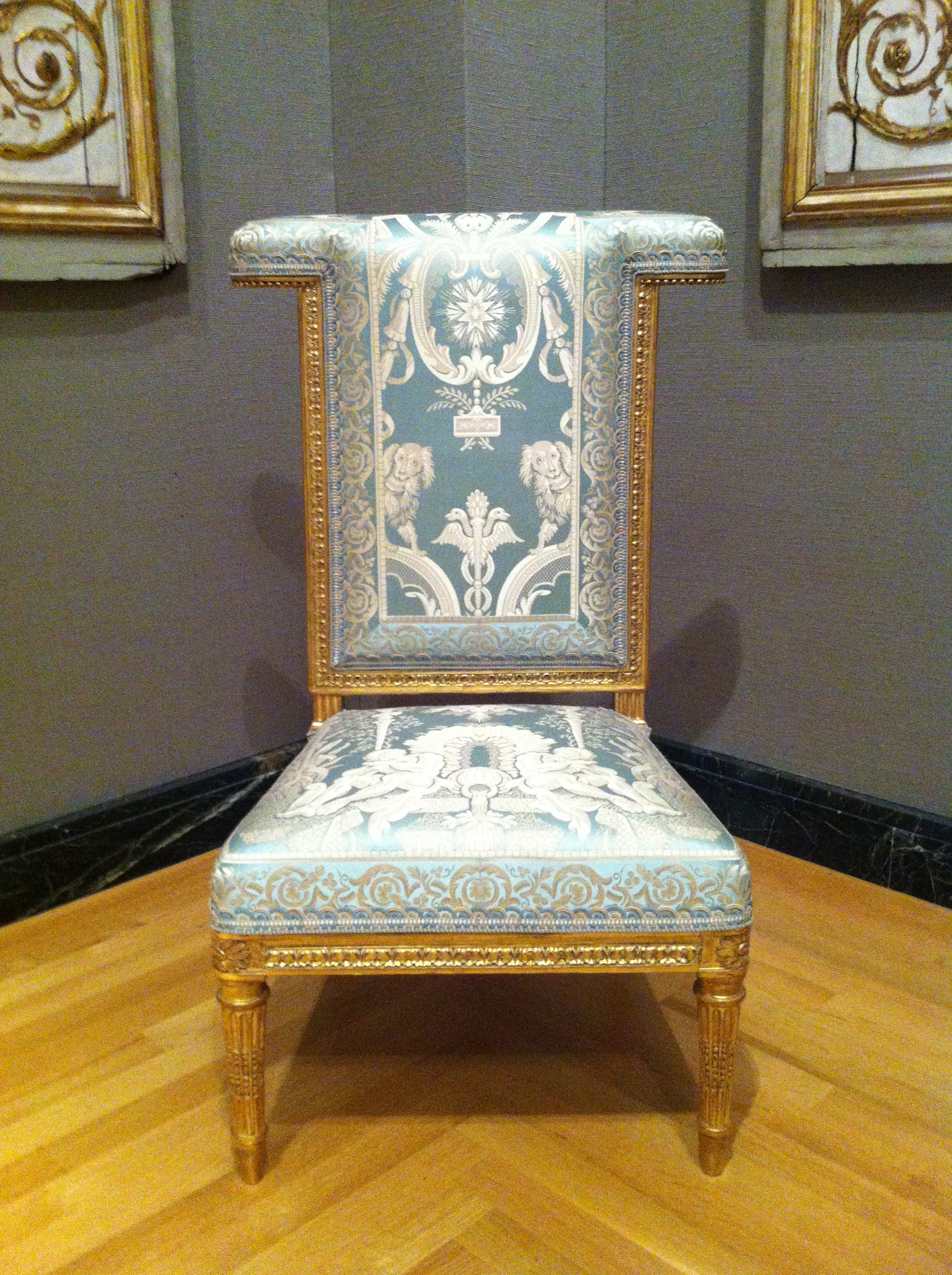
Chaise Voyeause for card playing by Jean-Baptiste-Claude Sené (1787), Museum of Fine Arts, Boston

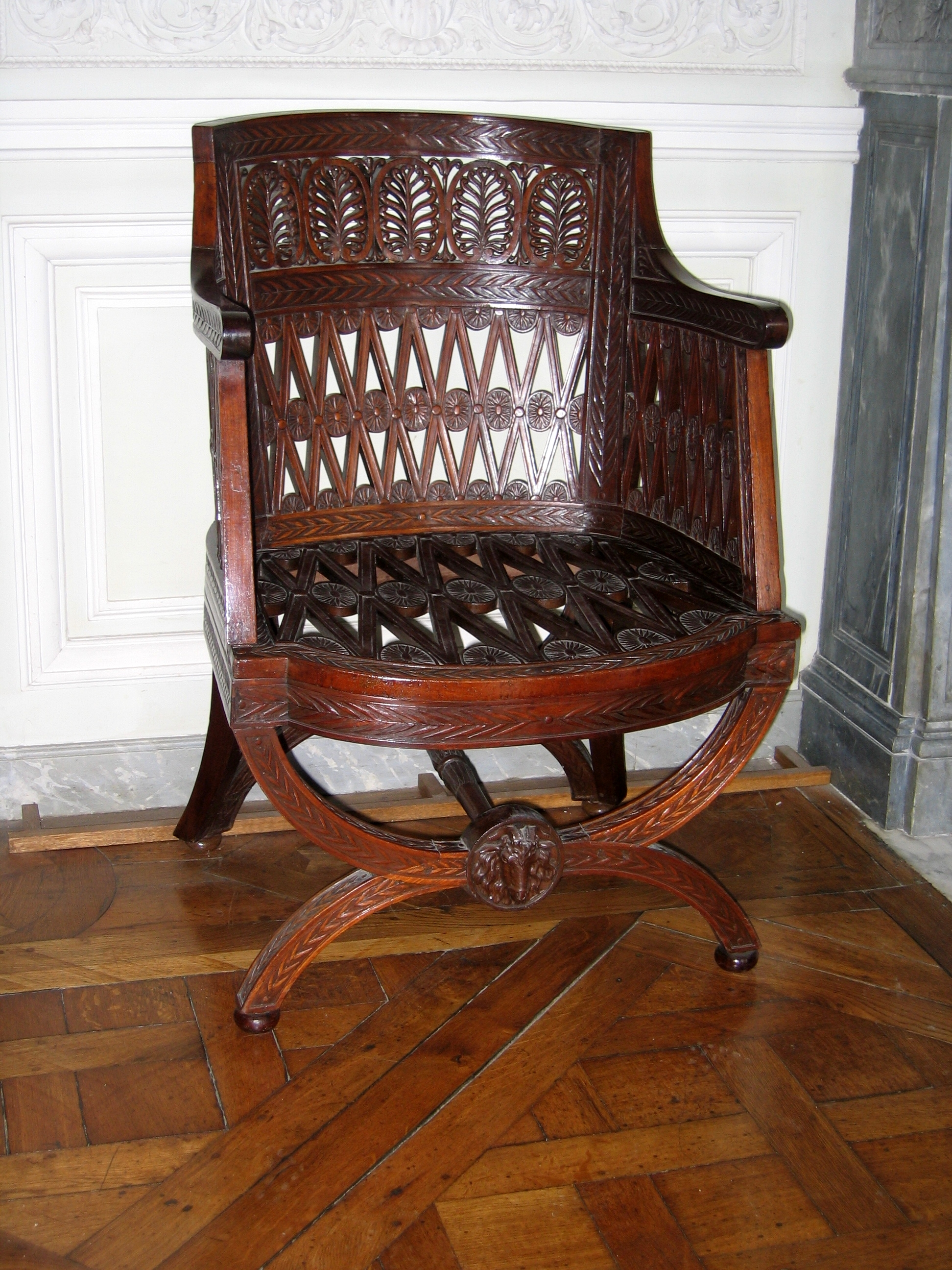
"Etruscan" Chair by Georges Jacob (1787) at the Petit Trianon, Versailles

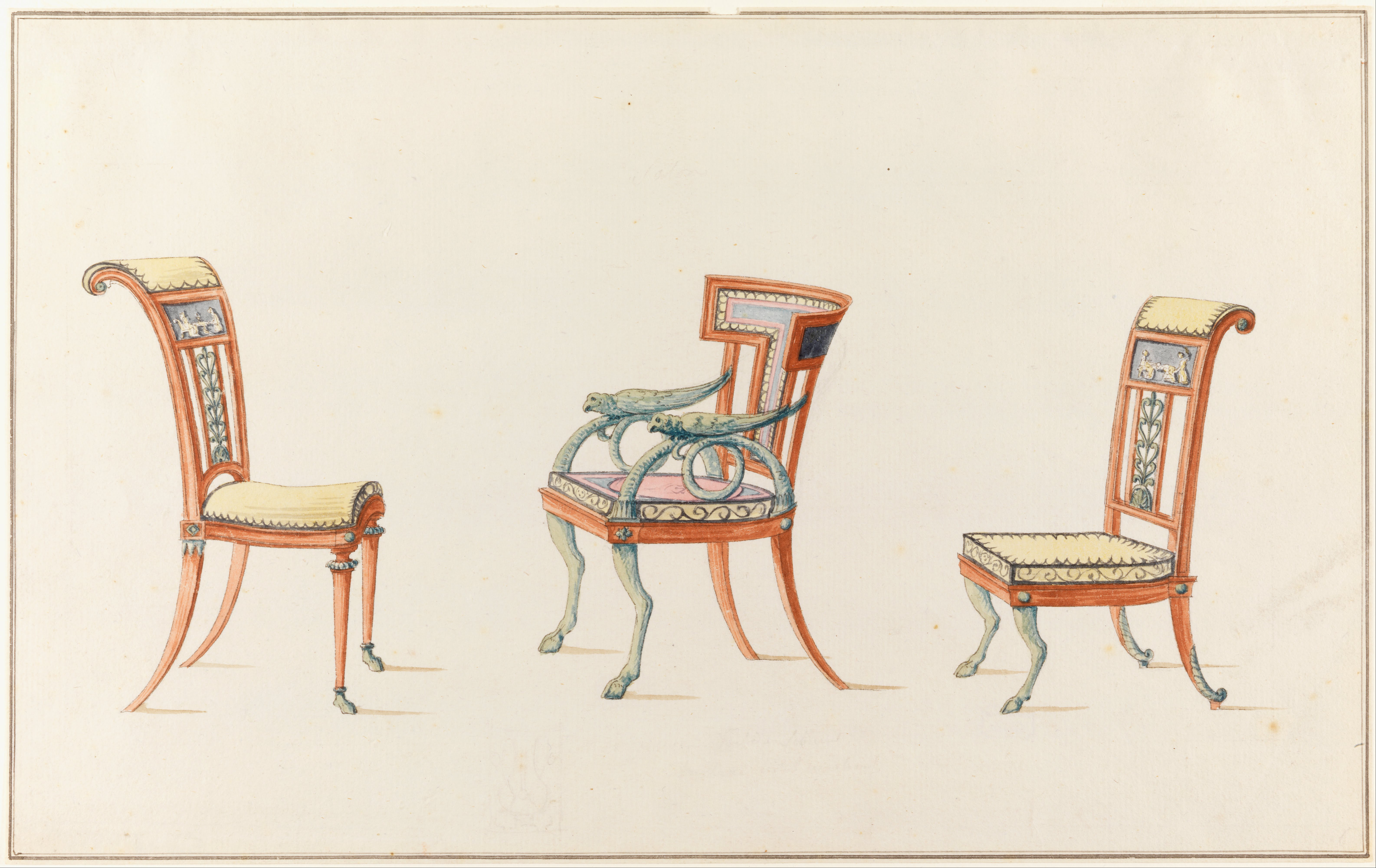
"Etruscan" chair designs by Henri Jacob, brother of Georges Jacob (1790)

== Tables ==
The console table, which had first appeared under Louis XV, was designed to be against or attached to the wall, and was often made by the same menuisiers who created the wooden wall panelling. It was decorated only on the front and sides. The top was made of marble or other stone, and was either rectangular of half-moon shaped. It usual had four feet, joined an X-shaped or H-shaped brace for stability. The central point of the brace under the console often had a pedestal, where pieces of fine porcelain could be displayed. Some smaller consoles had only a single foot, decorated with carved garlands of flowers.

Unlike the highly ornamented consoles of Louis XV furniture, with twisting rocaille sculpture, Louis XVI consoles, particularly in the late years, had an elegant simplicity. They included small varieties, such as the Console-Desserte, half-moon shaped, with a white marble and a simple wooden platform below supporting the legs, it was made of oak and mahogany, with slender tapering straight legs, with small drawers, discreet gilded bronze ornament, and a delicate ring of gilded bronze around the top. Other small consoles featured discreet marquetry of ebony, rosewood, tinted beech, and ash wood.

A variety of smaller, more portable tables, also appeared, made either by menuisiers of sculpted wood or by ébénistes with inlaid marquetry of exotic woods and materials. These included tables for playing cards, tables for writing, and tables de toilette, or dressing tables, which were usually of a simple form covered with fabric with embroidered designs or with lace.

During the late reign of Louis XVI, between 1780 and 1790, the British custom of having a round dining room table permanently positioned in the center of a dining room, gradually took hold in France. These tables often had casters on the legs, so they could be moved more easily, and had an extra two legs in the center, so additional sections could be added to enlarge the table.

Another type of table adapted from the British model was the guéridon, a small round table on a single column, with a base of three legs, often with small wheels or roulettes. The German-born ebeniste David Roentgen made a small oval table with drawers that folded out in around 1780, It was crafted of oak, rosewood, sycamore, boxwood and ebony, ornamented with guilder bronze and extremely fine marquetry in delicate floral patterns made of different colored woods. There were also tables for the popular salon game of Trictrac, as well as small writing tables, which sometimes had surfaces decorated with marquetry images of envelopes, pens, and books.

Another new type of small table was the Bonheur-du-jour, usually used as a dressing table. It had long legs, a semi-circular parquet platform, a drawer, and several small compartments and drawers on top. An oval shelf supported the legs. and oval tray supporting the legs.

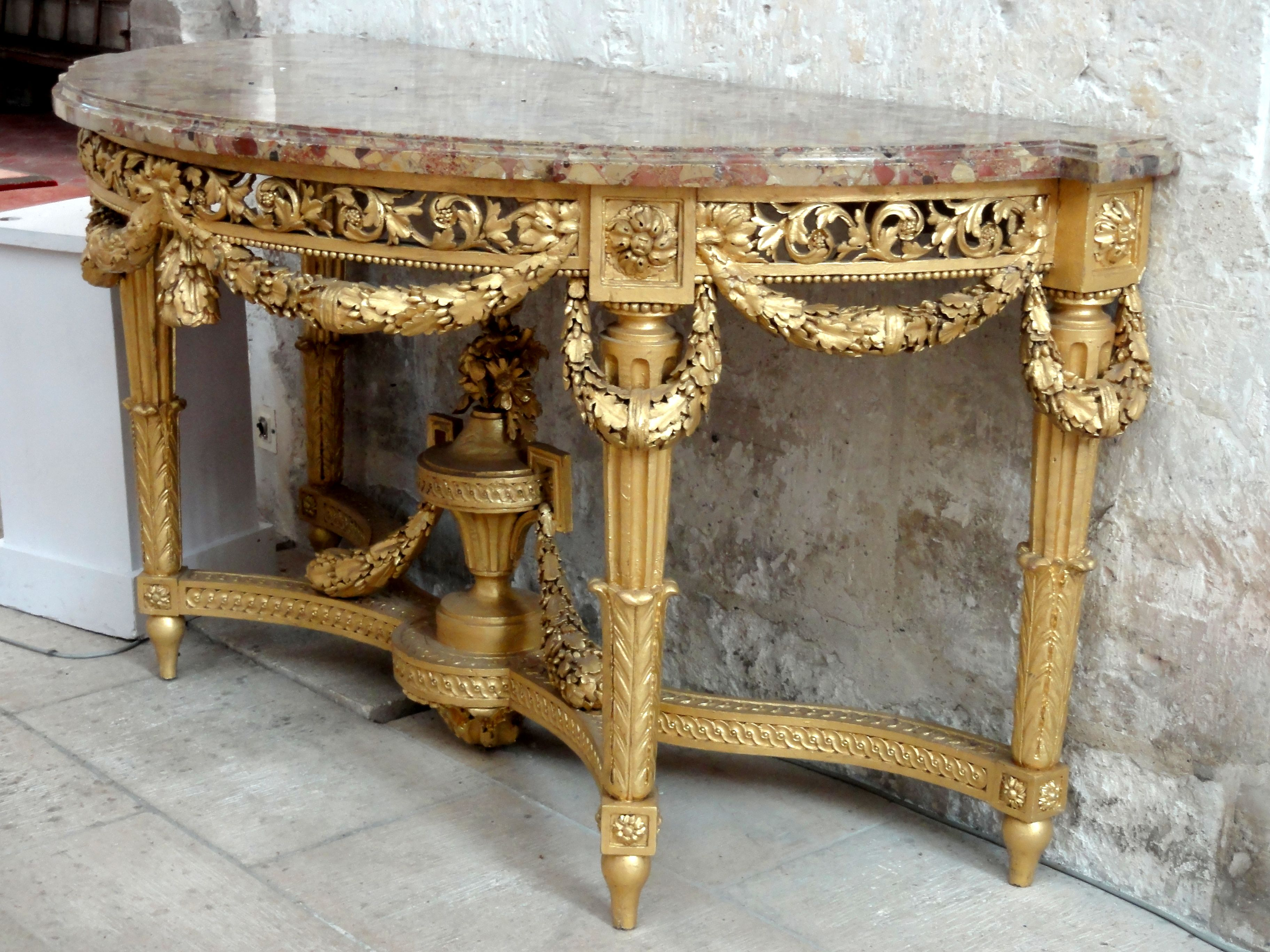
Console table

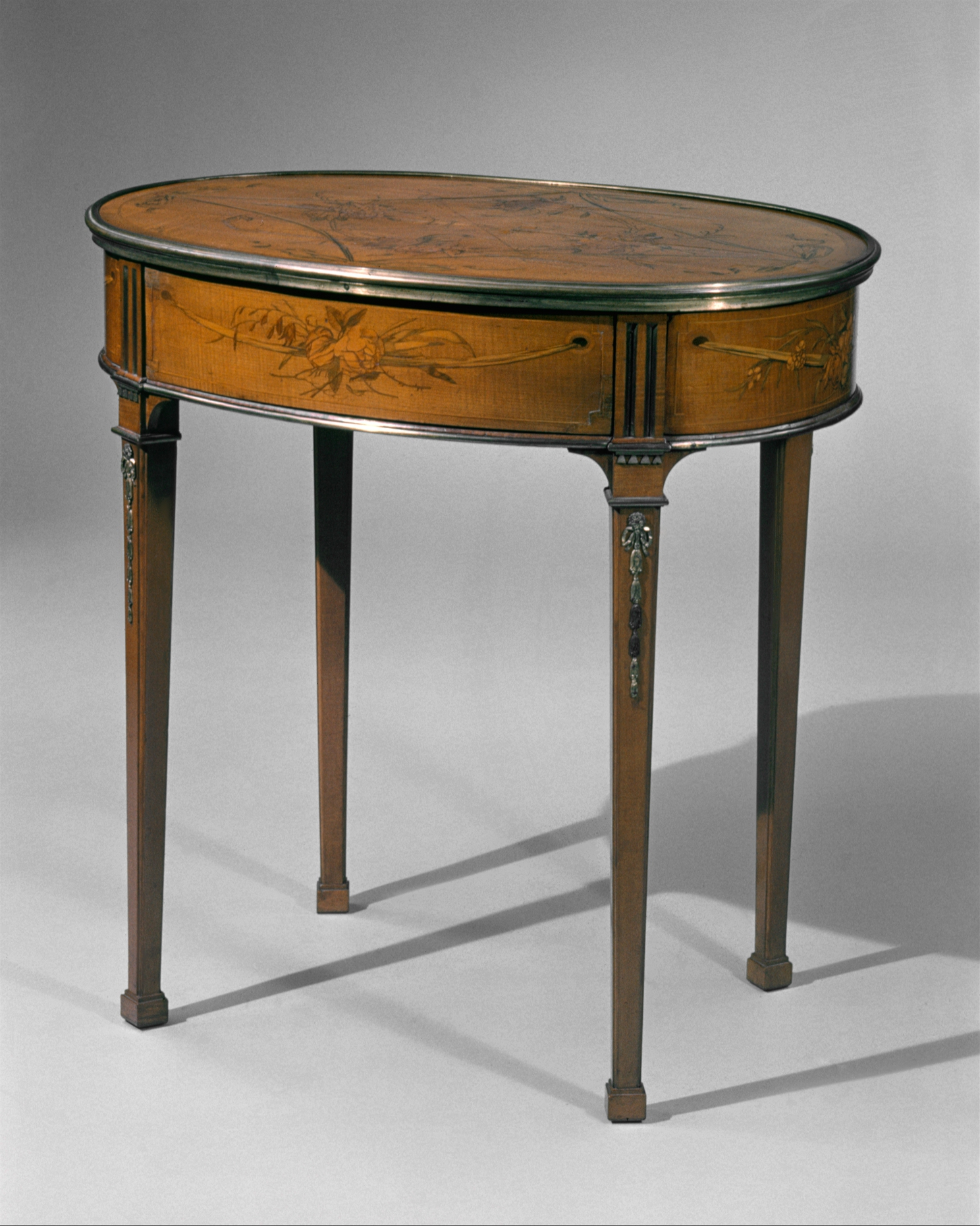
Oval table by David Roentgen (1774–80) Metropolitan Museum

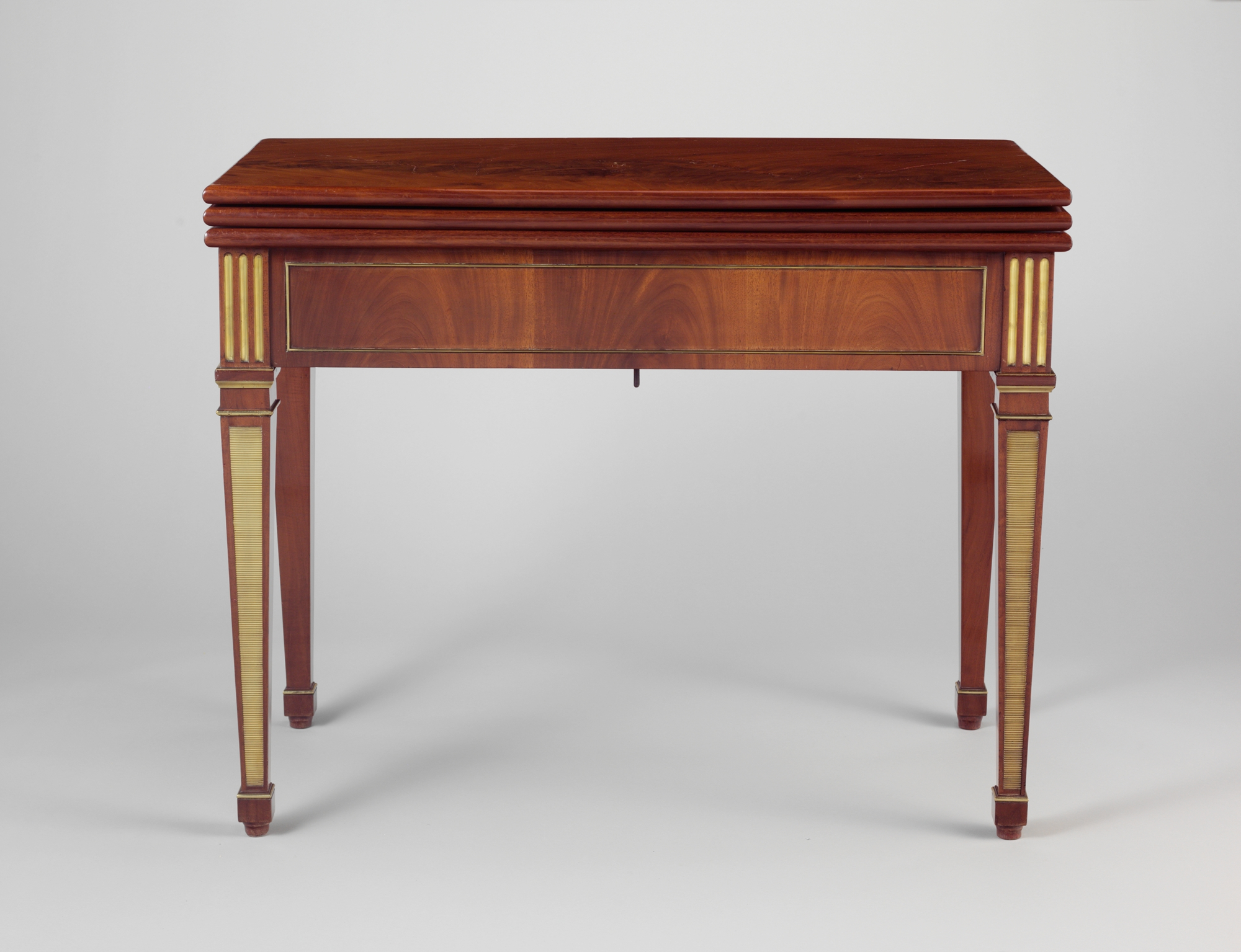
Game table by David Roentgen (1780–83) Metropolitan Museum

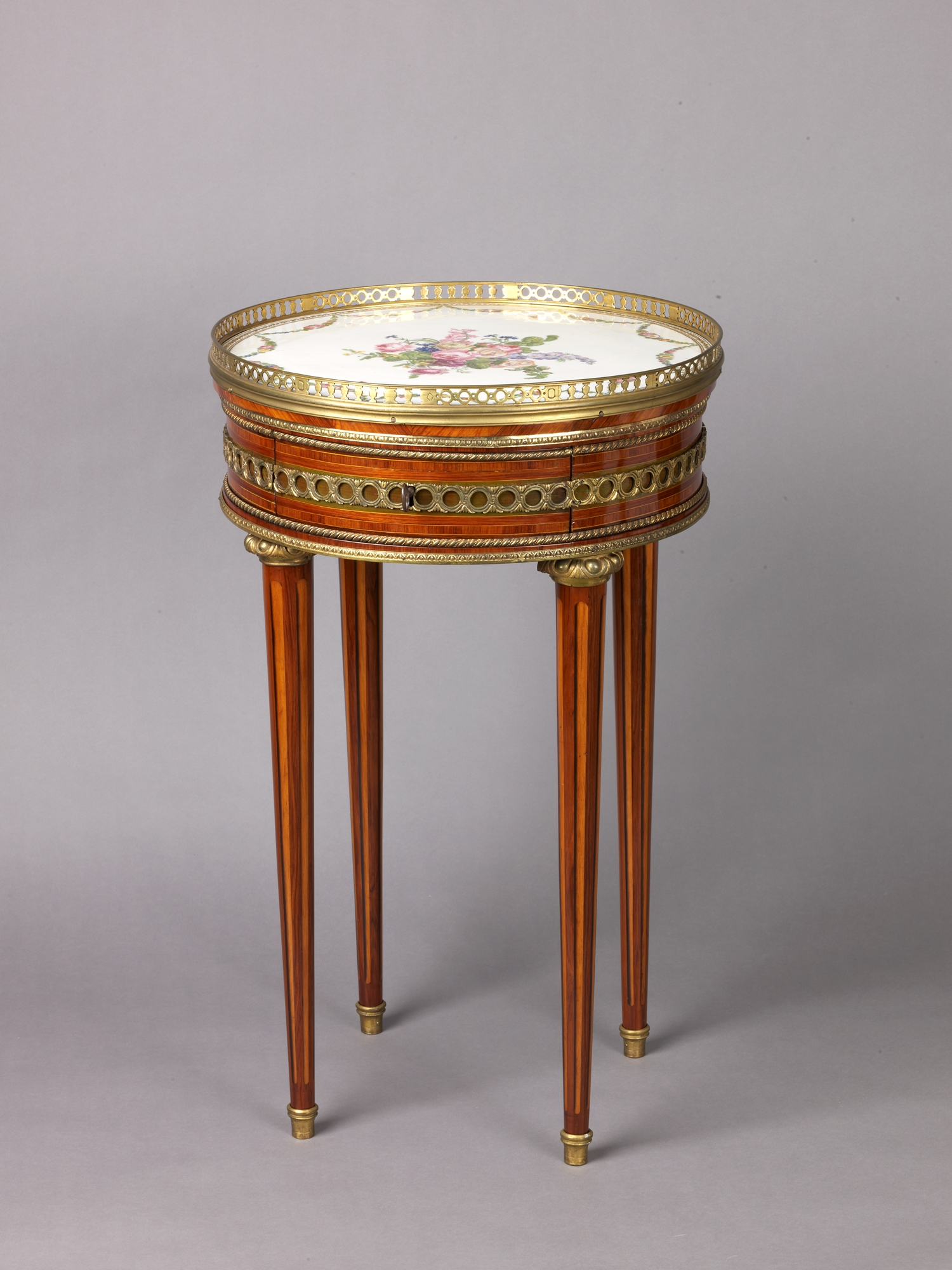
Round table with Sevres porcelain top (1774–91), Metropolitan Museum

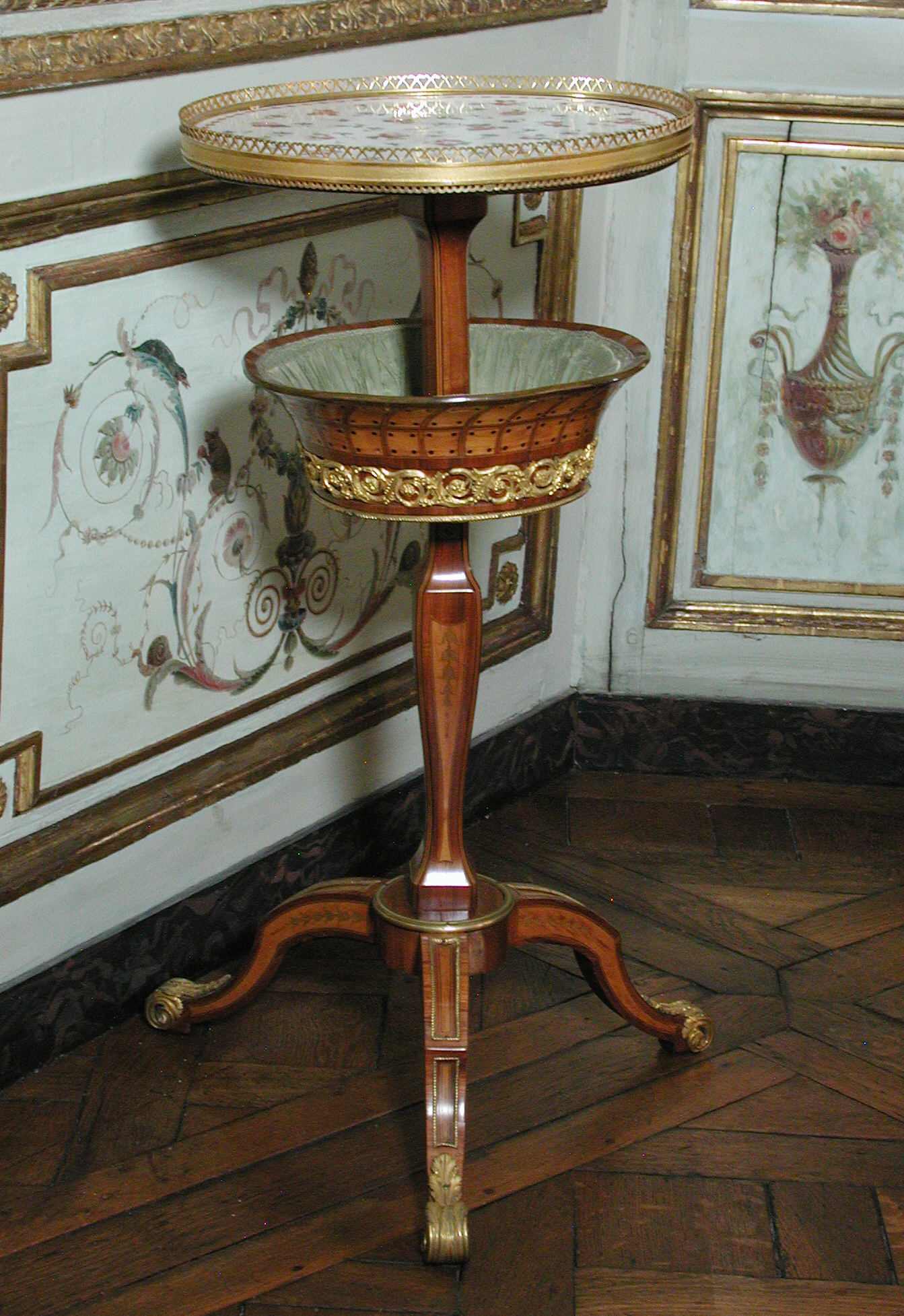
Gueridon Table (circa 1785) Metropolitan Museum

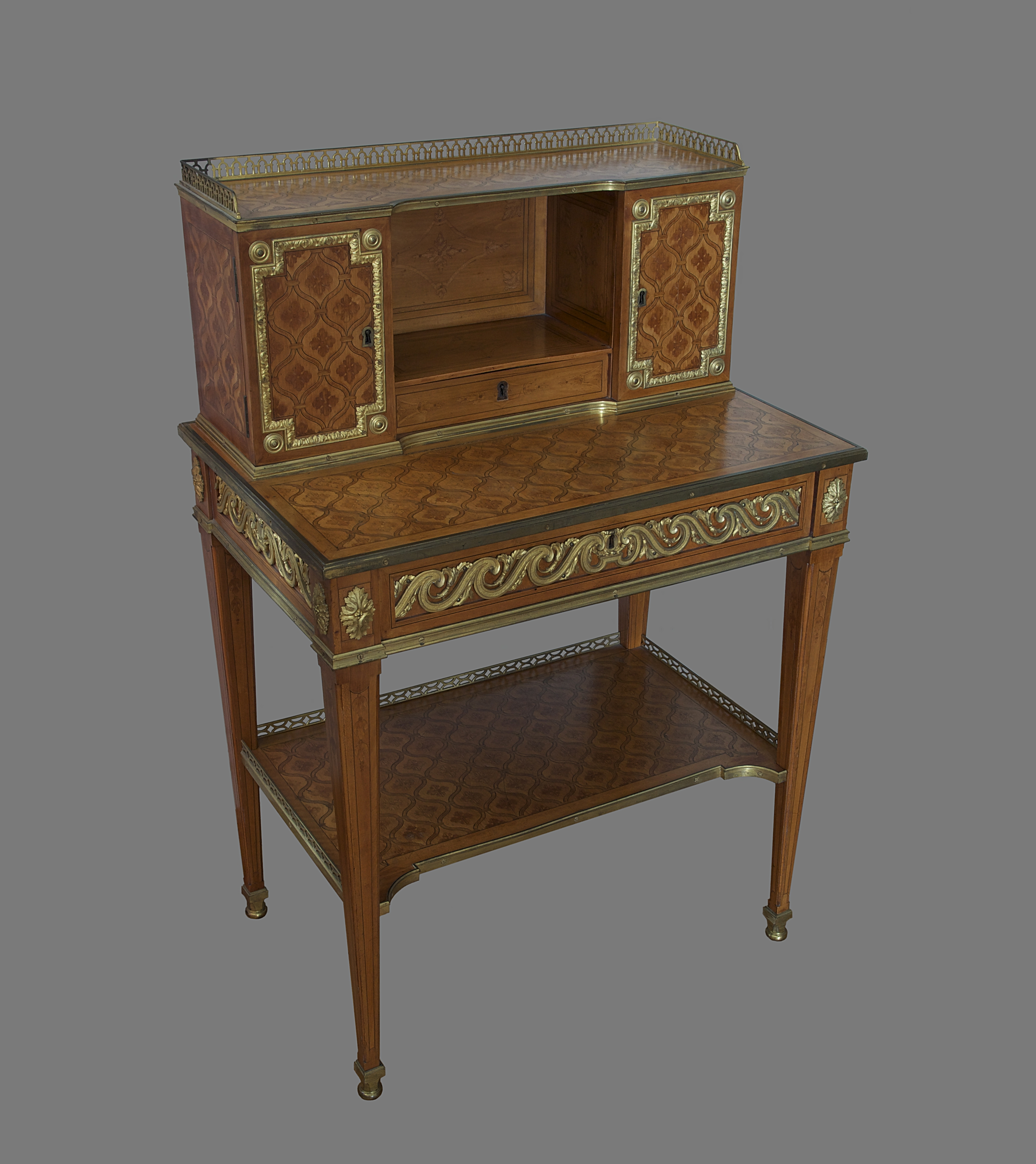
Bonheur-du-Jour attributed to Jean-Henri Riesener, Palace of Versailles

== Commodes and cabinets ==
The commode was the grand showcase of the marquetry skills of the ébénistes. A new form of commode appeared, called a la greque, which was cubic in form, with very short gilded bronze feet, and a face covered with inlaid decoration in geometric patterns of rosewood, amaranth, boxwood, and ebony, sometimes in a pattern of cubes, or a checkerboard, or the batons romp or broken stick pattern. Neoclassic themes appeared especially in the gilded bronze decoration; it commonly featured gilded bronze masks of Apollo or Mercury, gilded bronze drawer handles in the form of garlands of leaves or drapery, and a frieze in a geometric pattern around the top. Another popular form late in the period was a chest decorated with plaques of Sevres porcelain, usually with floral patterns. These were a specialty of the designer Martin Carlin. A more exotic material appeared in a cabinet for medals made for Louis XVI in 1788. The drawers were decorated with gilding and with real feathers and insect wings waxed and applied to the surface.

The marquetry decoration of commodes usually featured trophies or designs representing of love or music, flowers, and sometimes, in the passion for exotic themes, Chinese or Japanese objects. They began to have panels attached which were varnished to appear like Japanese lacquer.

The meuble d'appui was a type of commode with doors on the front, which, like commodes, had a marble top and a highly decorated face, and was designed to display decorative objects, either porcelain or candlesticks or clocks. Some variations had a central cupboard with a door, and shelves on either side for displaying vases or other objects. The commodes at the end of the reign often had friezes of stylized palm leaves abad other vegetal designs.

Later in the reign, a new variant was the commode a vantaux, where the drawers or shelves inside the cabinet were concealed with two doors. The ébéniste Jean-François Leleu went even further and designed a commode with no legs, which was simply placed on a wooden base, the version that became common in the 19th century. Later commodes often took a half-moon form, and had less decoration and ornament; their beauty came from the quality of the mahogany employed for the facing.

Some other specialized cabinets appeared under Louis XVI, thanks to the improved technology for making larger panes of glass. These included bibliotheques or bookcases with glass doors, and Vitrines, or cabinets with glass doors, where precious objects could be displayed. These had very ornate marquetry patterns on the doors in the earlier years of the reign, but became much simpler, with mahogany and oak trimmed with gilded bronze, in the later years.

At the very end of the reign of Louis XVI, even after the Revolution had begun in 1789, the Japanese influence was popular. Adam Weisweiler made commodes with Chinese and Japanese decoration made with oak and ebony, coated with Japanese lacquer and varnished, and richly decorated with gilded bronze. These pieces were often used to display imported vases and other porcelain placed on top.

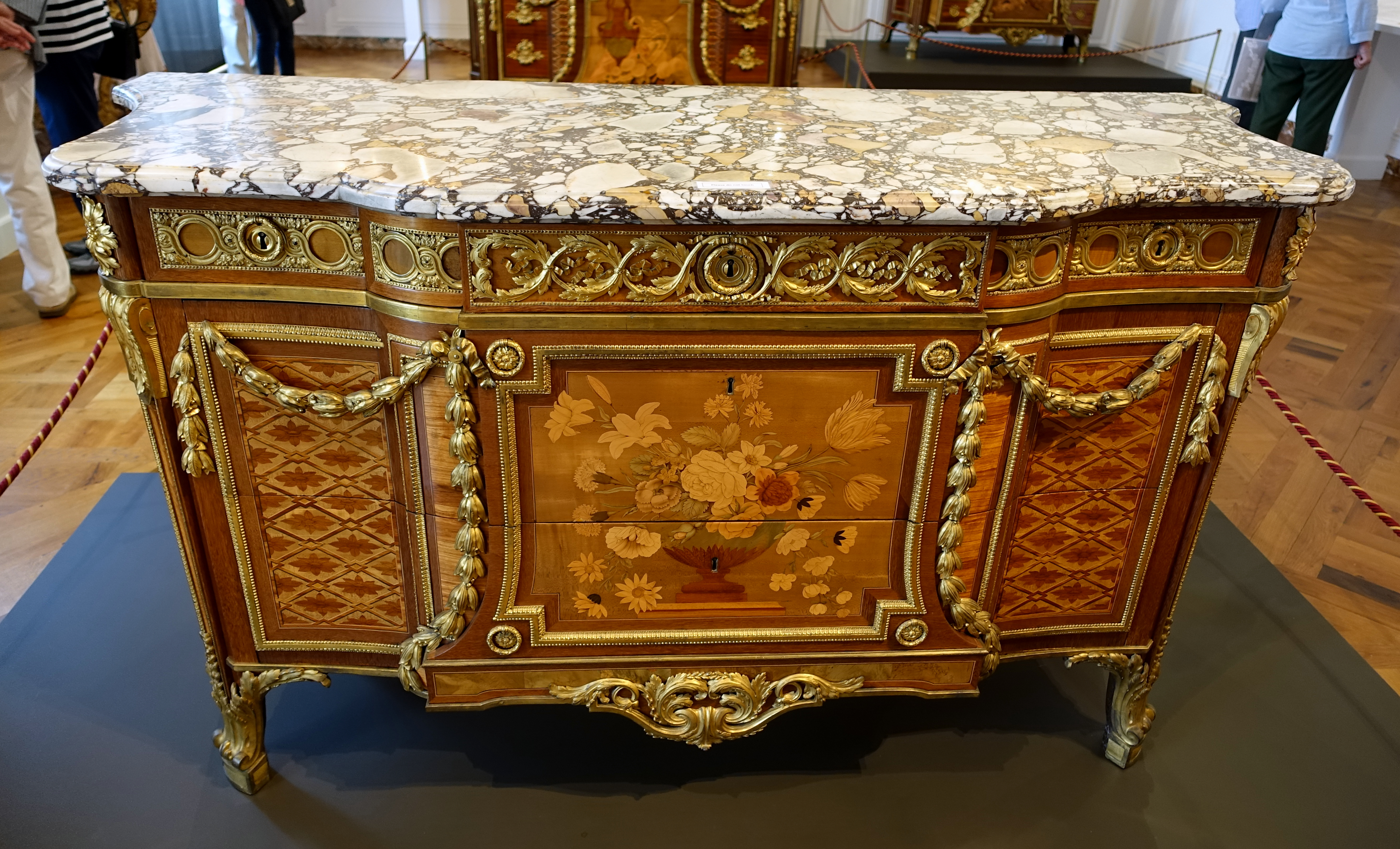
Early Commode by Jean-Henri Riesener for Comtesse de Provence (1776), Waddeston Manor, Buckinghamshire

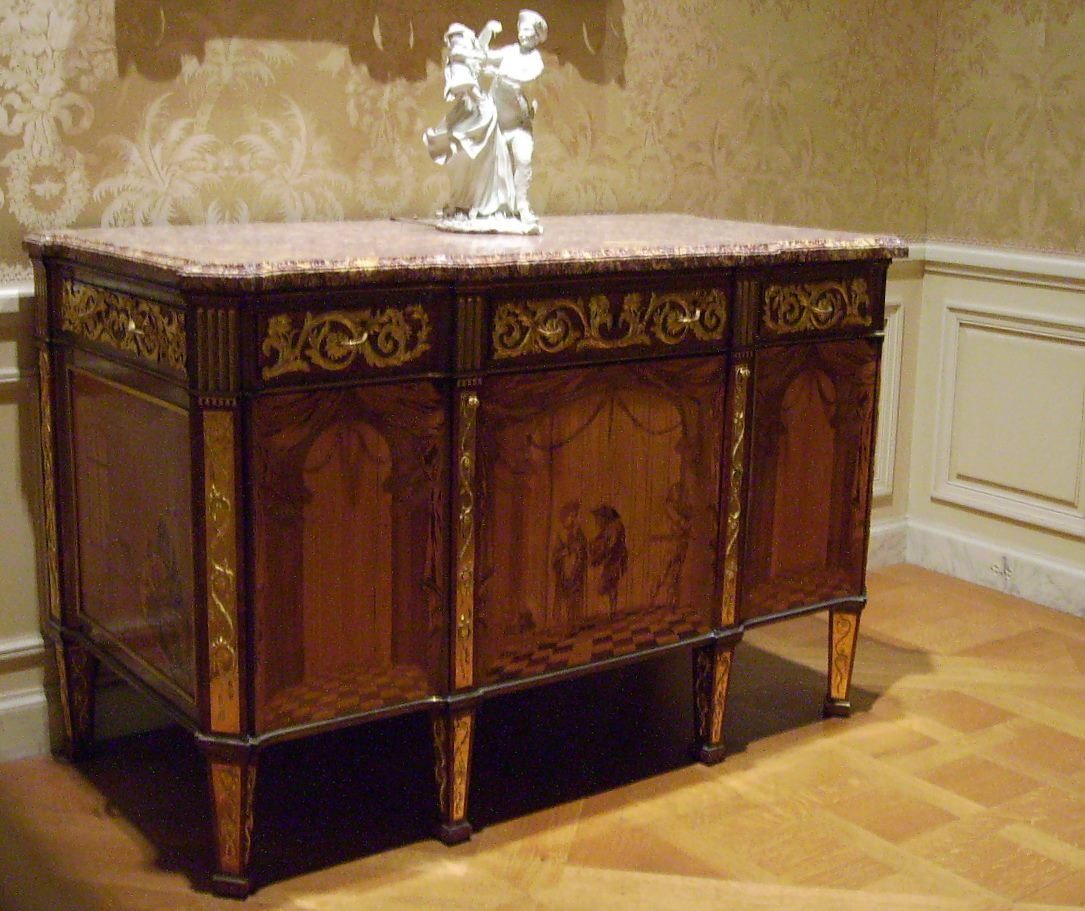
David Roentgen commode with a Chinese scene in marquetry

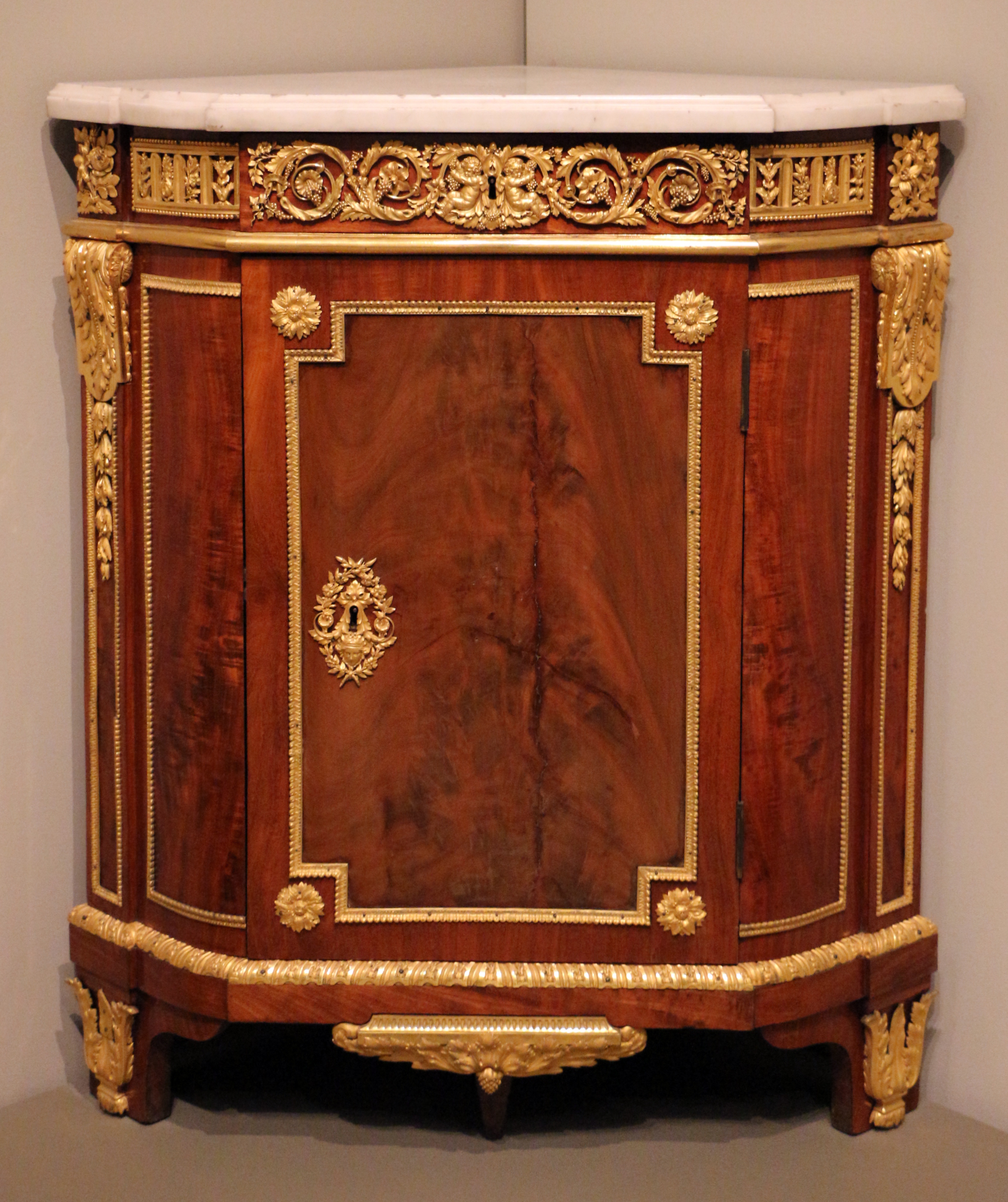
Commode by Jean-Henri Riesener (1785)

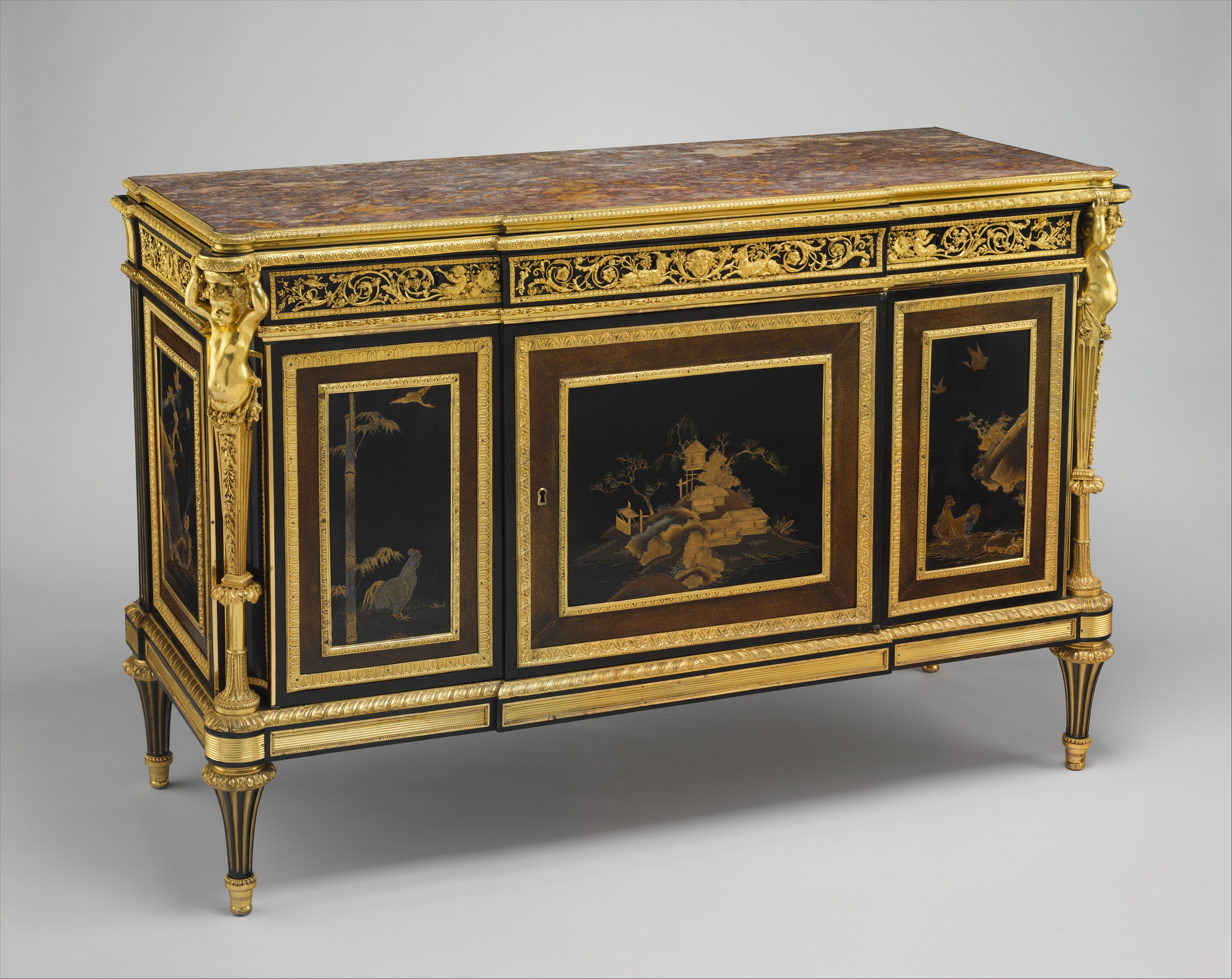
Commode by Adam Weisweiler (1790), Metropolitan Museum

== Desks ==
The basic forms of writing table, the drop-front desk and cylinder desk had all appeared in the furniture of Louis XV, but their appearance became more classical, geometric and sober under Louis XVI, and the quality marquetry inlays became much finer. The writing tables varied in size, but had leather tops, tapering legs, and usually three drawers. The corners were often decorated with gilded brass rosettes or other ornaments. The woods used were generally oak, rosewood and amaranth, sometimes with additional mahogany, boxwood and ebony inlays. Some writing tables had additional shelves that could be pulled out for writing surfaces, and some models and a surface that would lift up at an angle. The bureau à cylinder, or roll top desk, had been invented by Oeben for Louis XV in 1760. The updated versions by Jean-Henri Riesener, were made of oak covered with mahogany, and had simple but elegant gilded bronze drawer handles, keyholes, and a lacy decorative trim fence around the top.

The Secretaire an armoire was a vertical piece of furniture which resembled an armoire. The writing surface was pulled down, and the shelves and drawers inside were revealed. The Secretaire en cabinet also had a writing surface that pulled down, with shelves on either side and drawers beneath. Clocks and other decorative objects could be placed on the marge shelf on top.

The designers who were most celebrated for desks included, besides Jean-Henri Riesener, Jean-Francois Leleu; Claude-Charles Saunier, and particularly David Roentgen, who made desks not only for Louis XVI, but also for Catherine the Great, the King of Prussia and the Emperor of Austria. His desks were famous for the mechanical mechanisms and secret compartments rather than their elegance.

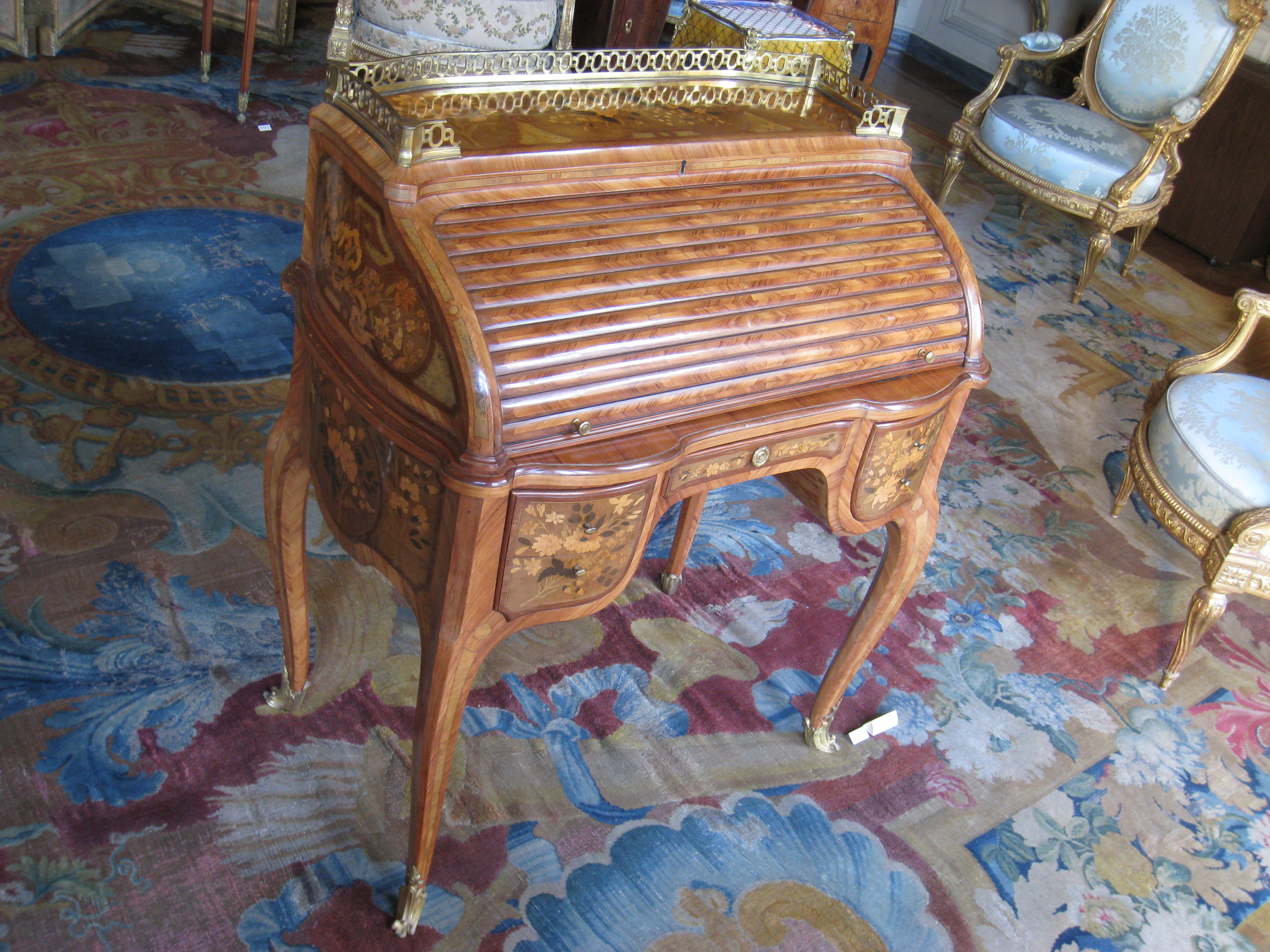
Rolltop desk by Jean-Henri Oeben (1775)

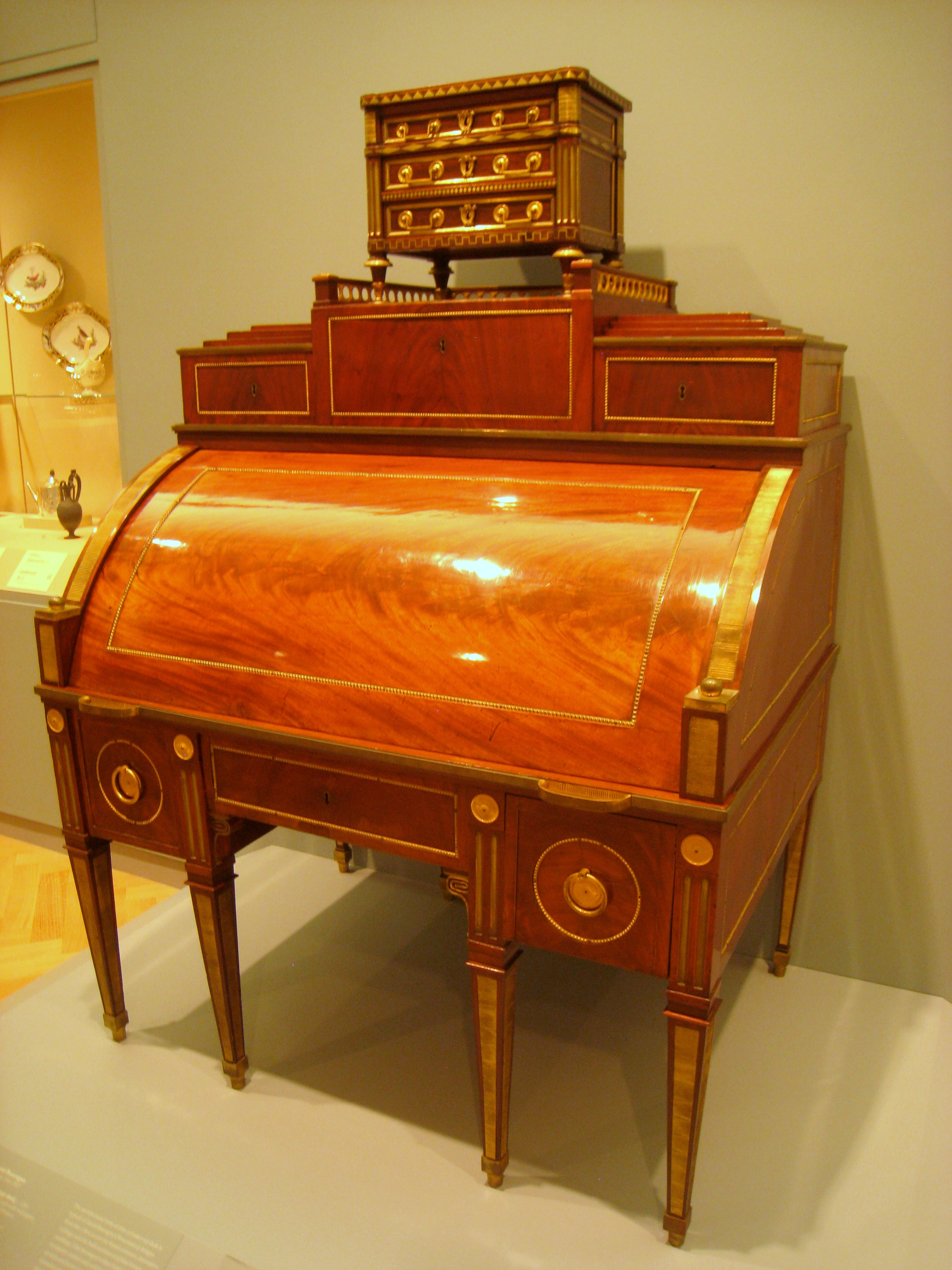
Rolltop desk by David Roentgen (1785), Carnegie Museum of Art, Pittsburg USA

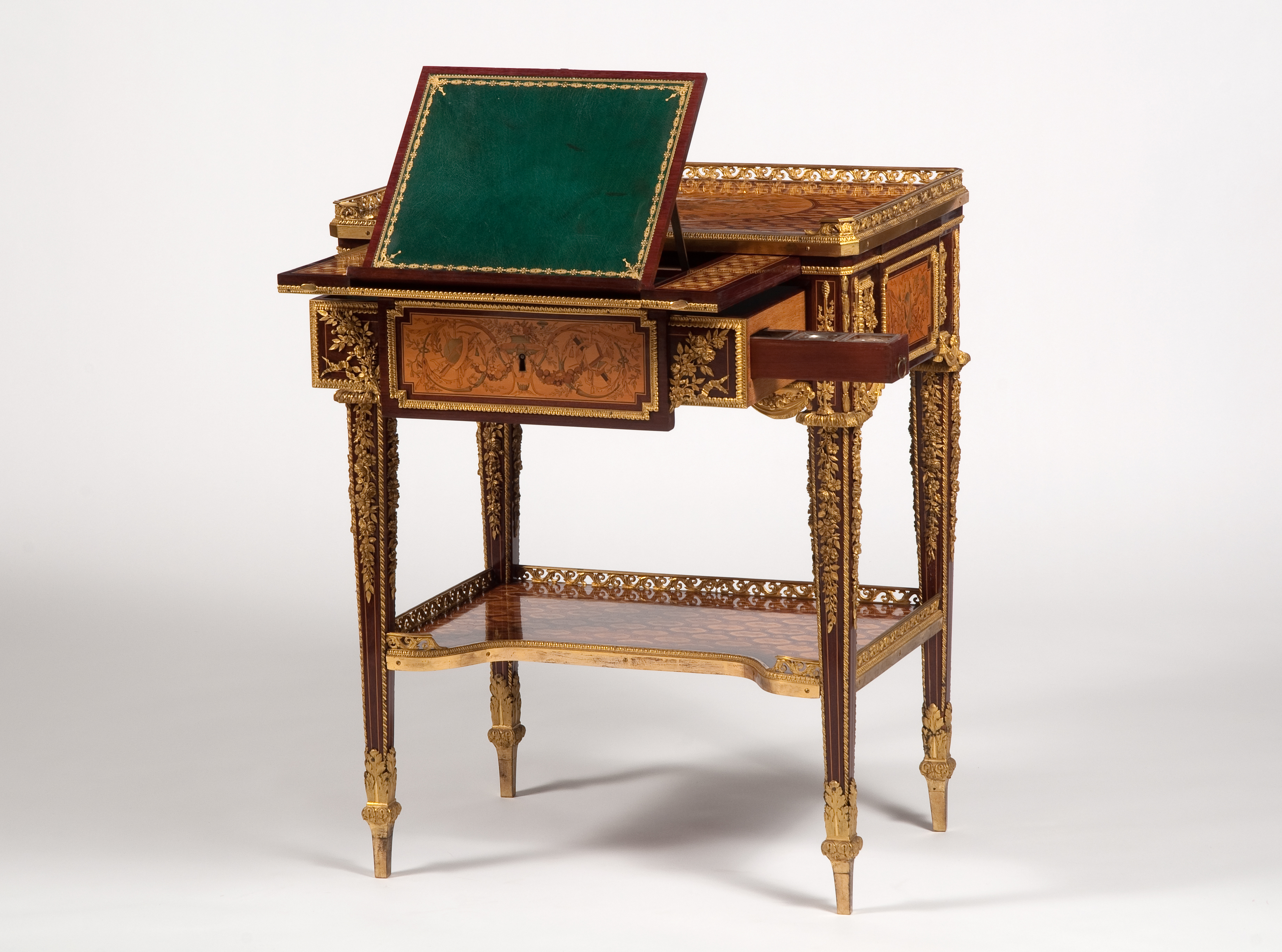
Writing table made by Jean-Henri Riesener for Marie Antoinette, (1780–85), Waddesdon Manor

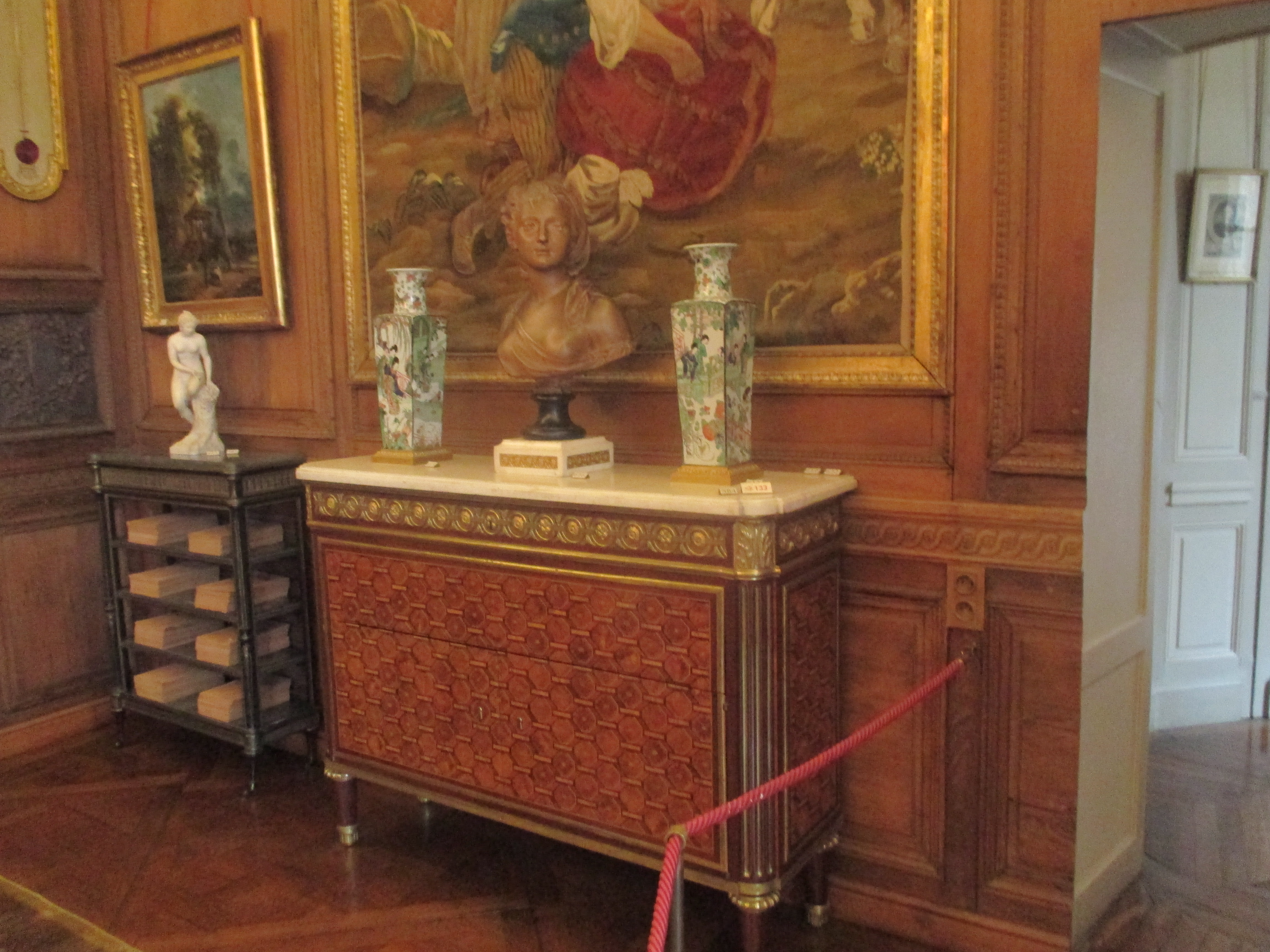
Drop-front desk by Jean-Francois Leleu Musee Nissim de Camondo, Paris

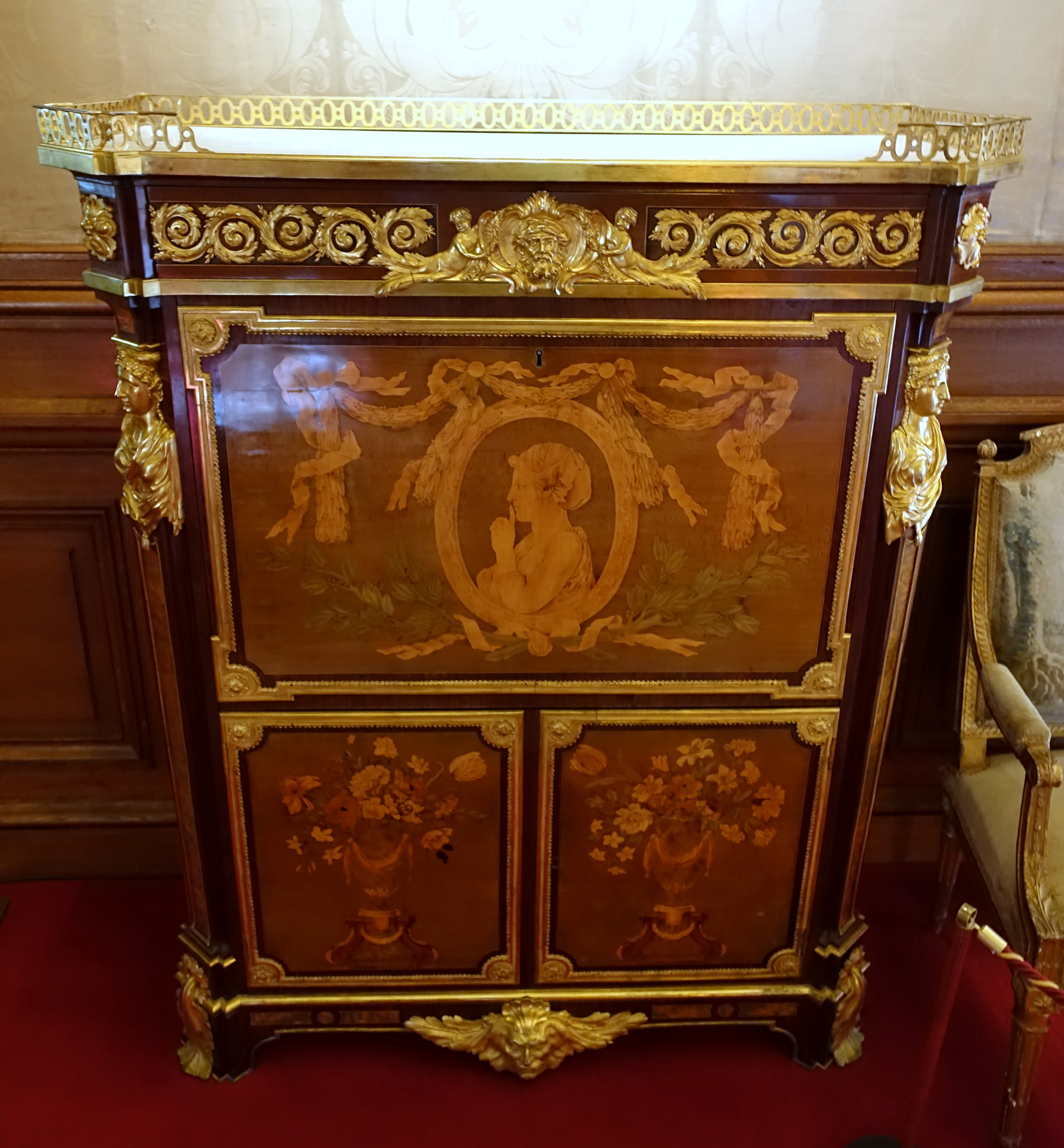
Drop-front desk by Jean-Henri Riesener Waddesdon Manor, England

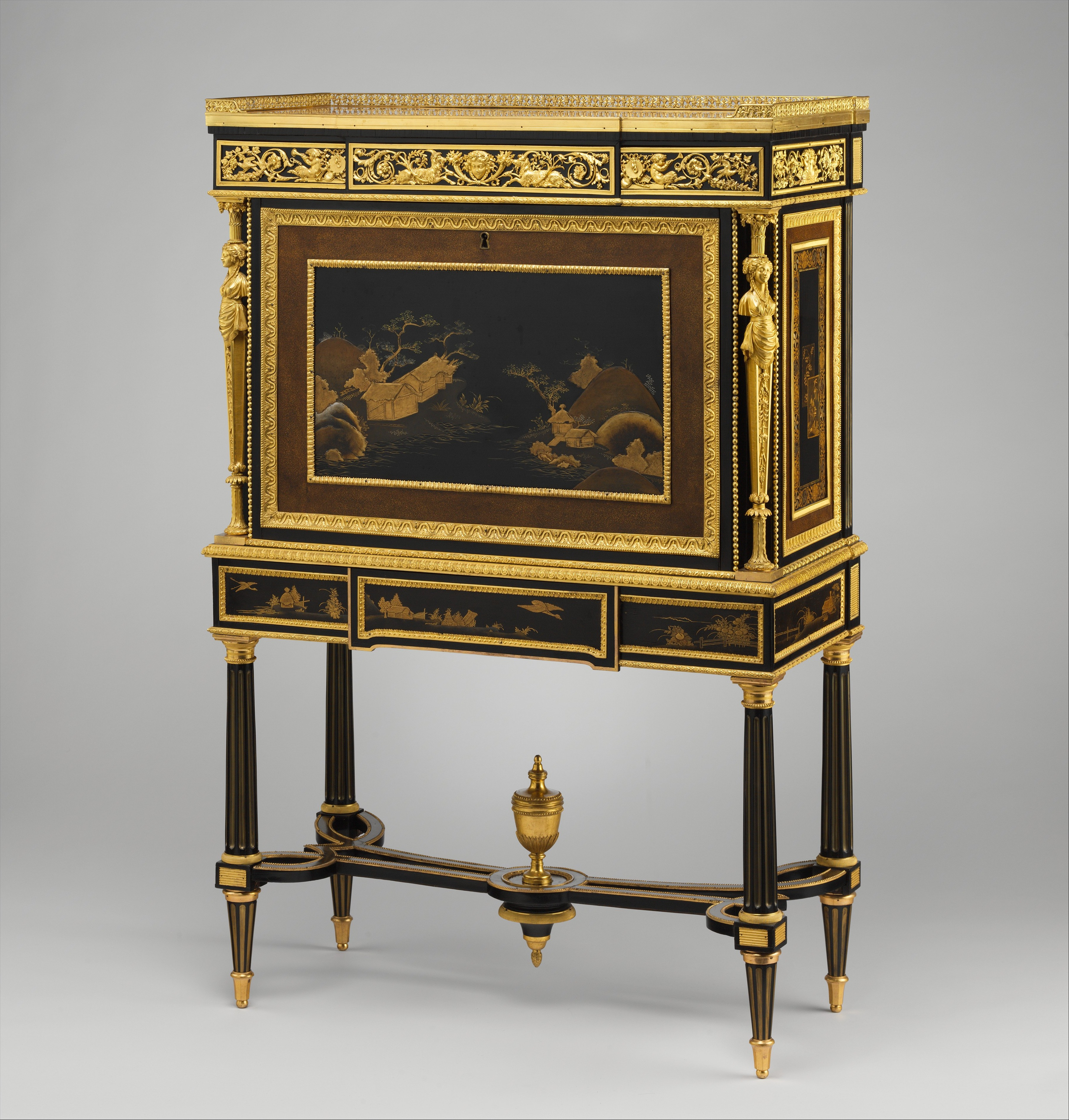
Drop-front desk by Adam Weisweiler, (c. 1790) Metropolitan Museum

== Beds ==
In the reign of Louis XVIII, nobles often received visitors while in bed. The official waking-up of the King was a formal ceremony, could be attended by anyone in the palace. and nobles often received visitors while they were in bed. In the bedchambers of the King and Queen, the bed was behind a balustrade, and a row of stools was placed behind the balustrade for guests.

The beds of the nobility and wealthy were usually square or rectangular, with four high posts supporting a canopy called the ciel, or sky. The ciel could either be fixed to the bedposts, or to the wall. Curtains were usually hung from the ciel and could be drawn to enclose the bed. In the 18th century different variants of the canopy appeared. In a bed a la Duchesse the canopy covered the entire bed, while in a bed a l'ange, or "like an angel", the canopy covered only the head of the bed. The head of the bed, with its ornate chevet or headboard, was usually placed against the wall.

Several other variants appeared in the 18th century, including the lit en chair à prêcher, which had a canopy attached to the wall by sloping poles, which resembled the pulpit attached to the wall of a church. A more casual variant, the lit de jour or day bed, was midway between a bed and a sofa, with an upholstered chevet or headboard at one end attached to a long cushion with six legs.

The Lit à la polonaise (Polish bed), with the ciel suspended directly over the bed, had first appeared under Louis XV, but was simplified and given a classical look under Louis XVI. Marie Antoinette had a version made for the bath of her apartments in Versailles.

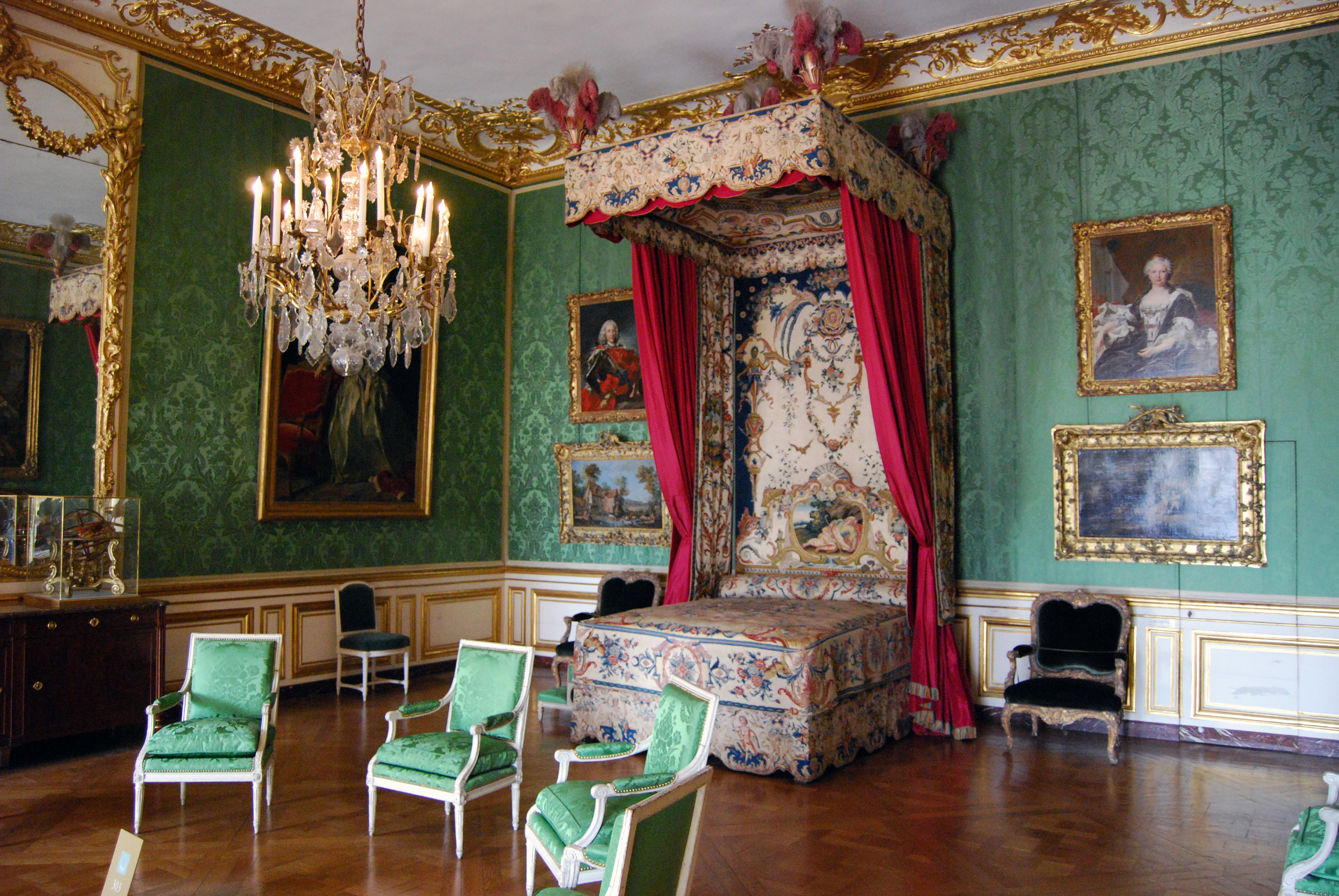
Bed of the Dauphin, Palace of Versailles

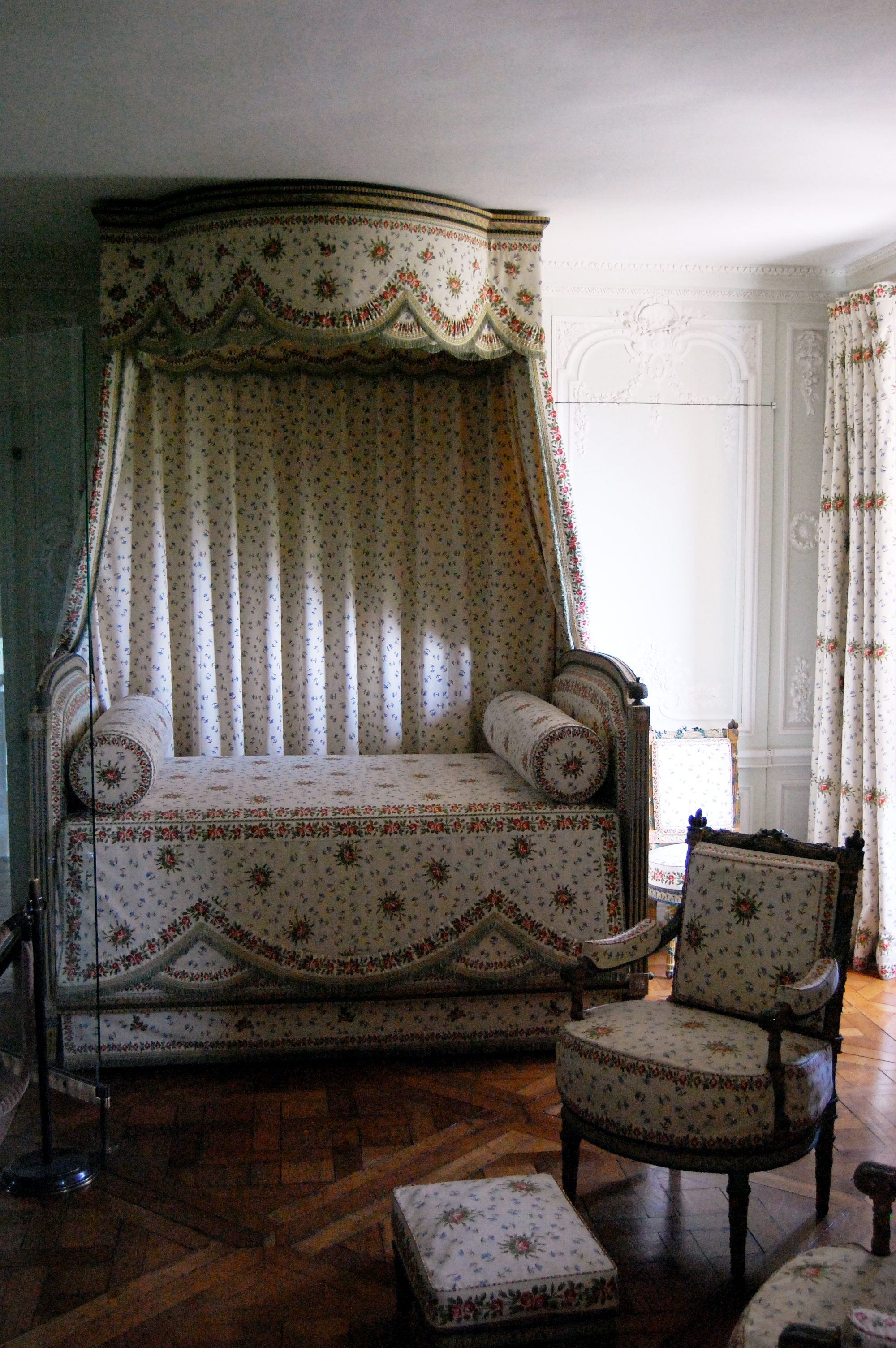
Bed of Marie-Antoinette at the Petit Trianon, Versailles, by Georges Jacob

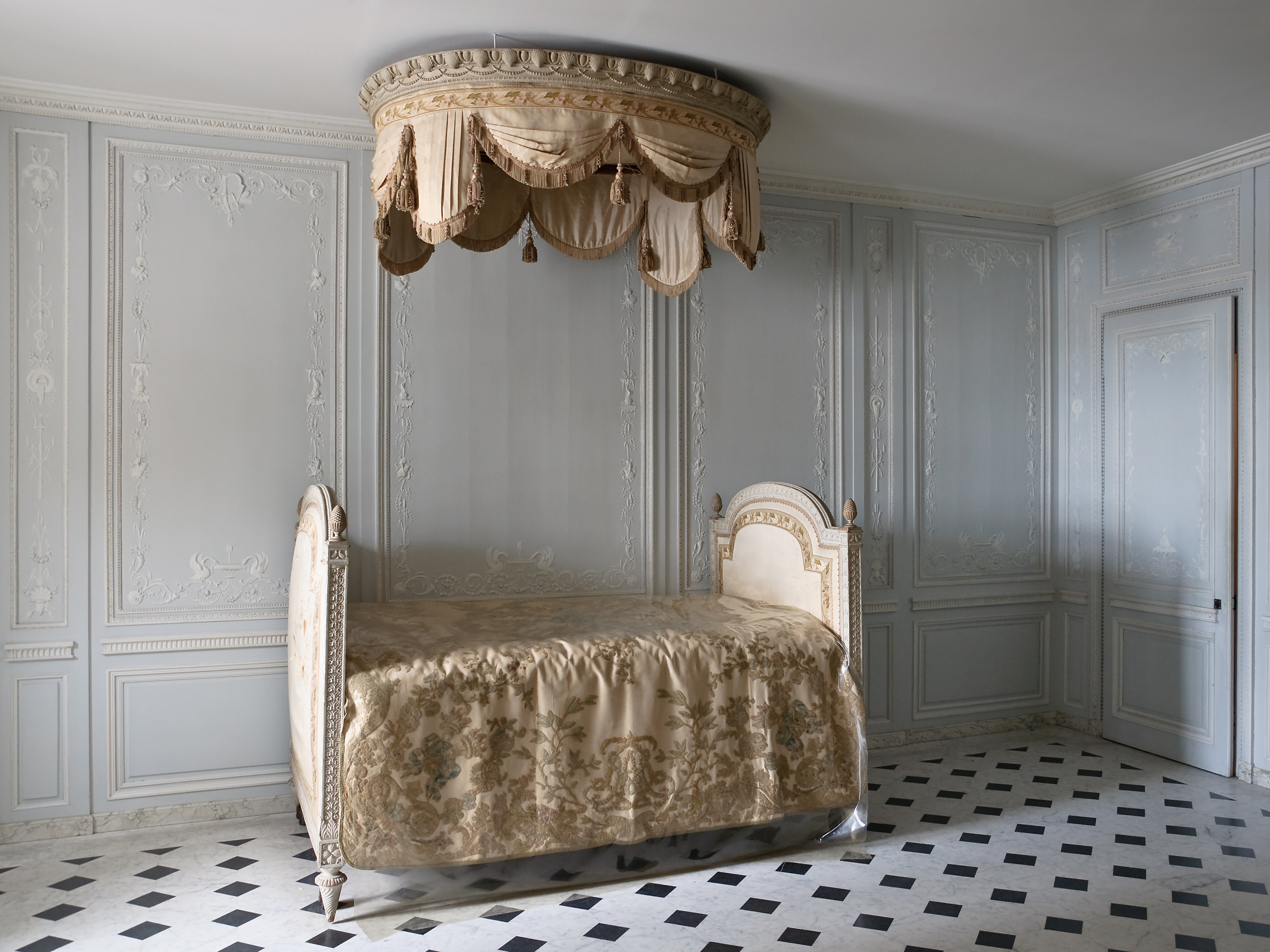
Lit à la polonaise (Polish-style bed), Salle de Bains, Versailles

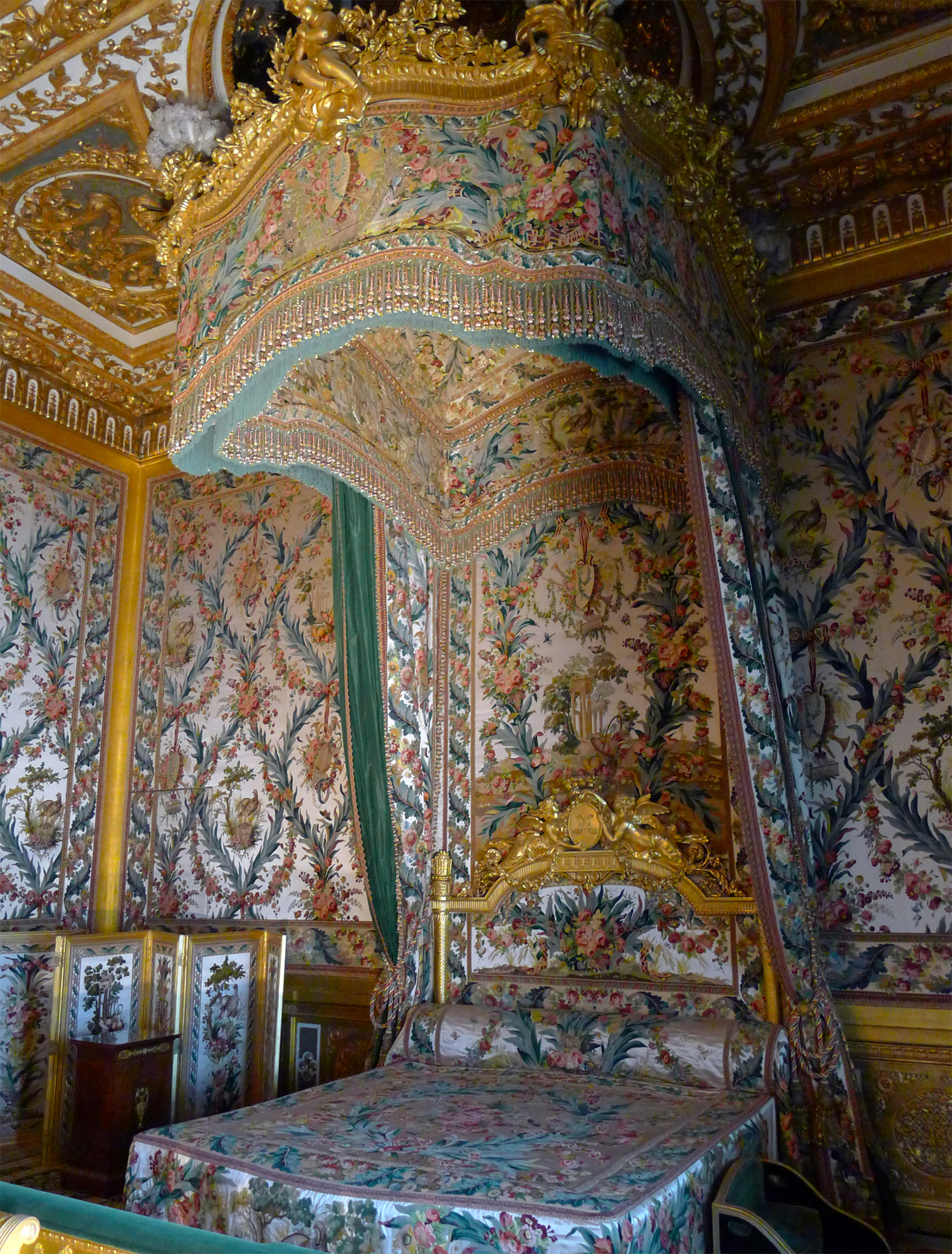
Bed of Marie Antoinette at Palace of Fontainebleau by Jean-Baptiste-Claude Sené (1787)

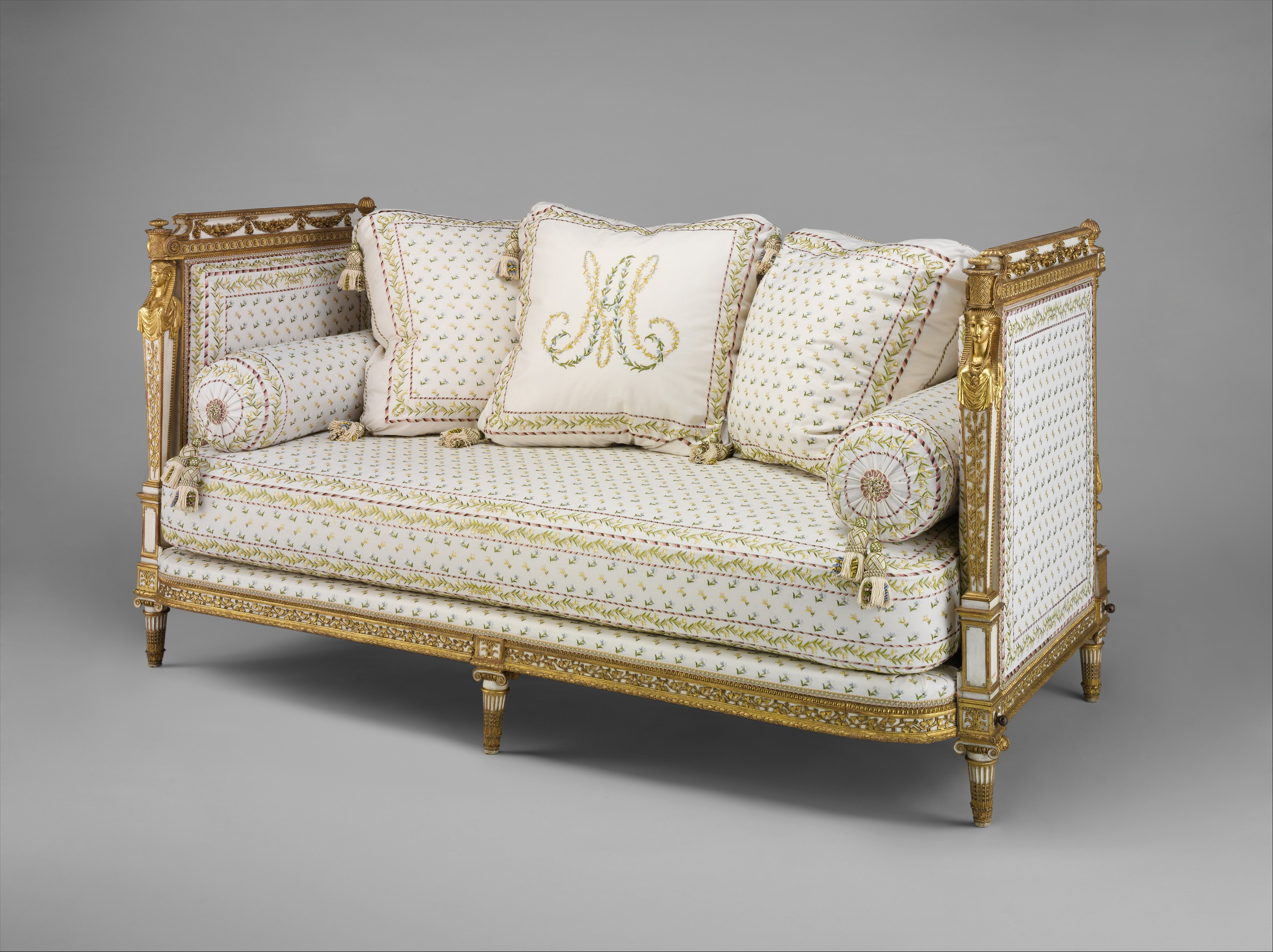
Daybed or Lit de Repos by Jean-Baptiste-Claude Sené (1788), Metropolitan Museum

== Notable designers and craftsmen ==
- Guillaume Beneman
- Martin Carlin
- Charles Delafosse
- Pierre Gouthière
- Georges Jacob
- Jean-François Leleu
- Jean-Henri Riesener
- David Roentgen
- Jean-Baptiste-Claude Sené
- Pierre-Philippe Thomire
- Adam Weisweiler

== See also ==
- Louis XVI style
- Louis XIV furniture
- Louis XV furniture
- Louis Quinze
- Neoclassicism in France

== Bibliography ==
- De Morant, Henry (1970). Histoire des arts décoratifs (in French). Librarie Hacahette.
- Ducher, Robert (1988), Caractéristique des Styles (in French), Paris: Flammarion, ISBN 2-08-011539-1
- Renault, Christophe (2006), Les Styles de l'architecture et du mobilier (in French), Paris: Gisserot, ISBN 978-2-877-4746-58
- Wiegandt, Claude-Paul (1995), Le Mobilier Français- Transition Louis XVI (in French), Paris: Massin, ISBN 2-7072-0281-9
- Lovreglio, Aurélia and Anne (2006), Dictionnaire des Mobiliers et des Objets d'art du Moyen Âge au XXIe siècle (in French), Paris: Le Robert, ISBN 2-84902-079-6
