= Empire style =

19th-century Neoclassical art movement

- The Arc de Triomphe of the Place de l'Étoile, one of the most famous examples of Empire architecture, commissioned in 1806 after the victory at Austerlitz by Emperor Napoleon I
- Years active: 1799–1815
- Location: French Consulate; First French Empire
- Major figures: Pierre-François-Léonard Fontaine; Charles Percier
- Influences: Consulate style; Directoire style
- Influenced: Biedermeier; Egyptian Revival; Greek Revival; Late-Federal; Regency

The Empire style (French: style Empire [stil ɑ̃piʁ]) is an early–19th-century design movement in architecture, furniture, other decorative arts, and the visual arts, representing the second phase of Neoclassicism. It flourished between 1799 and 1815 during the Consulate and the First French Empire periods, although its life span lasted until the late-1820s. From France it spread into much of Europe and the United States.

The Empire style originated in and takes its name from the rule of the Emperor Napoleon I in the First French Empire, when it was intended to idealize Napoleon's leadership and the French state. The previous fashionable style in France had been the Directoire style, a more austere and minimalist form of Neoclassicism that replaced the Louis XVI style, and the new Empire style brought a full return to ostentatious richness. The style corresponds somewhat to the Biedermeier style in the German-speaking lands, Federal style in the United States, and the Regency style in Britain.

== History ==
The Directoire style of the immediately preceding period aimed at a simpler, but still elegant evocation of the virtues of the ancient Roman Republic:

The stoic virtues of Republican Rome were upheld as standards not merely for the arts but also for political behaviour and private morality. Conventionels saw themselves as antique heroes. Children were named after Brutus, Solon and Lycurgus. The festivals of the Revolution were staged by David as antique rituals. Even the chairs in which the committee of Salut Publique sat were made on antique models devised by David. ...In fact Neo-classicism became fashionable.

Before the development of the Empire style there was a brief transitional Consulate style that formed under the Consulate. This style introduced many of the motifs of Empire style, taking inspiration from military campaigns, including the French campaign in Egypt and Syria, and was more formal and rectangular.

The Empire style "turned to the florid opulence of Imperial Rome. The abstemious severity of Doric was replaced by Corinthian richness and splendour".

Two French architects, Percier and Fontaine, were together the creators of the French Empire style. The two had studied in Rome and in the 1790s became leading furniture designers in Paris, where they received many commissions from Napoleon and other statesmen.

Architecture of the Empire style was based on elements of the Roman Empire and its many archaeological treasures, which had been rediscovered starting in the eighteenth century. The preceding Louis XVI and Directoire styles employed straighter, simpler designs compared to the Rococo style of the eighteenth century. Empire designs strongly influenced the contemporary American Federal style (such as design of the United States Capitol building), and both were forms of propaganda through architecture. It was a style of the people, not ostentatious but sober and evenly balanced. The style was considered to have "liberated" and "enlightened" architecture just as the propaganda that Napoleon had "liberated" the peoples of Europe with his Napoleonic Code.

The Empire period was popularized by the inventive designs of Percier and Fontaine, Napoleon's architects for Malmaison. The designs drew for inspiration on symbols and ornaments borrowed from the glorious ancient Greek and Roman empires. Buildings typically had simple timber frames and box-like constructions, veneered in expensive mahogany imported from the colonies. Biedermeier furniture also used ebony details, originally due to financial constraints. Ormolu details (gilded bronze furniture mounts and embellishments) displayed a high level of craftsmanship.

General Bernadotte, later to become King Karl Johan of Sweden and Norway, introduced the Napoleonic style to Sweden, where it became known under his own name. The Karl Johan style remained popular in Scandinavia even as the Empire style disappeared from other parts of Europe. France paid some of its debts to Sweden in ormolu bronzes instead of money, leading to a vogue for crystal chandeliers with bronze from France and crystal from Sweden.

After Napoleon lost power, the Empire style continued to be in favour for many decades, with minor adaptations. There was a revival of the style in the last half of the nineteenth century in France, again at the beginning of the twentieth century, and again in the 1980s.

The style survived in Italy longer than in most of Europe, partly because of its Imperial Roman associations, partly because it was revived as a national style of architecture following the unification of Italy in 1870. Mario Praz wrote about this style as the Italian Empire. In the United Kingdom, Germany, and the United States, the Empire style was adapted to local conditions and gradually acquired further expression as the Egyptian Revival, Greek Revival, Biedermeier style, Regency style, and late-Federal style.

The more bombastic type of Stalinist architecture is sometimes referred to as Stalin's, or Stalinist, Empire style, which the Soviet Union exported to the wider Soviet bloc - for the most prominent examples see here.

== Motifs and ornaments ==
All Empire ornament is governed by a rigorous spirit of symmetry reminiscent of the Louis XIV style. Generally, the motifs on a piece's right and left sides correspond to one another in every detail; when they do not, the individual motifs themselves are entirely symmetrical in composition: antique heads with identical tresses falling onto each shoulder, frontal figures of Victory with symmetrically arrayed tunics, identical rosettes or swans flanking a lock plate, etc. Like Louis XIV, Napoleon had a set of emblems unmistakably associated with his rule, most notably the eagle, the bee, stars, and the initials I (for Imperator) and N (for Napoleon), which were usually inscribed within an imperial laurel crown. Motifs used include: figures of Nike bearing palm branches, Greek dancers, nude and draped women, figures of antique chariots, winged putti, mascarons of Apollo, Hermes and the Gorgon, swans, lions, the heads of oxen, horses and wild beasts, butterflies, claws, winged chimeras, sphinxes, bucrania, sea horses, oak wreaths knotted by thin trailing ribbons, climbing grape vines, poppy rinceaux, rosettes, palm branches, and laurel. There's a lot of Greco-Roman ones: stiff and flat acanthus leaves, palmettes, cornucopias, beads, amphoras, tripods, imbricated disks, caduceuses of Mercury, vases, helmets, burning torches, winged trumpet players, and ancient musical instruments (tubas, rattles and especially lyres). Despite their antique derivation, the fluting and triglyphs so prevalent under Louis XVI are abandoned. Egyptian Revival motifs are especially common at the beginning of the period: scarabs, lotus capitals, winged disks, obelisks, pyramids, figures wearing nemeses, caryatids en gaine supported by bare feet and with women Egyptian headdresses.

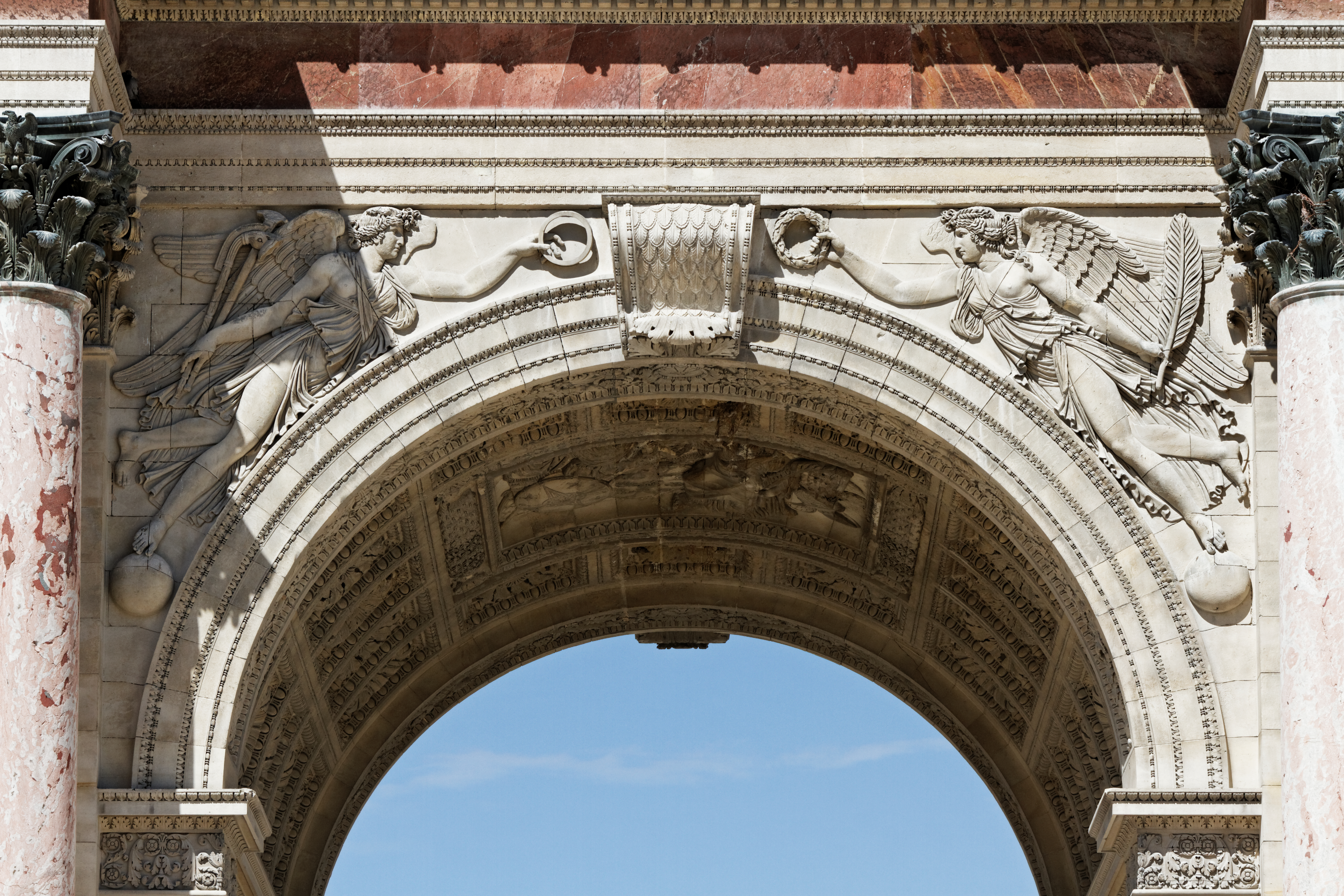
Detail of Arc de Triomphe du Carrousel from Paris, with a pair of winged Victories

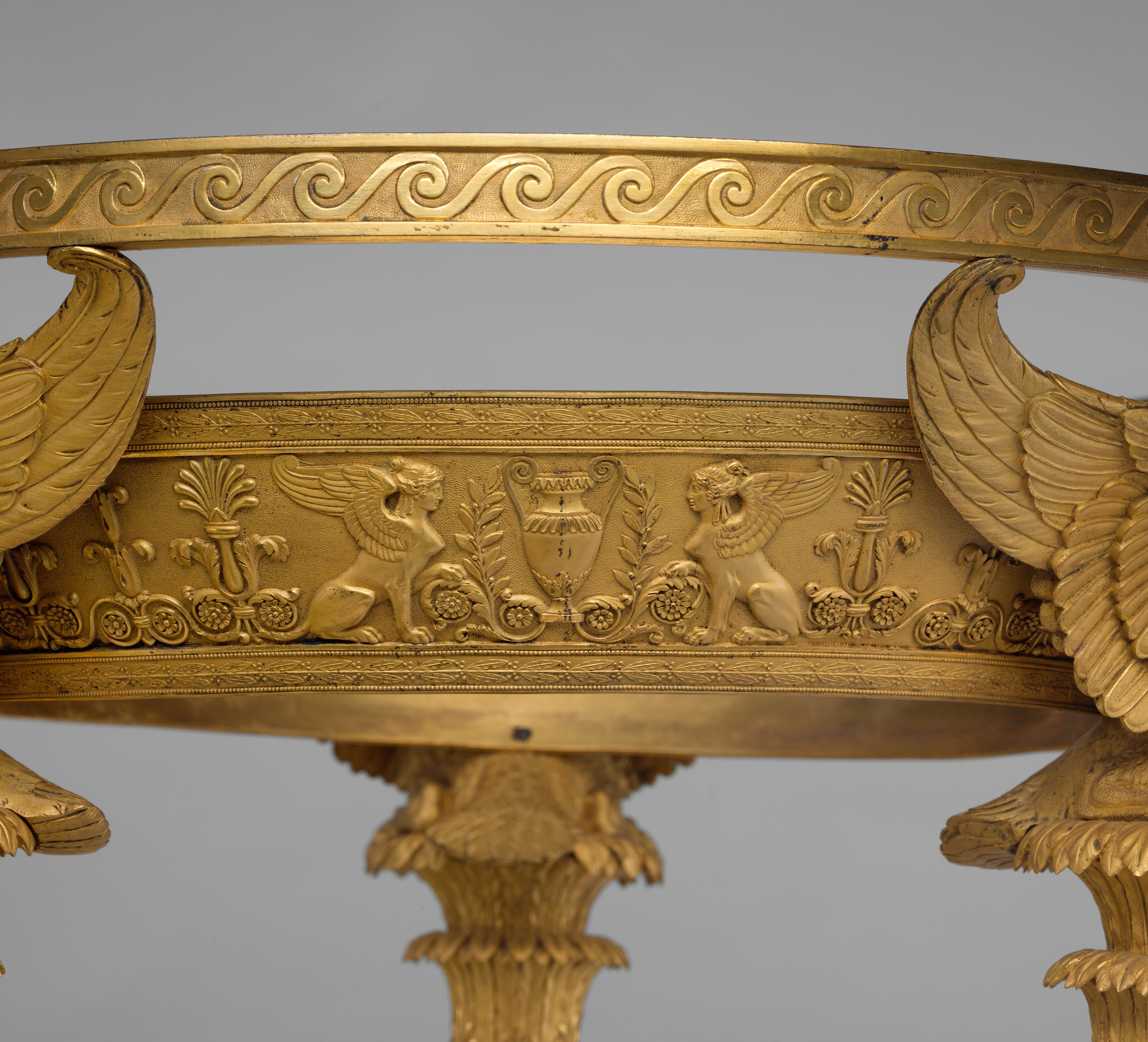
A pair of sphinxes with an amphora between them, surrounded by rinceaux and palmettes, on a washstand (athénienne or lavabo)

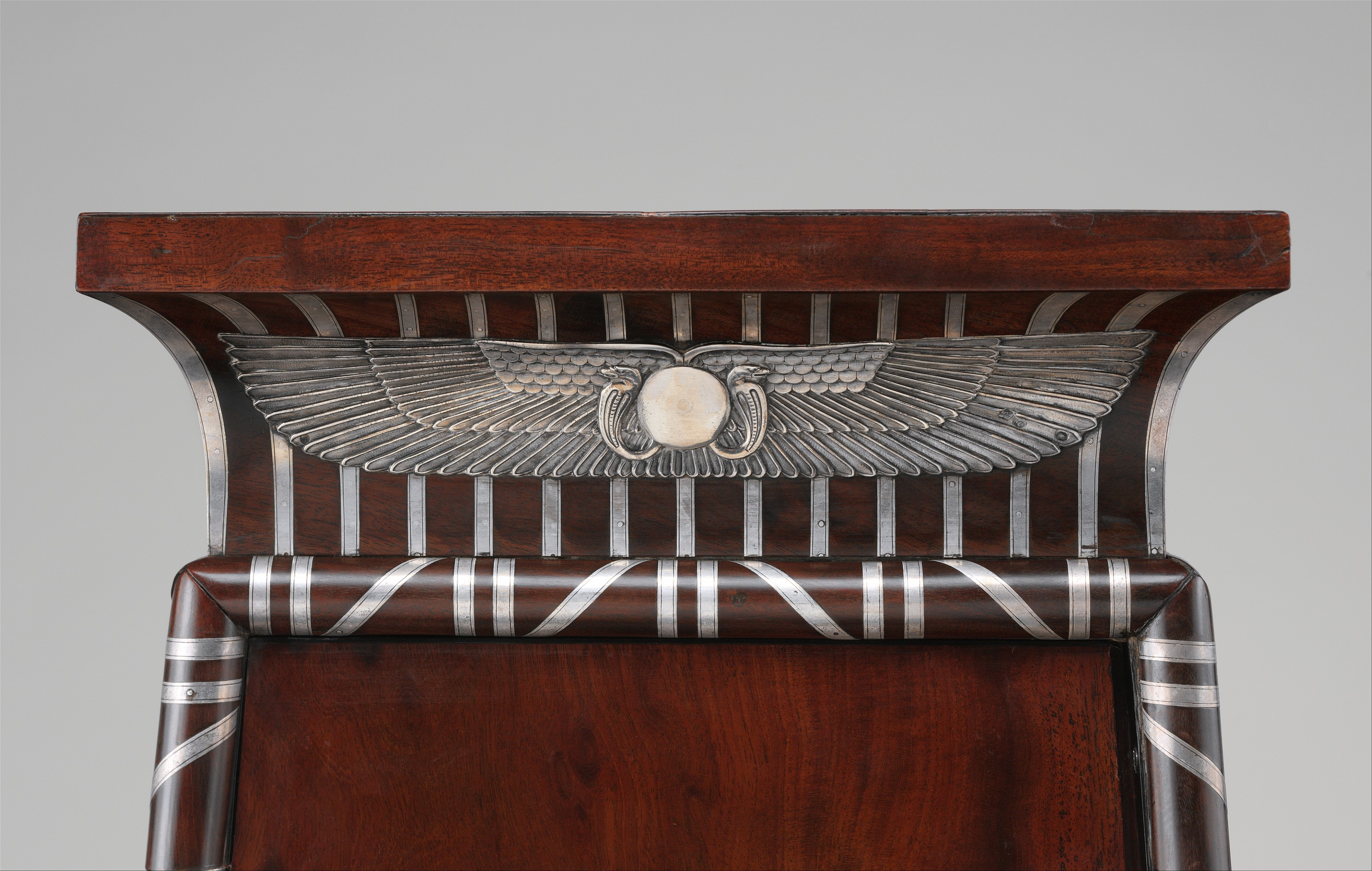
The top of an Egyptian Revival pylon-shaped coin cabinet, with a cornice and a winged sun

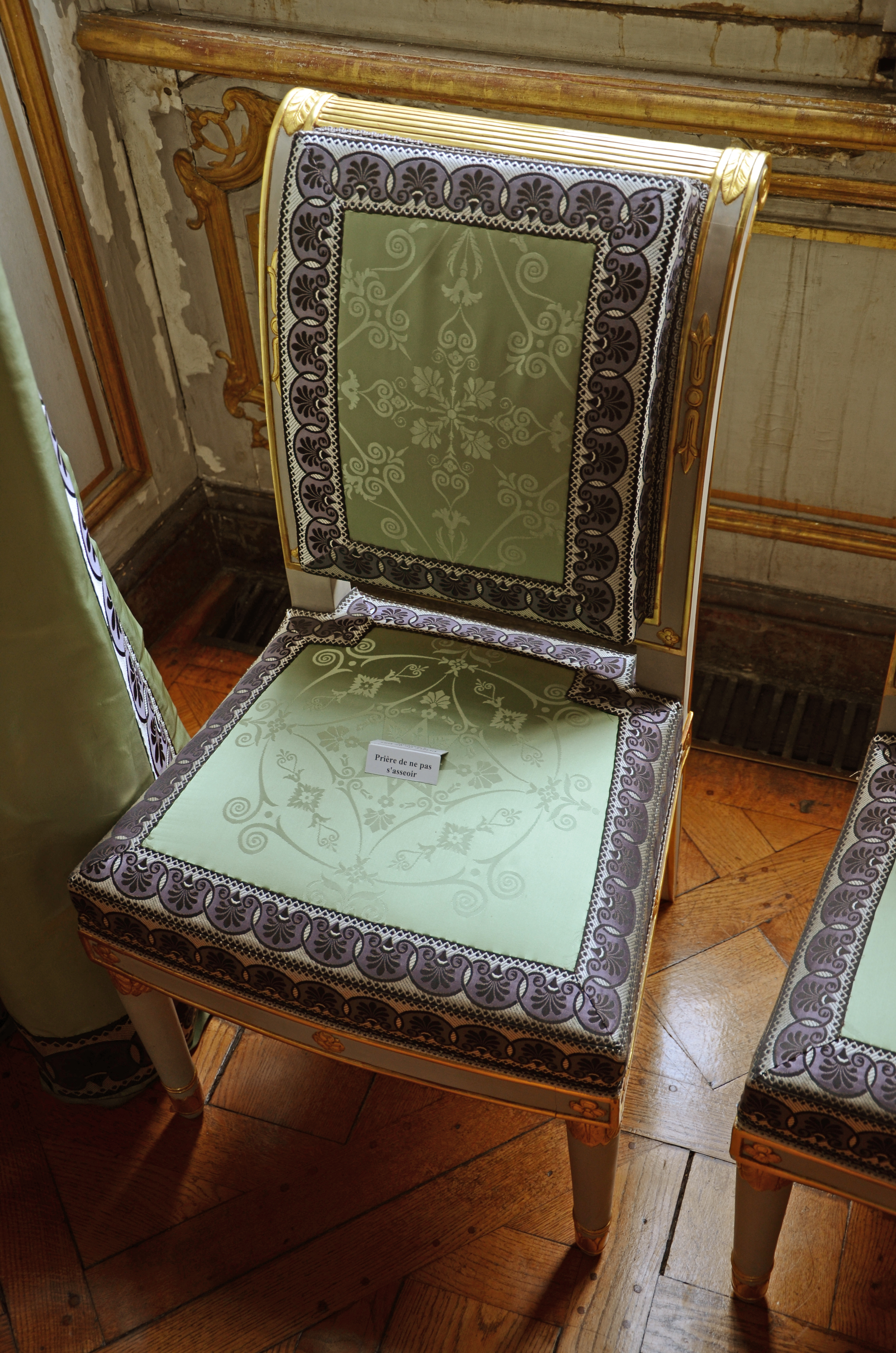
A chair decorated with various kinds of palmettes

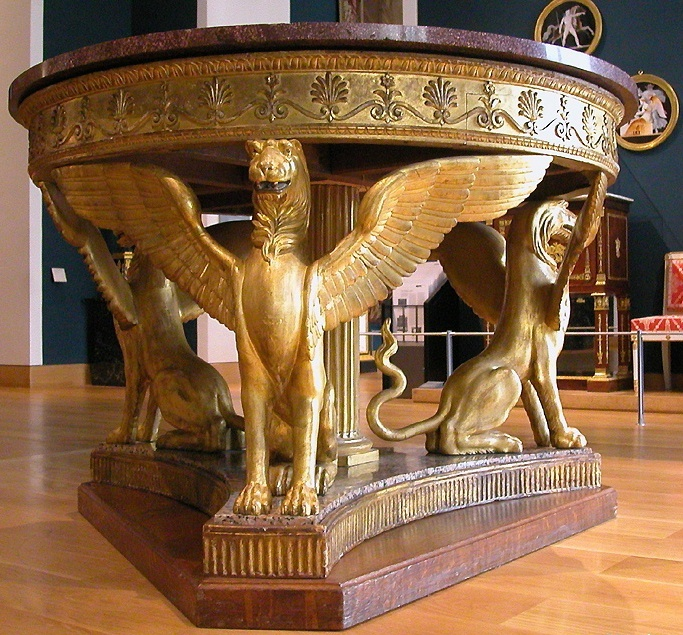
A table with three winged lions and a small long frieze with palmettes

== Architecture ==
The most famous Empire-style structures in France are the grand neoclassical Arc de Triomphe of Place de l'Étoile, Arc de Triomphe du Carrousel, Vendôme column, and La Madeleine, which were built in Paris to emulate the edifices of the Roman Empire. The style also was used widely in Imperial Russia, where it was used to celebrate the victory over Napoleon in such memorial structures as the General Staff Building, Kazan Cathedral, Alexander Column, and Narva Triumphal Gate. The Royal Palace of Amsterdam houses a complete collection of Empire furniture from the time of Louis Bonaparte, the largest collection outside of France.

Interiors have spacious rooms, richly decorated with symmetrically arranged motifs. The walls are decorated with Corinthian pilasters and vertical panels, having at the top a decorative frieze. The panels are covered with monumental paintings, stuccos, or with embroidered silks. The ceilings have light colours and fine ornaments.

Historic sites which present an homogeneous ensemble, examples of the decoration of interiors of the early 19th century are:

- Château de Malmaison in France
- Hôtel de Beauharnais in Paris
- Château de Compiègne in France
- Château de Fontainebleau in France
- Casa del Labrador in Spain
- Royal Palace of Amsterdam in The Netherlands
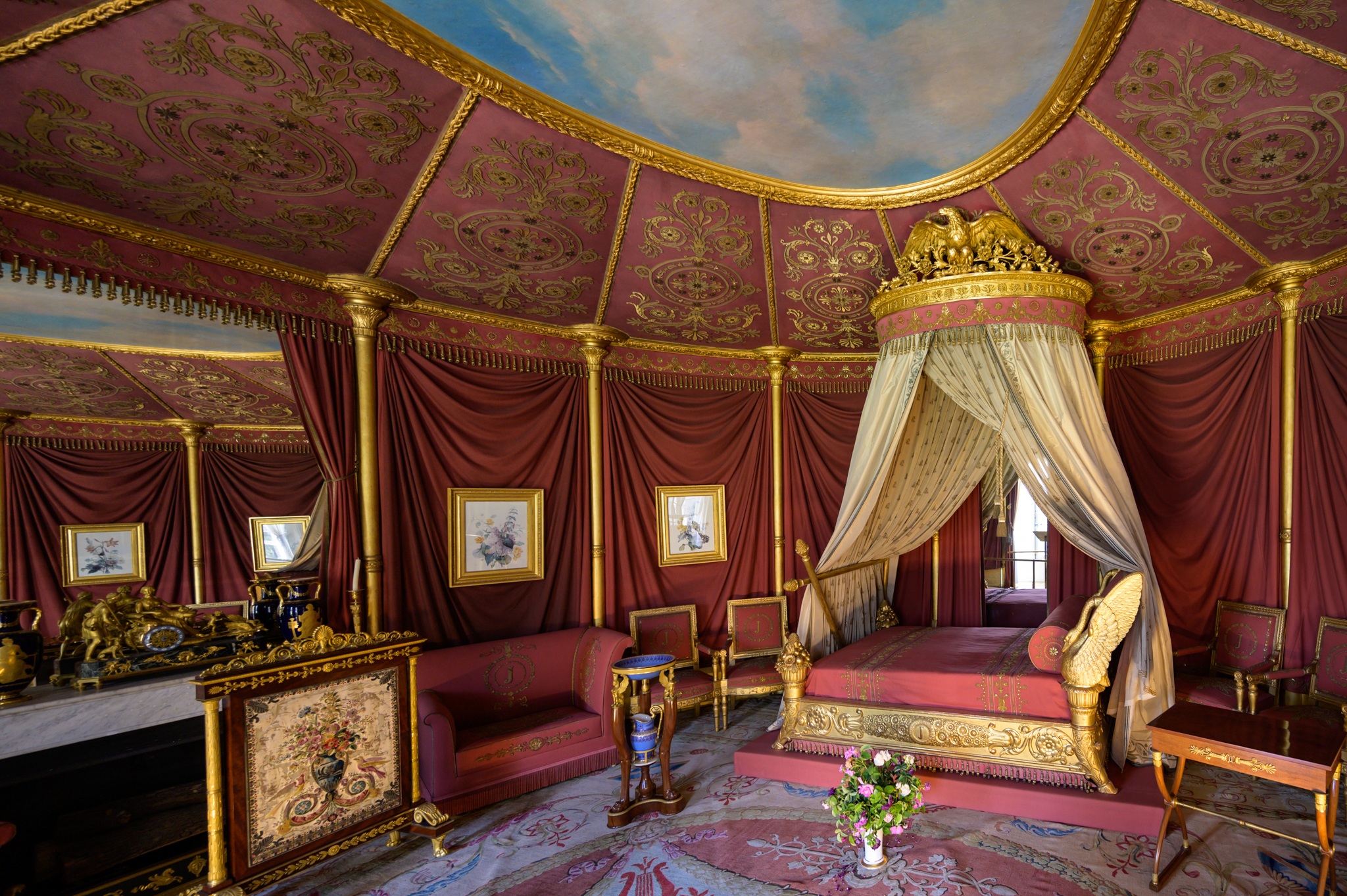
Empress Joséphine's Bedroom in Château de Malmaison (Rueil-Malmaison, France), 1800–1802, by Charles Percier and Pierre-François-Léonard Fontaine

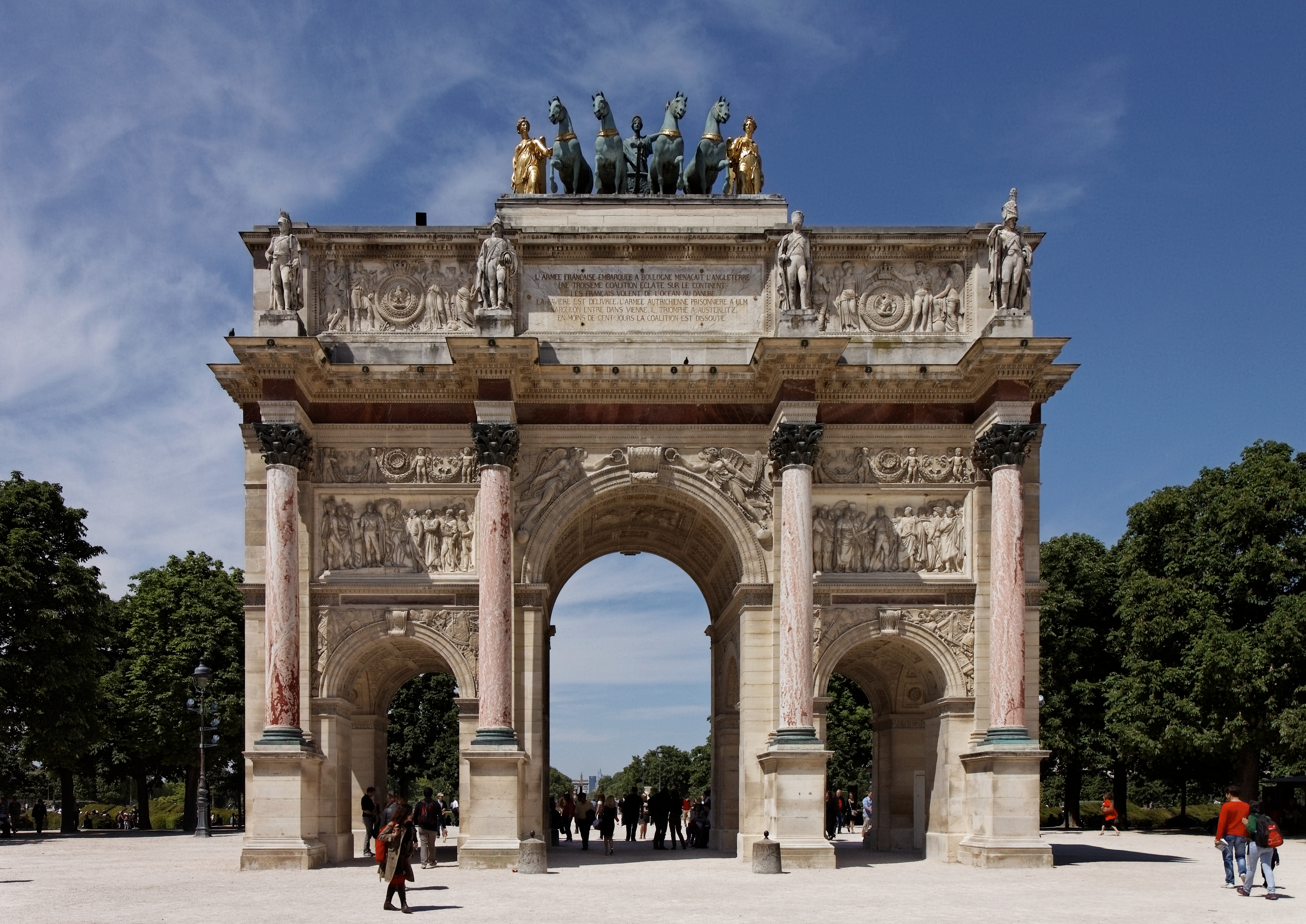
Arc de Triomphe du Carrousel (Paris), 1806–1808, by Charles Percier and Pierre-François-Léonard Fontaine

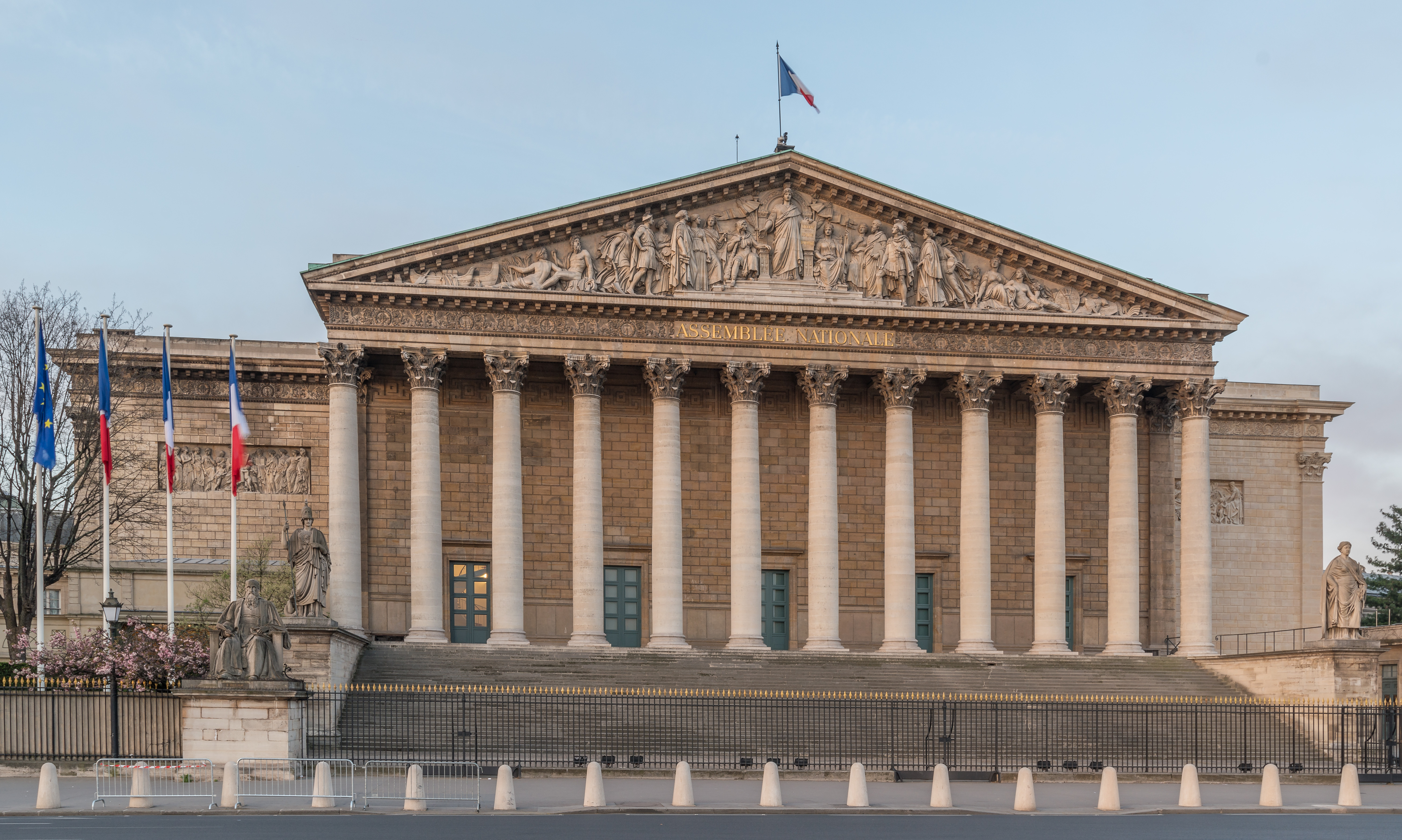
Portico of the Palais Bourbon (Paris), 1806–1808, by Bernard Poyet

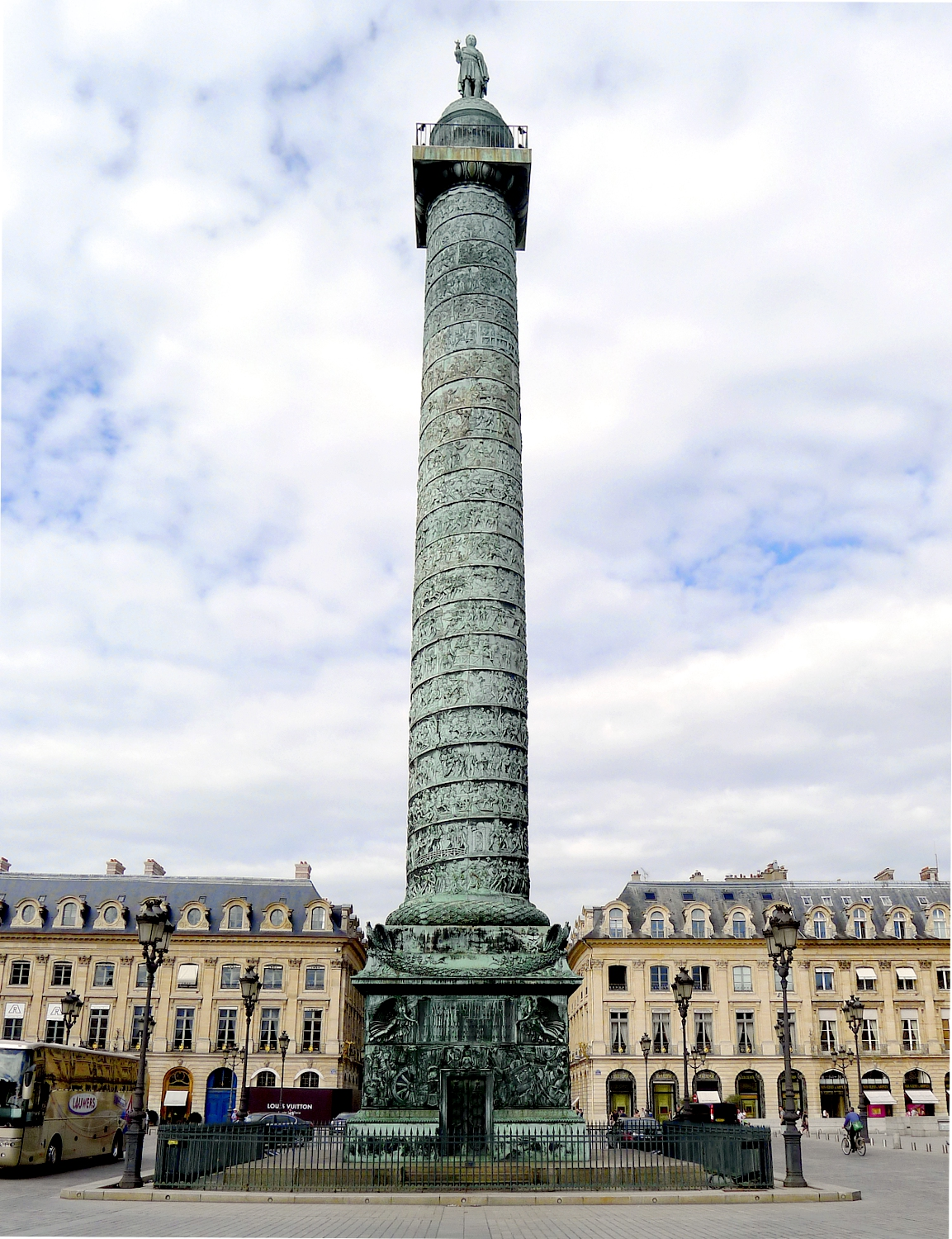
Vendôme Column (Place Vendôme, Paris), 1806–1810, by Jacques Gondouin and Jean-Baptiste Lepère

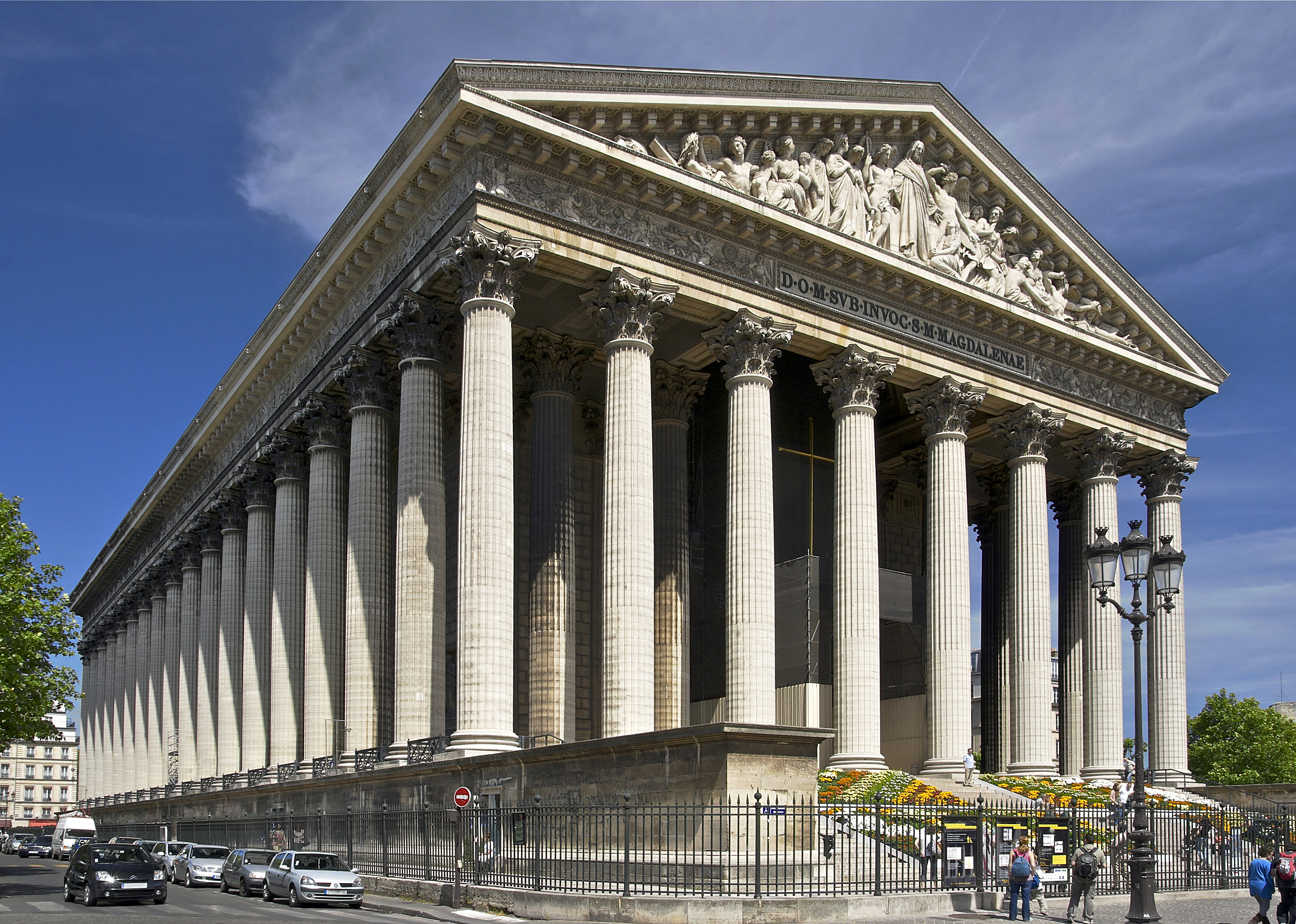
La Madeleine (Paris), 1807–1842, by Pierre-Alexandre Vignon

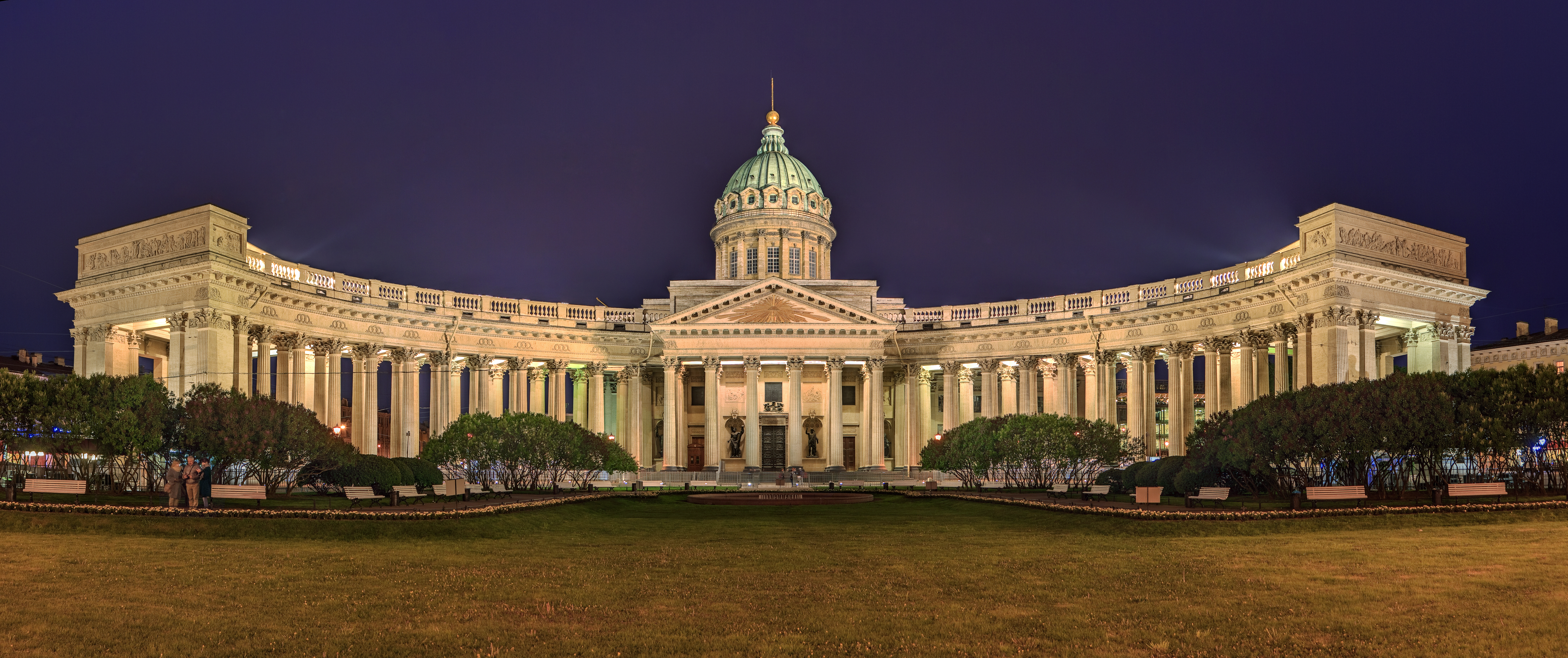
Kazan Cathedral (Saint Petersburg, Russia), 1811, by Andrey Voronikhin

== Furniture ==
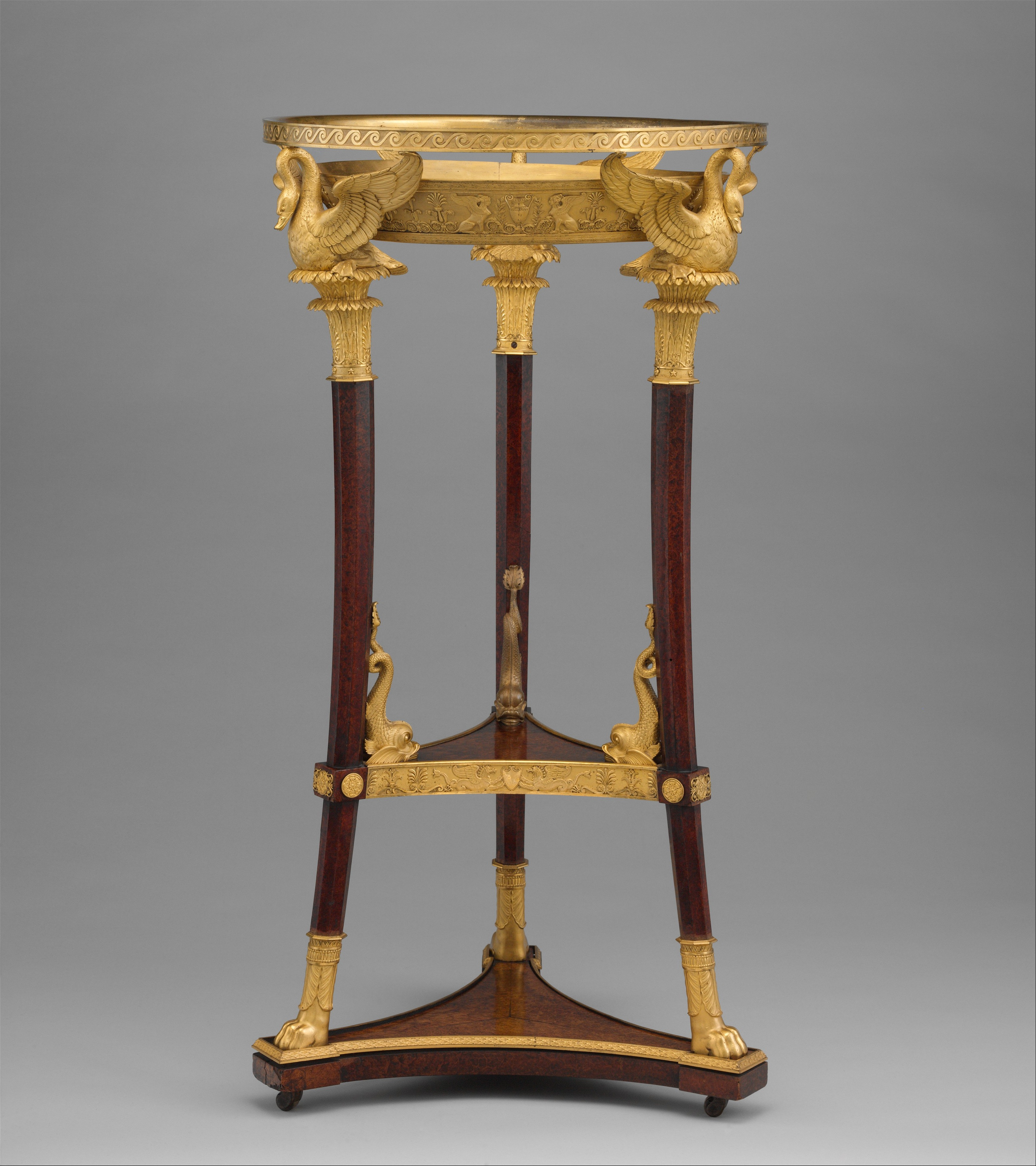
Washstand (athénienne or lavabo); 1800–1814; legs, base and shelf of yew wood, gilt-bronze mounts, iron plate beneath shelf; height: 92.4 cm, width: 49.5 cm; Metropolitan Museum of Art (New York City)

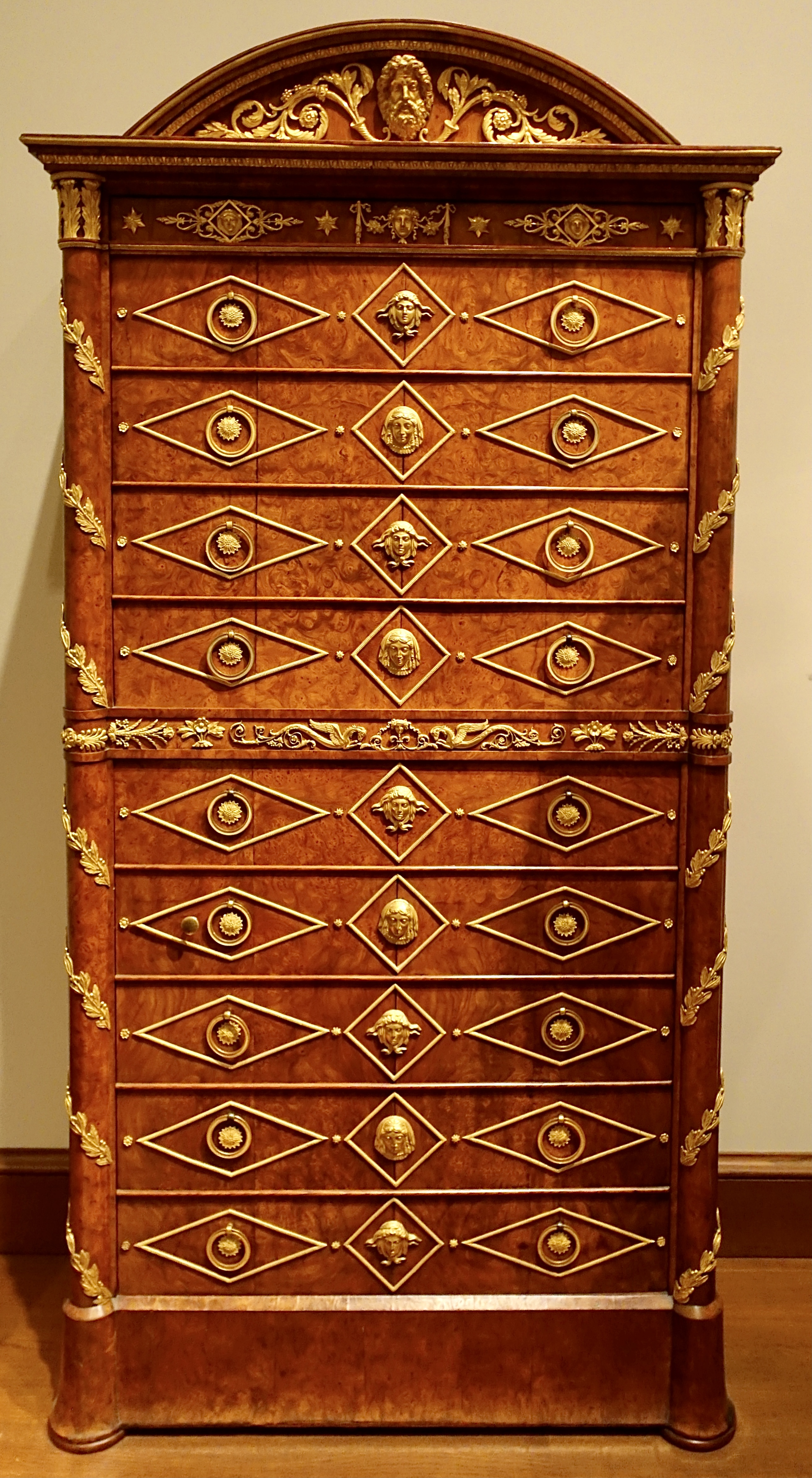
Secretary; c.1804-1809; amboyna wood veneered on pine, with gilt-bronze mounts; 173.4 x 87.6 x 37.8 cm; Metropolitan Museum of Art

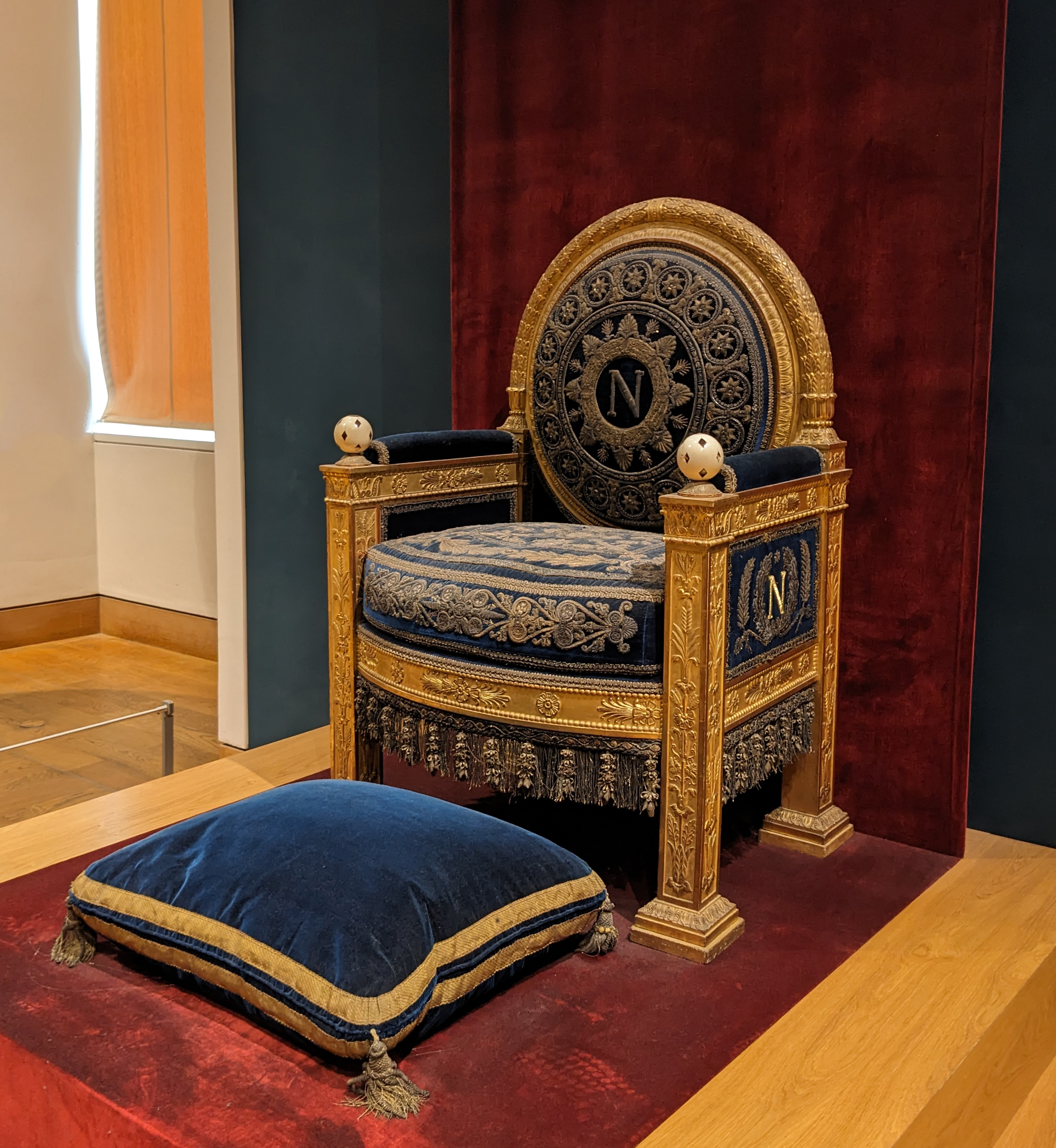
Throne of Napoleon I; by Georges Jacob and François-Honoré-Georges Jacob-Desmalter; 1804; embroidered velvet, gilt wood and ivory; height: 1.2 m; Louvre

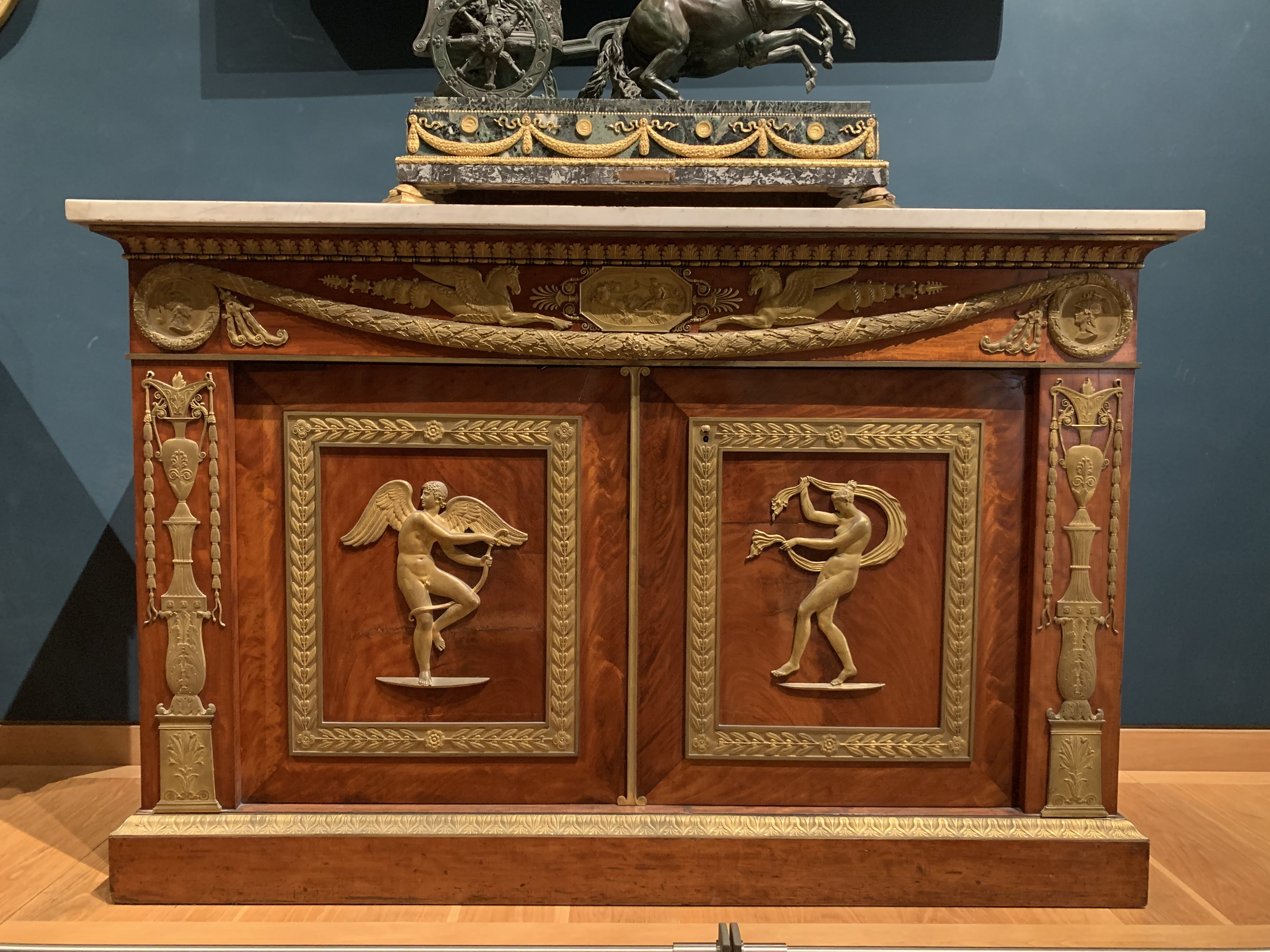
Commode with two door panels; before 1805; mahogany with bronze mounts; 1.165 x 1.794 x 0.83 m; Louvre

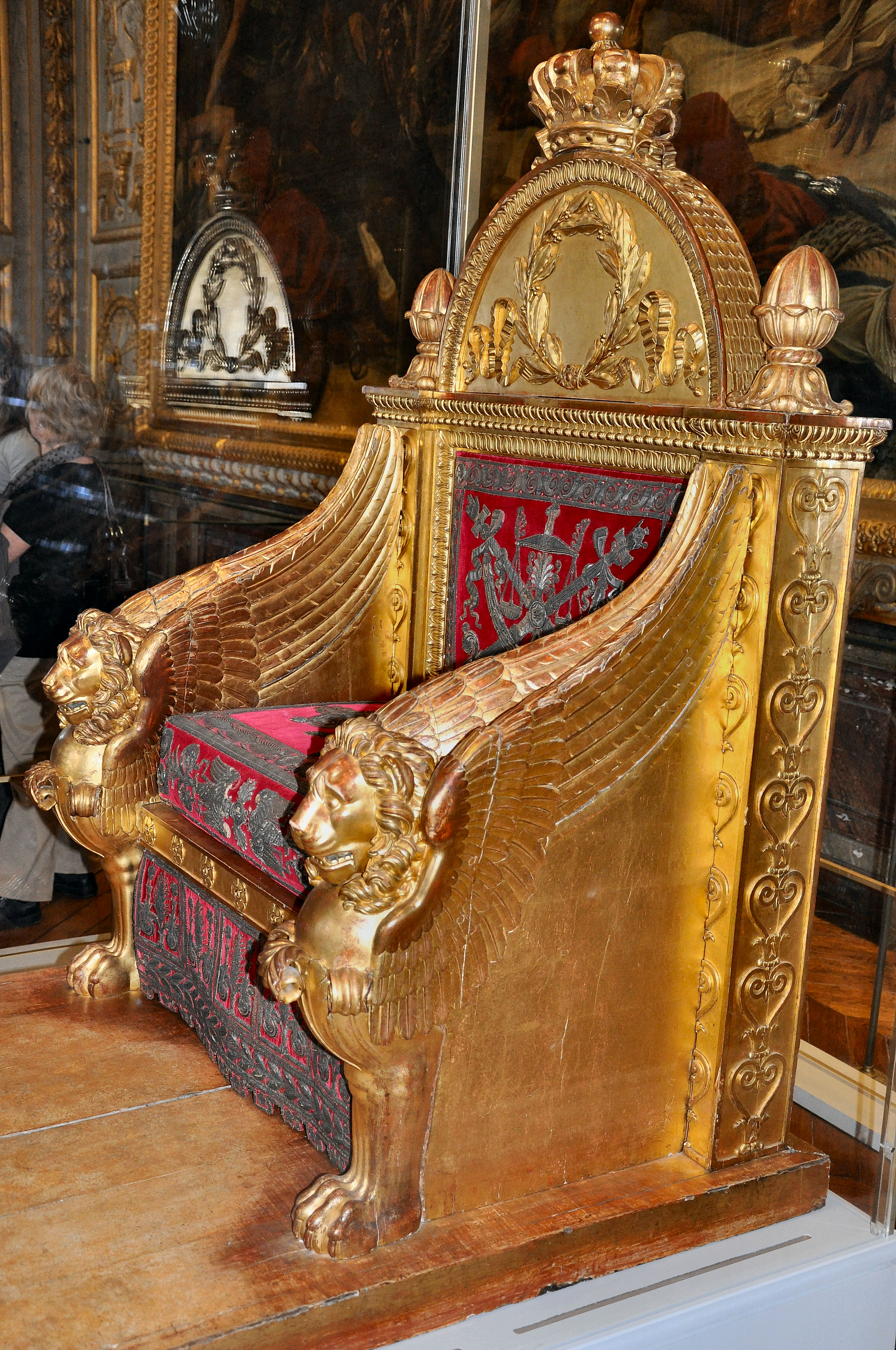
Throne; by Bernard Poyet and François-Honoré-Georges Jacob-Desmalter; 1805; carved and gilded wood, covered in red velvet with silver embroidery; 160 x 110 x 82 cm; Musée des Arts Décoratifs (Paris)

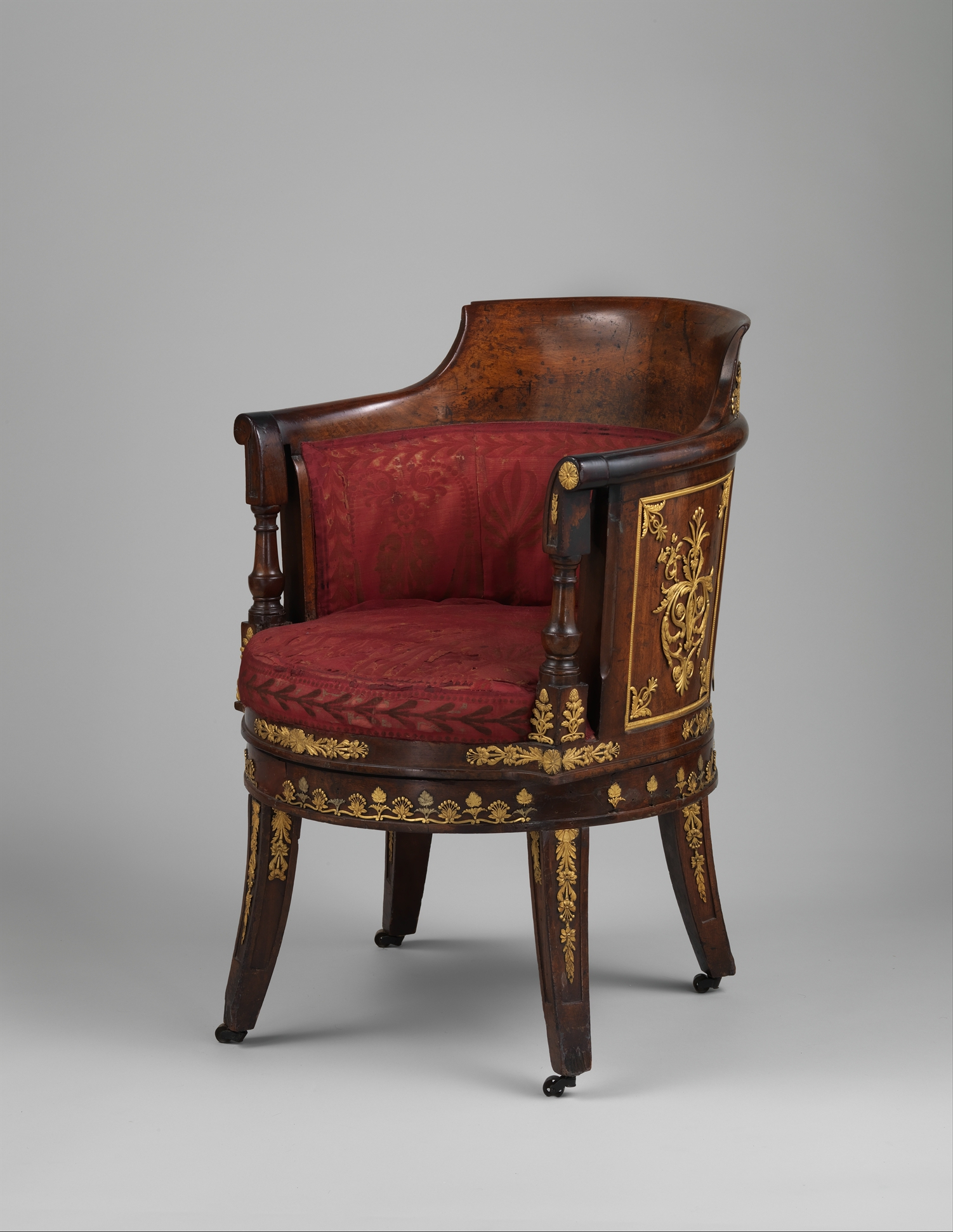
Desk chair; c.1805–1808; mahogany, gilt bronze and satin-velvet upholstery; 87.6 × 59.7 × 64.8 cm; Metropolitan Museum of Art

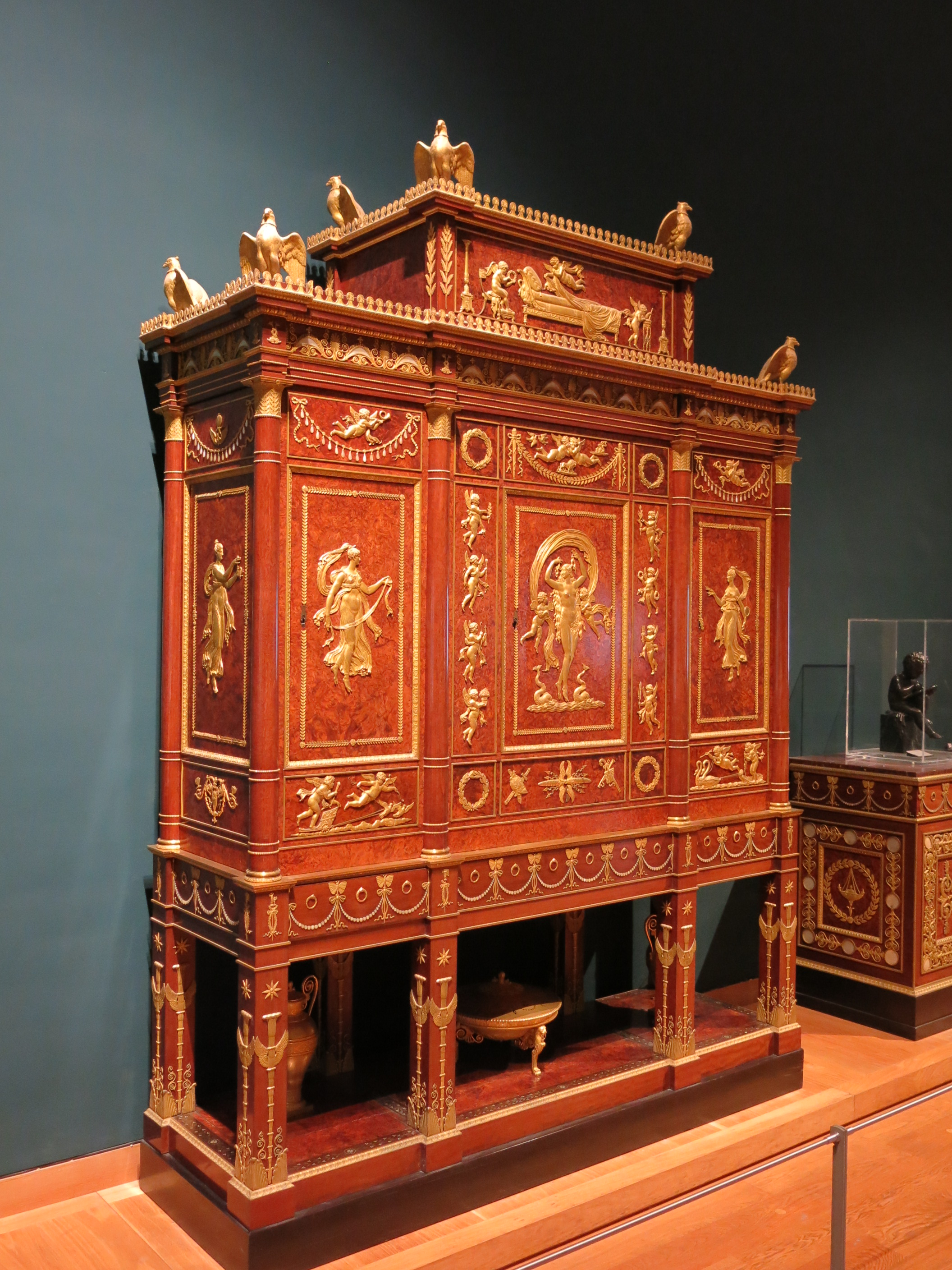
Jewelry holder of the Empress Joséphine de Beauharnais; by François-Honoré-Georges Jacob-Desmalter; 1809; mahogany, amaranth, ebony, taxus, mother-of-pearl, and gilt bronze mounts; 2.76 x 2 x 0.6 m; Louvre

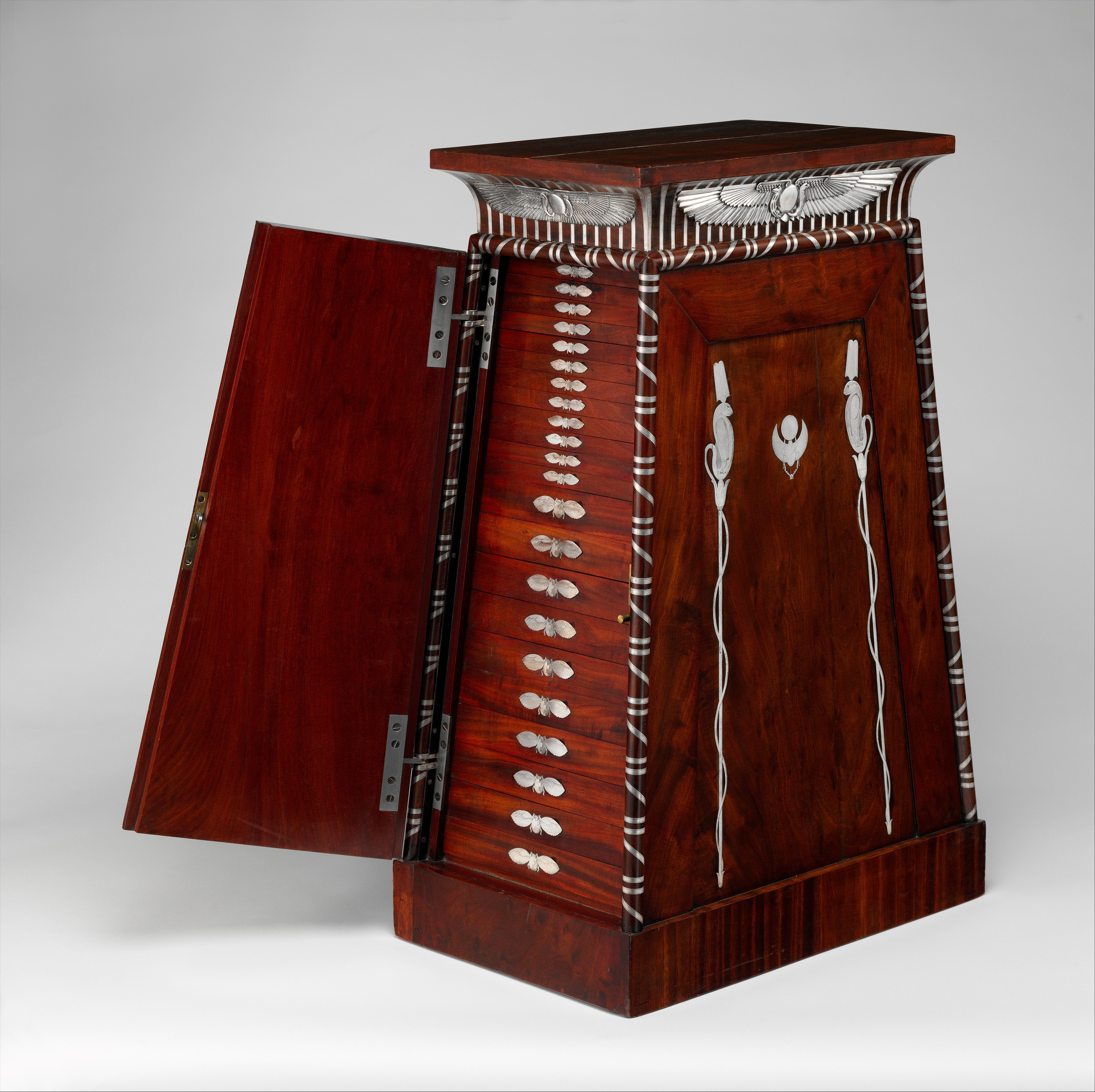
Egyptian Revival coin cabinet; by François-Honoré-Georges Jacob-Desmalter; 1809–1819; mahogany (probably Swietenia mahagoni), with applied and inlaid silver; 90.2 x 50.2 x 37.5 cm; Metropolitan Museum of Art

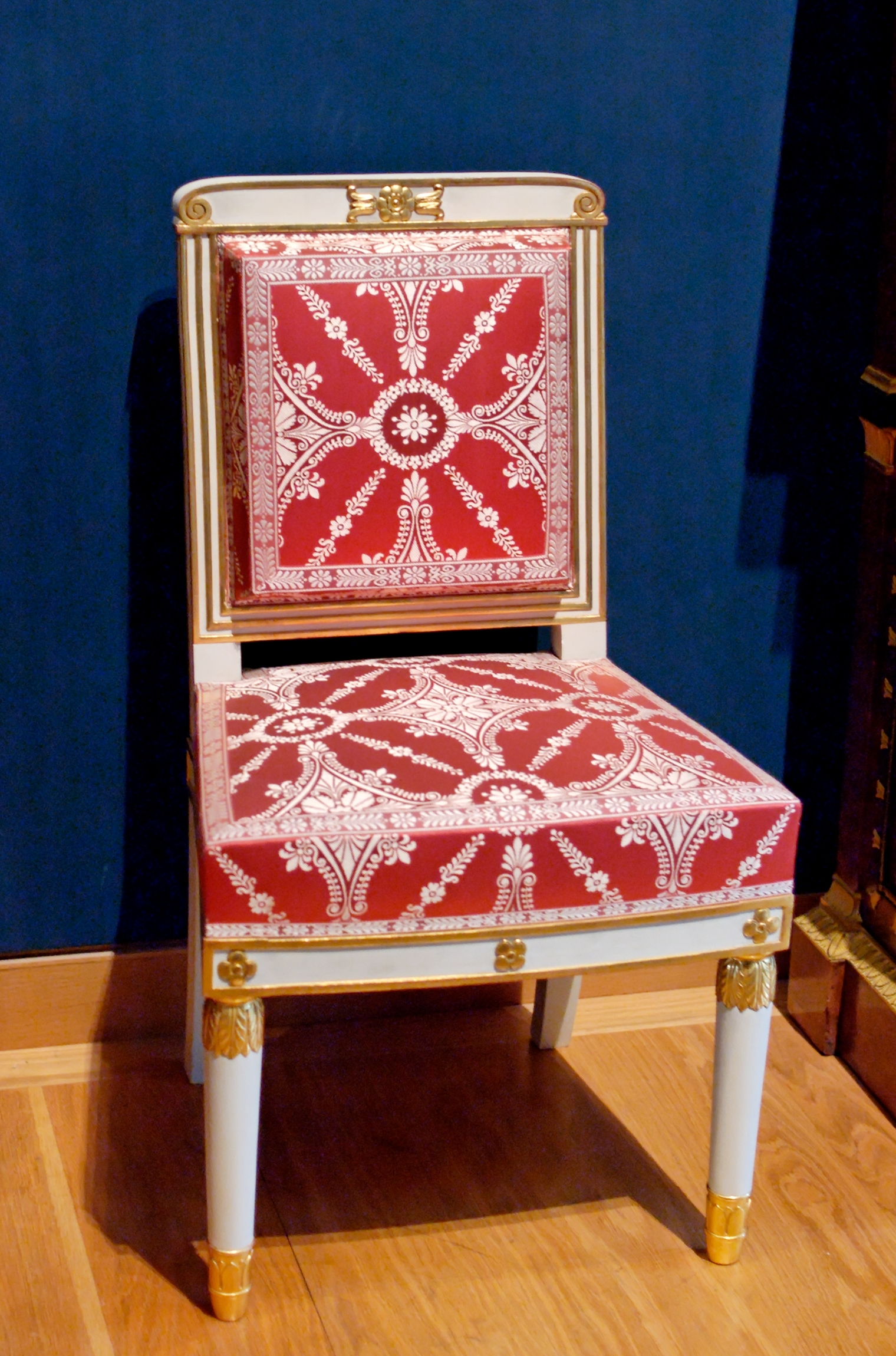
Chair; before 1810; white trimmed wood with gilt carved decoration, modern trim, red and white silk; 90 x 50.5 x 44 cm; Louvre

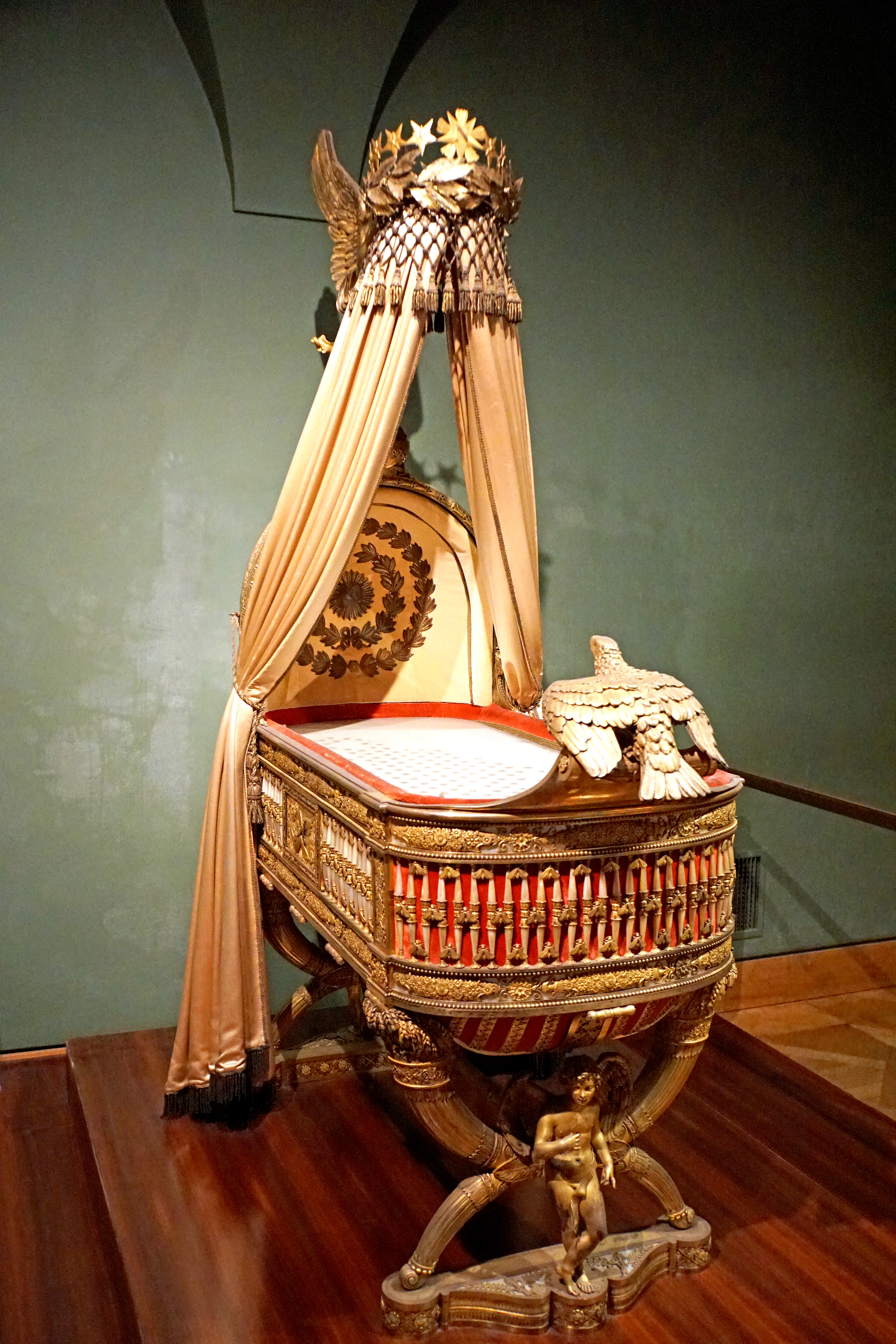
King of Rome's Cradle (Empire); by Pierre-Paul Prud'hon, Henri-Victor Roguier, Jean-Baptiste-Claude Odiot and Pierre-Philippe Thomire; 1811; wood, silver gilt, mother-of-pearl, sheets of copper covered with velvet, silk and tulle, decorated with silver and gold thread; height: 216 cm; Kunsthistorisches Museum (Vienna, Austria)

== Clocks and candelabrums ==
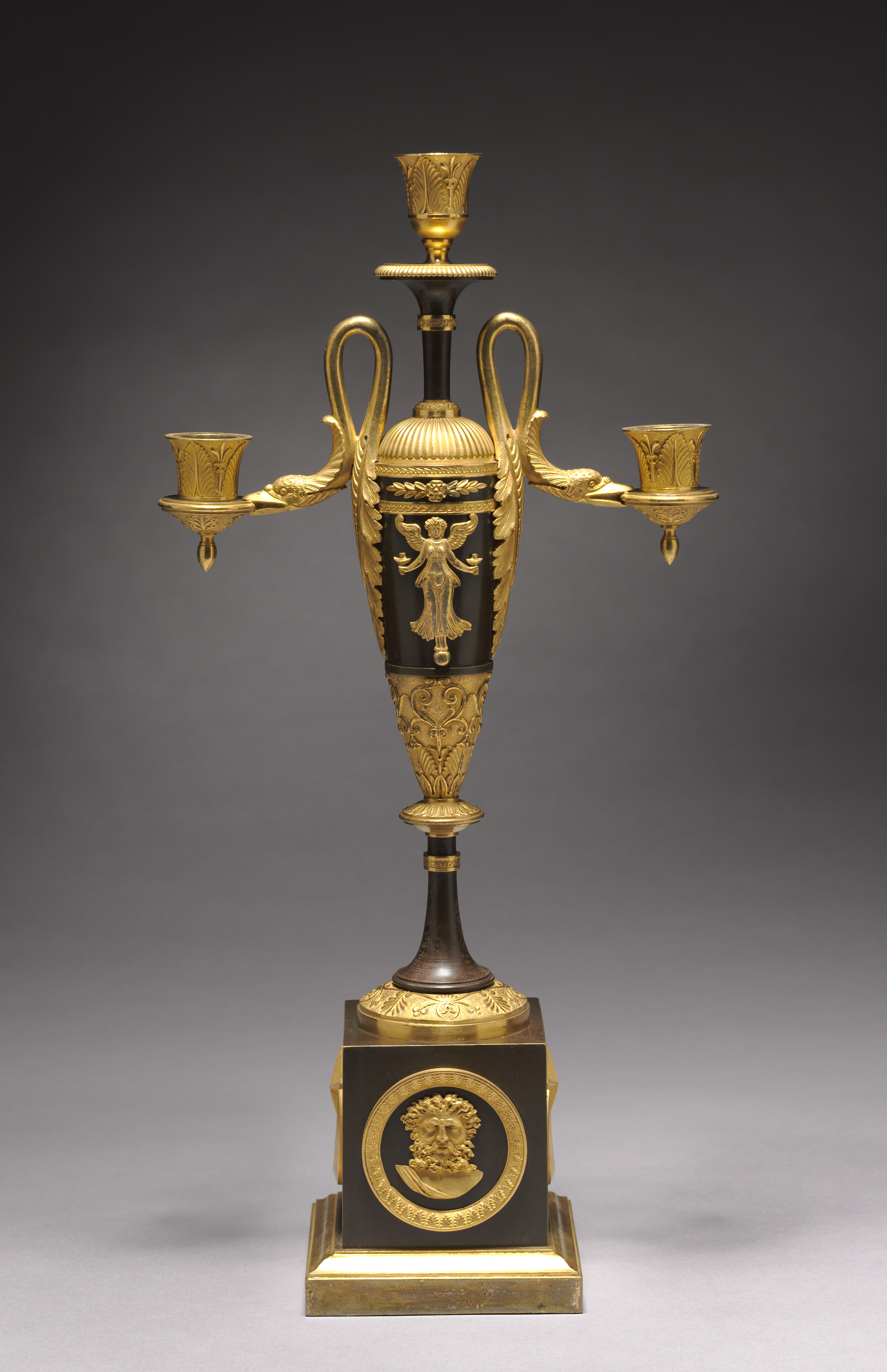
Candelabrum; circa 1800; gilt and patinated metal; overall: 49.9 x 25.7 x 12.3 cm; Cleveland Museum of Art (Cleveland, Ohio, US)

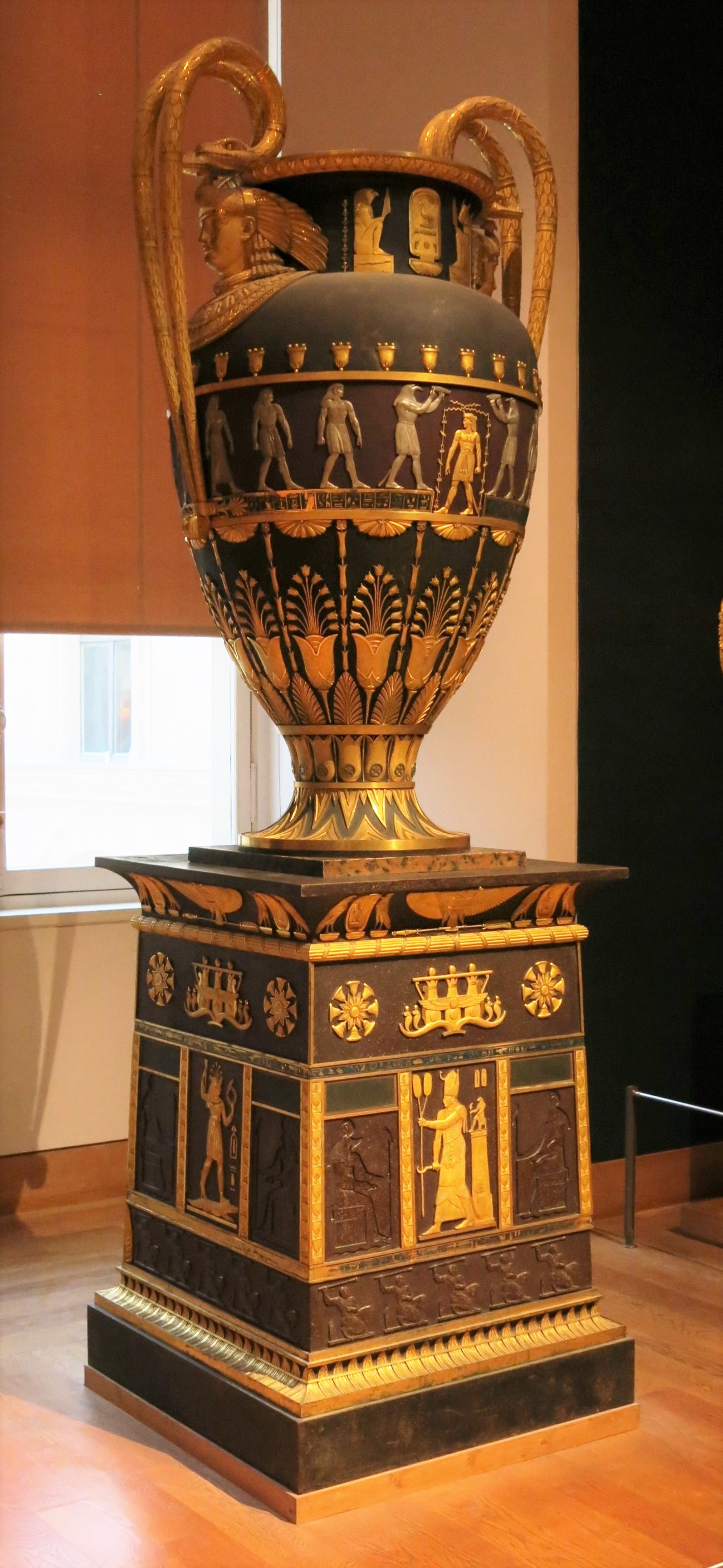
Egyptian Revival vase with pedestal; 1804–1806; varnished sheet and gilded bronze; height: 1.80 m, depth: 0.95 m; Louvre

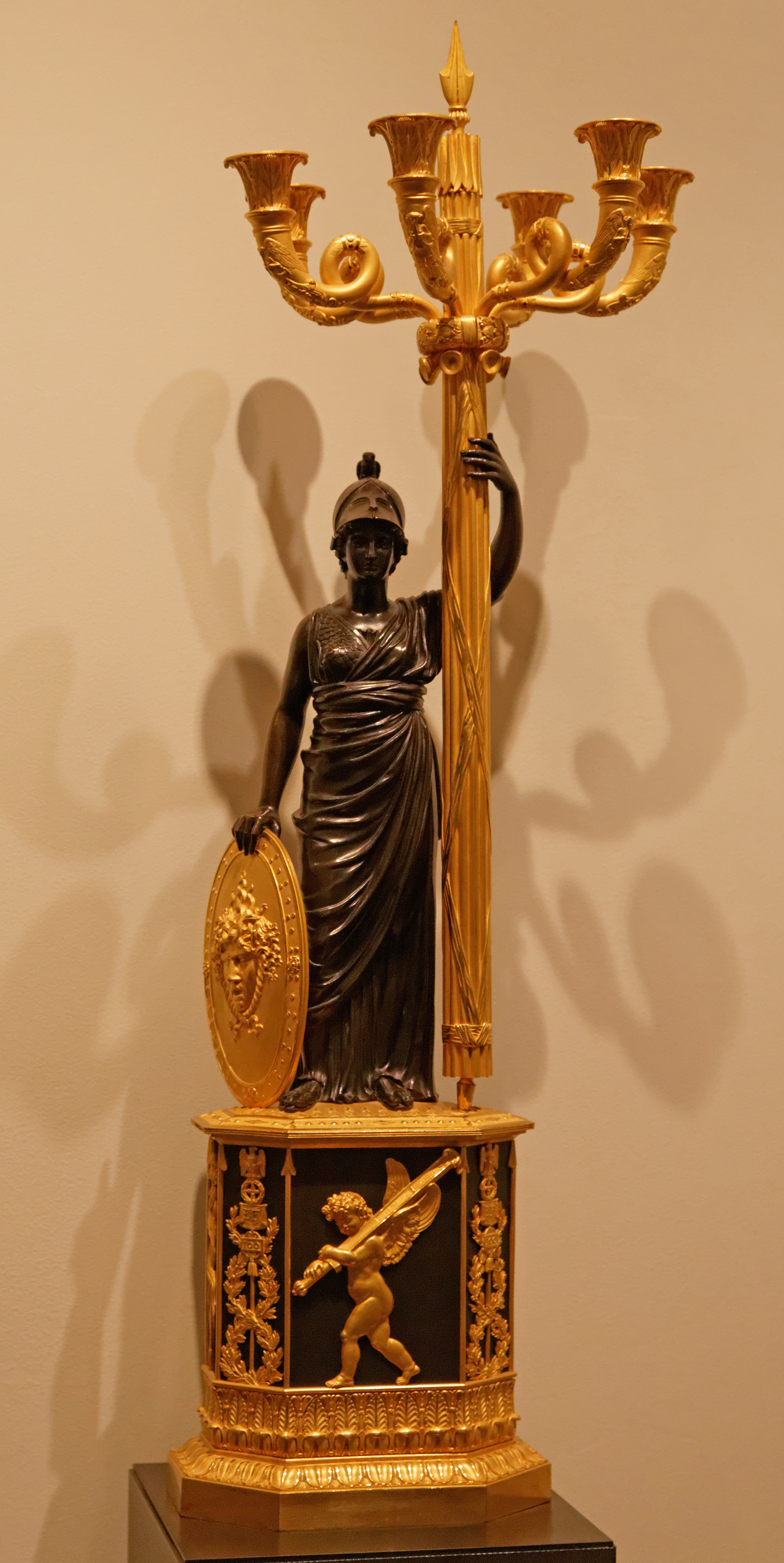
Minerva candelabra; 1804–1814; gilded and patinated bronze; height: 101 cm, width of the plinth: 25 cm, depth of the plinth: 19 cm; Musée des Arts décoratifs, Paris

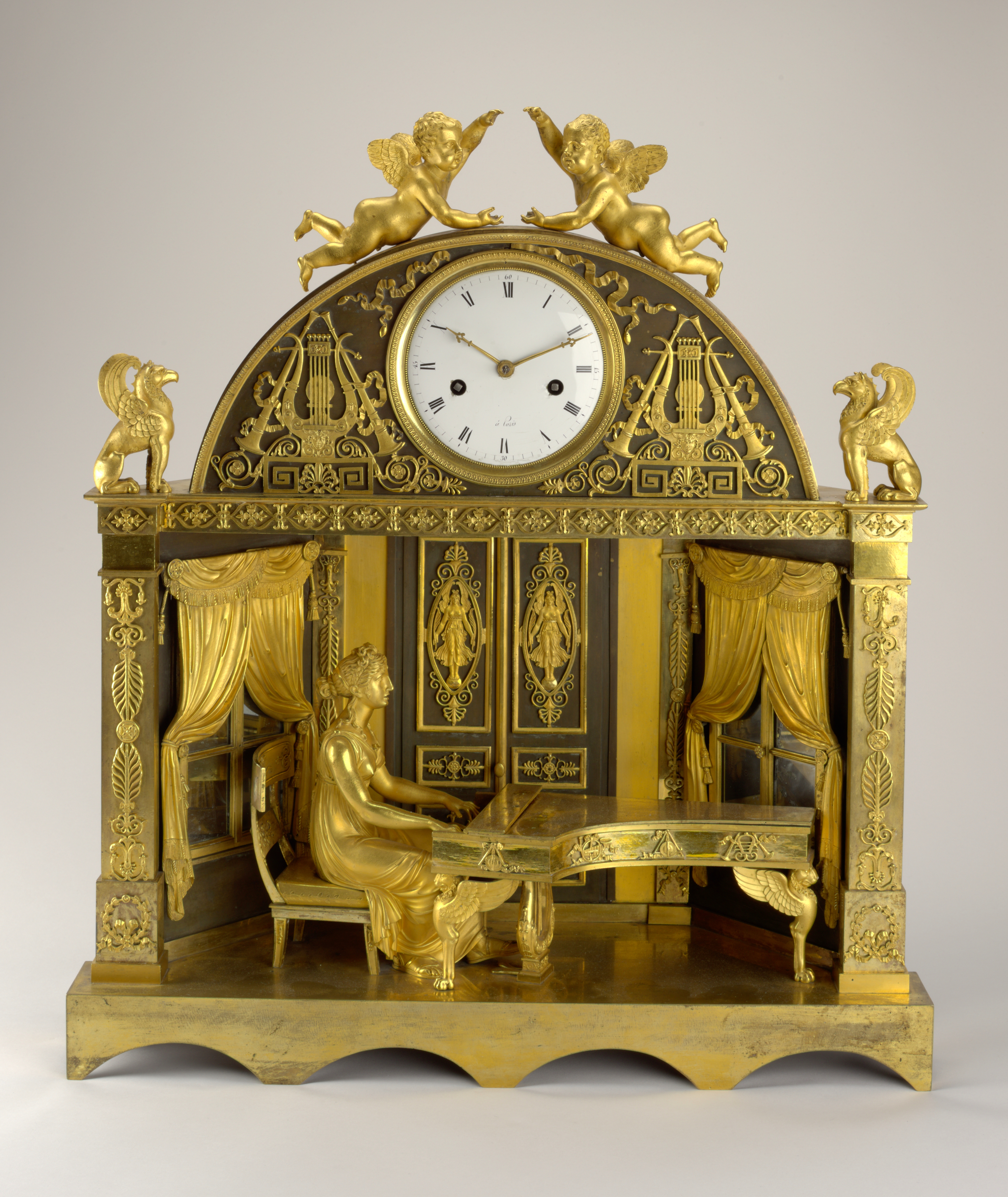
Clock; 1807–1810; fire-gilt bronze, blackened bronze, enameled metal (dial), blued steel (hands); glass; 56 x 49.7 x 18.5 cm; Cooper Hewitt, Smithsonian Design Museum (New York City)

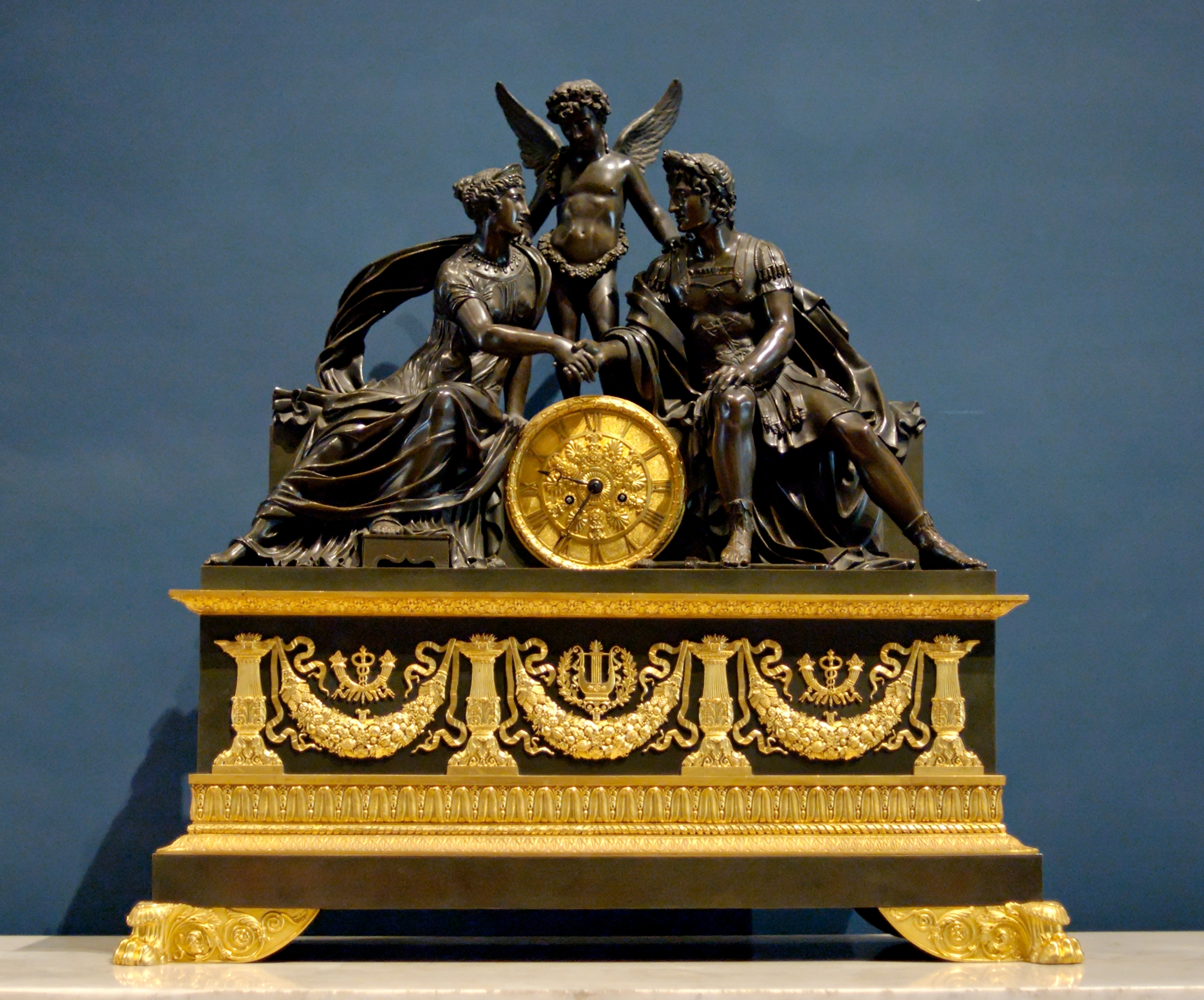
Clock with Mars and Venus; by Pierre-Philippe Thomire; circa 1810; gilded bronze and patina; height: 90 cm; Louvre

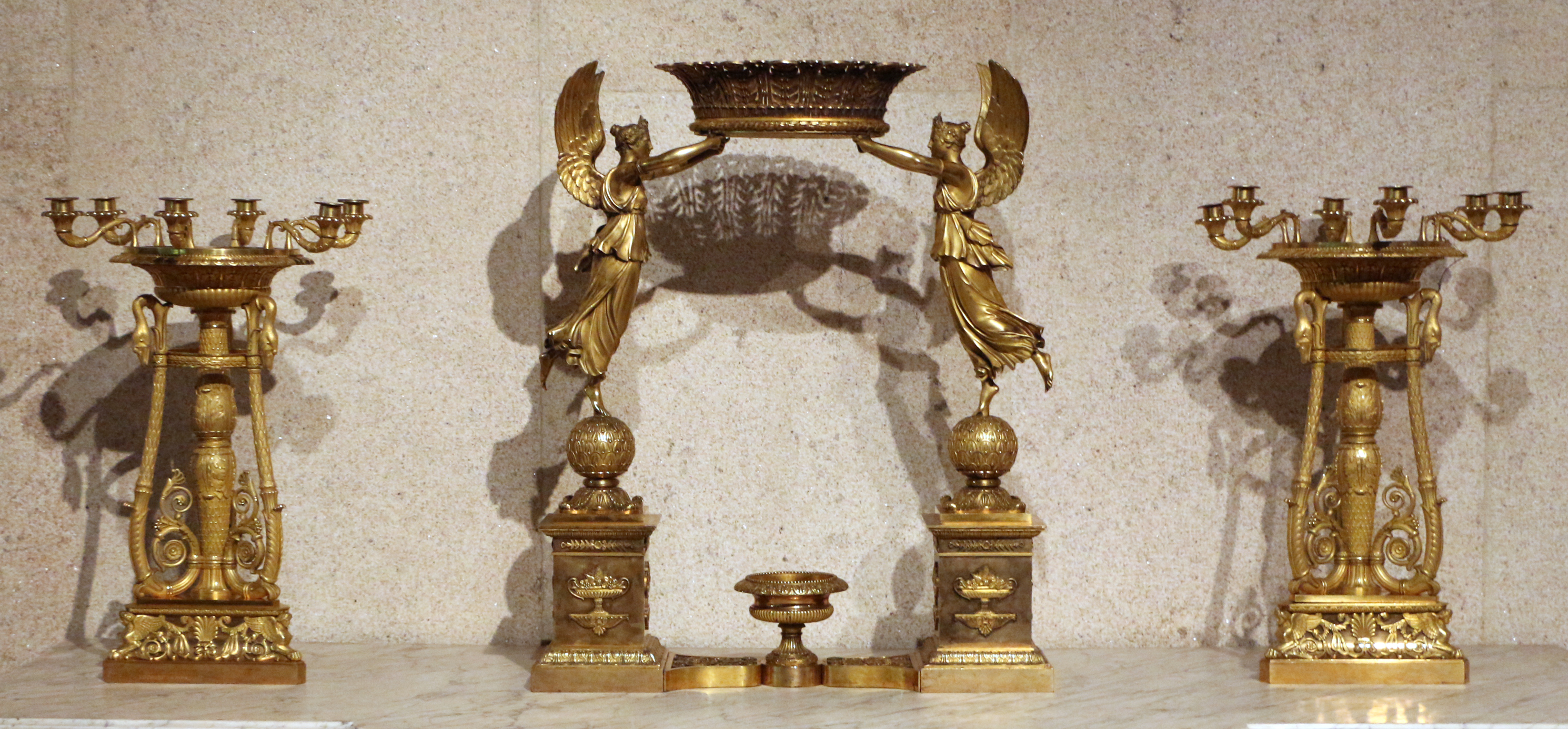
Centerpiece between two candelabra; by Pierre-Philippe Thomire; circa 1810; probably gilded bronze; Calouste Gulbenkian Museum (Lisbon, Portugal)

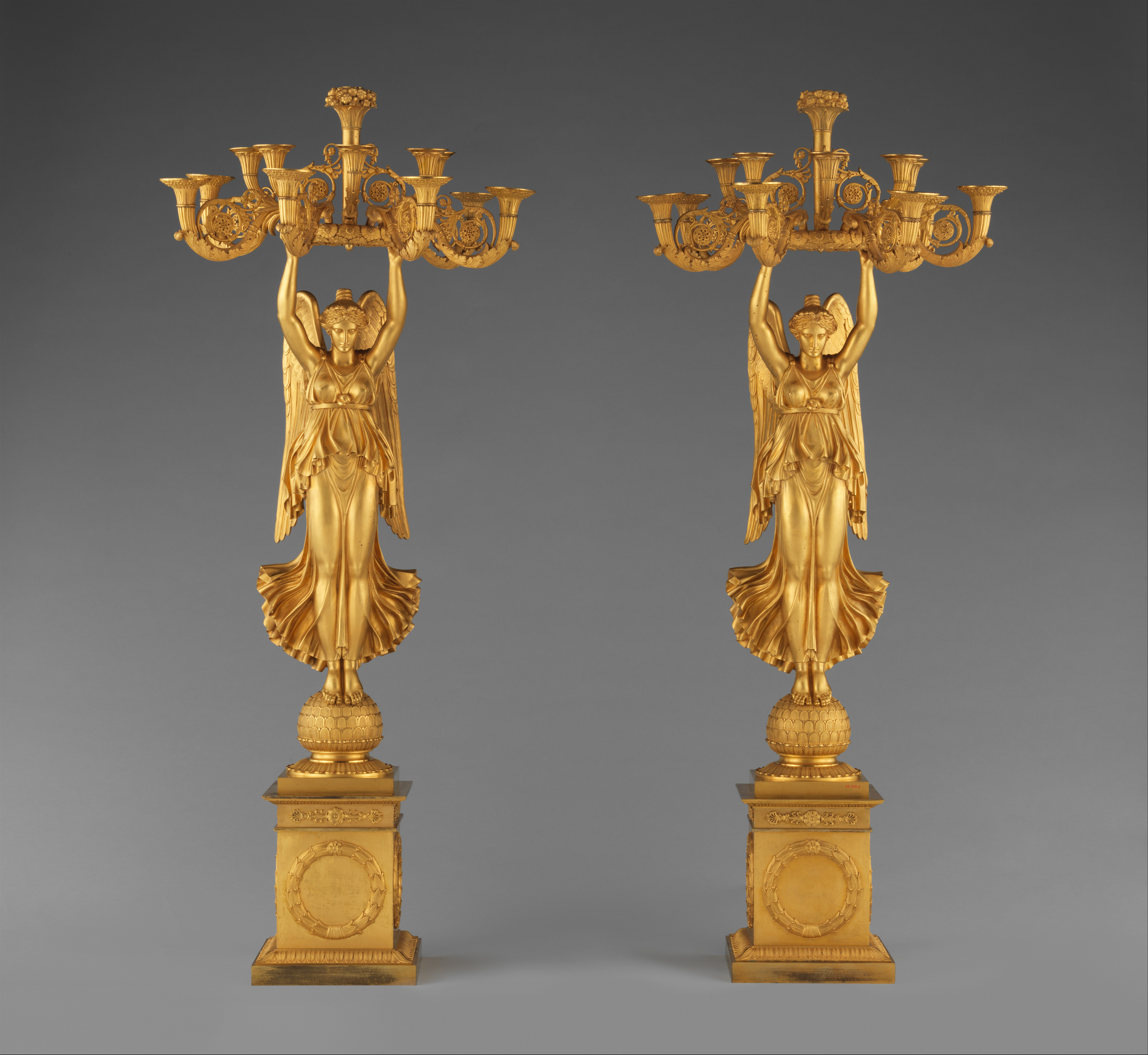
Pair of candelabra with Winged Victories; 1810–1815; gilt bronze; height (each): 127.6 cm; Metropolitan Museum of Art (New York City)

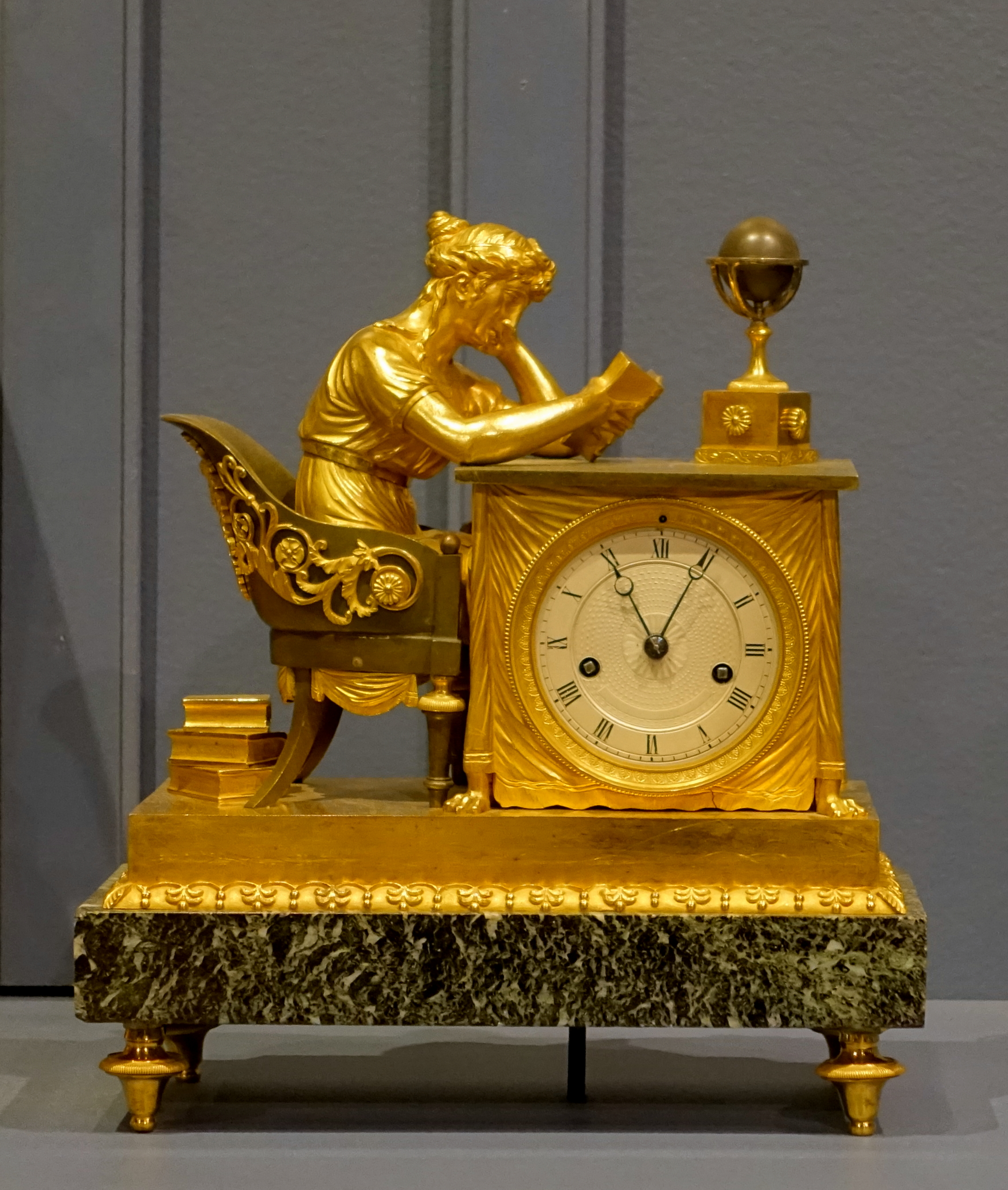
Mantel clock called The Reader; by Jean-Andre Reiche; circa 1810; matte and polished gilt bronze and "Vert de Mer" marble; 31 x 15 x 26 cm; Montreal Museum of Fine Arts (Montreal, Canada)

== Ceramic ==
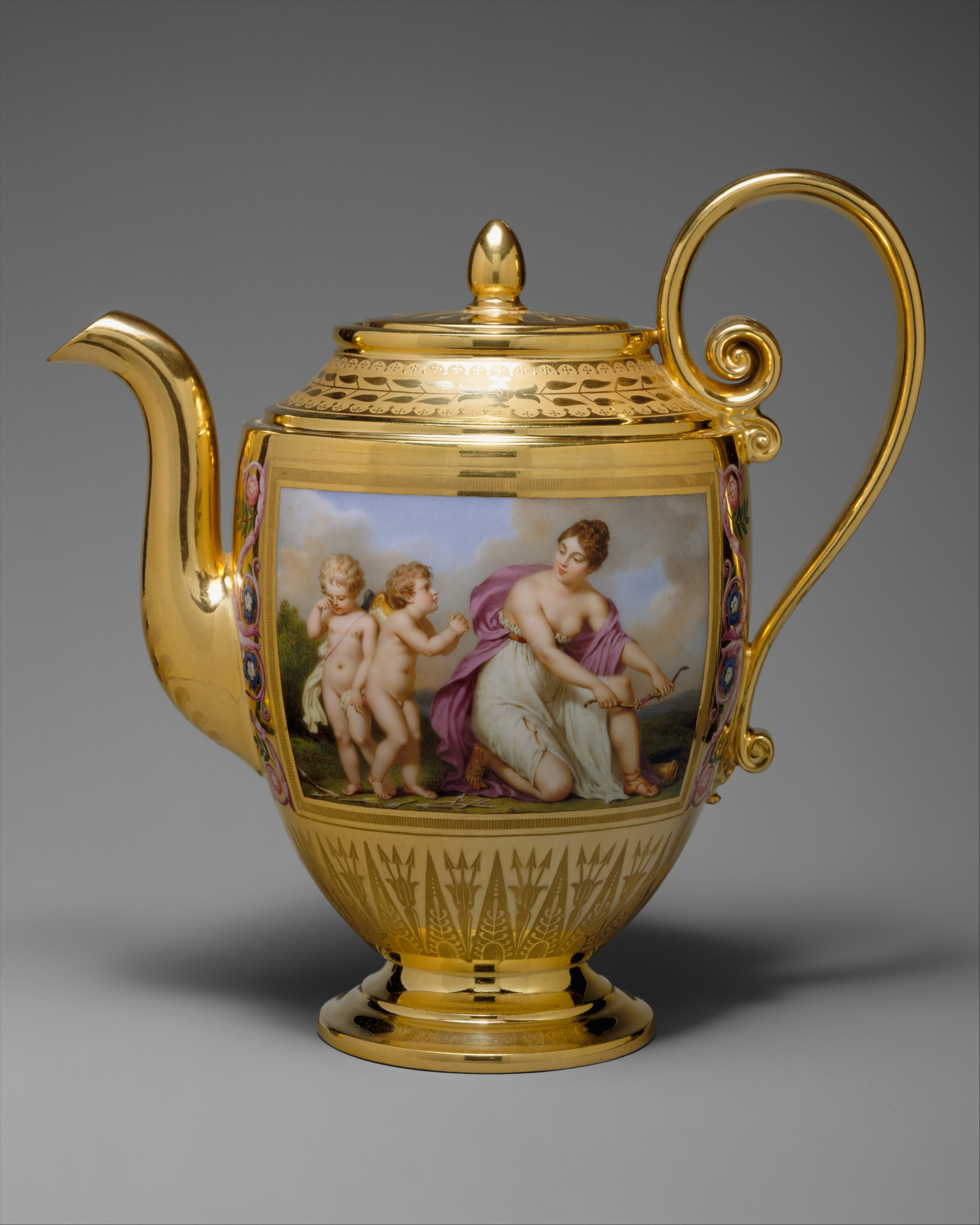
Teapot (théière Asselin), part of a breakfast service (déjeuner); 1813; hard-paste porcelain; height (with handle): 20.5 cm; Metropolitan Museum of Art (New York City)

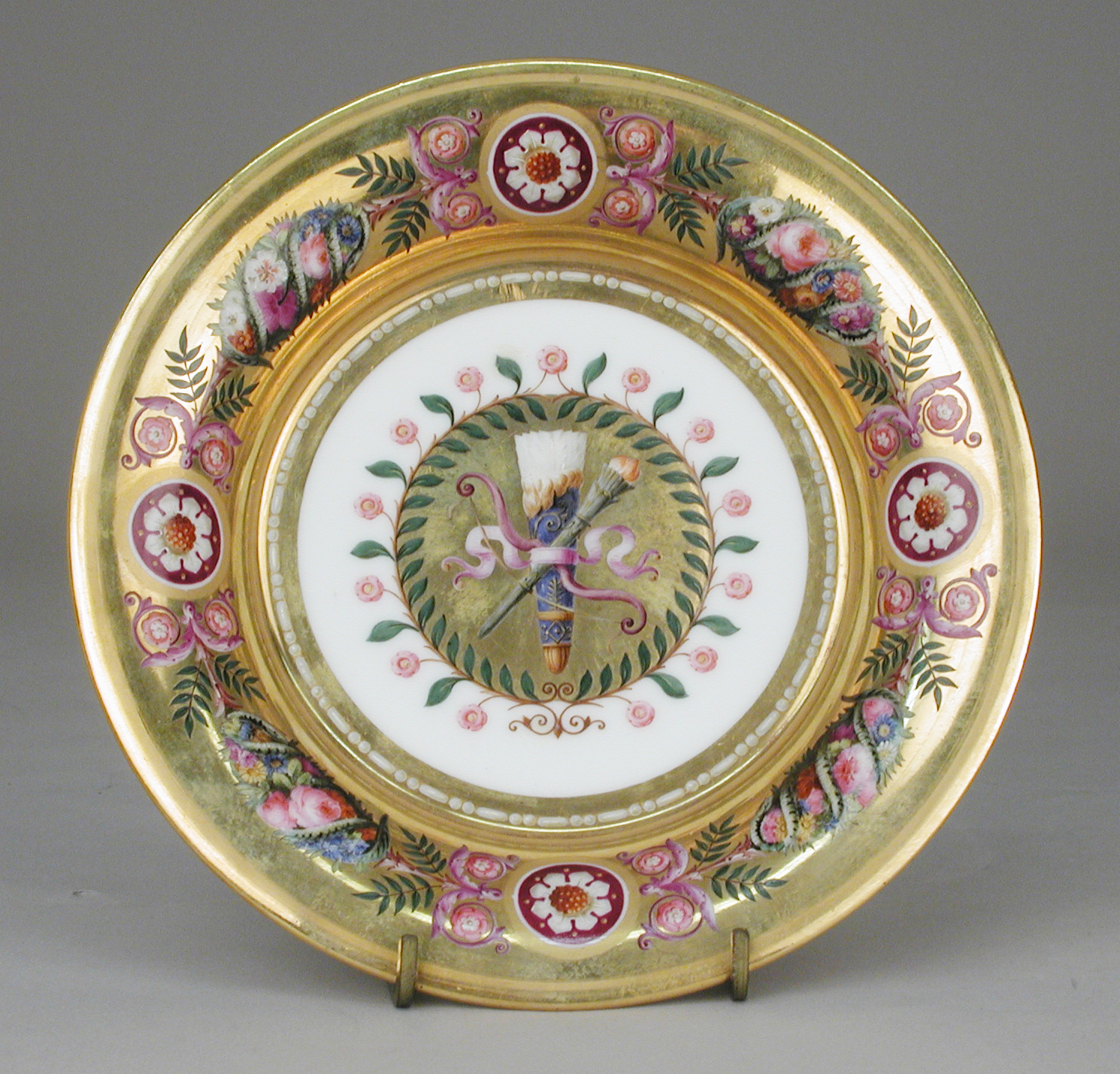
Saucer, part of a breakfast service (déjeuner); 1813; hard-paste porcelain; height: 3.2 cm; diameter: 16.2 cm; Metropolitan Museum of Art

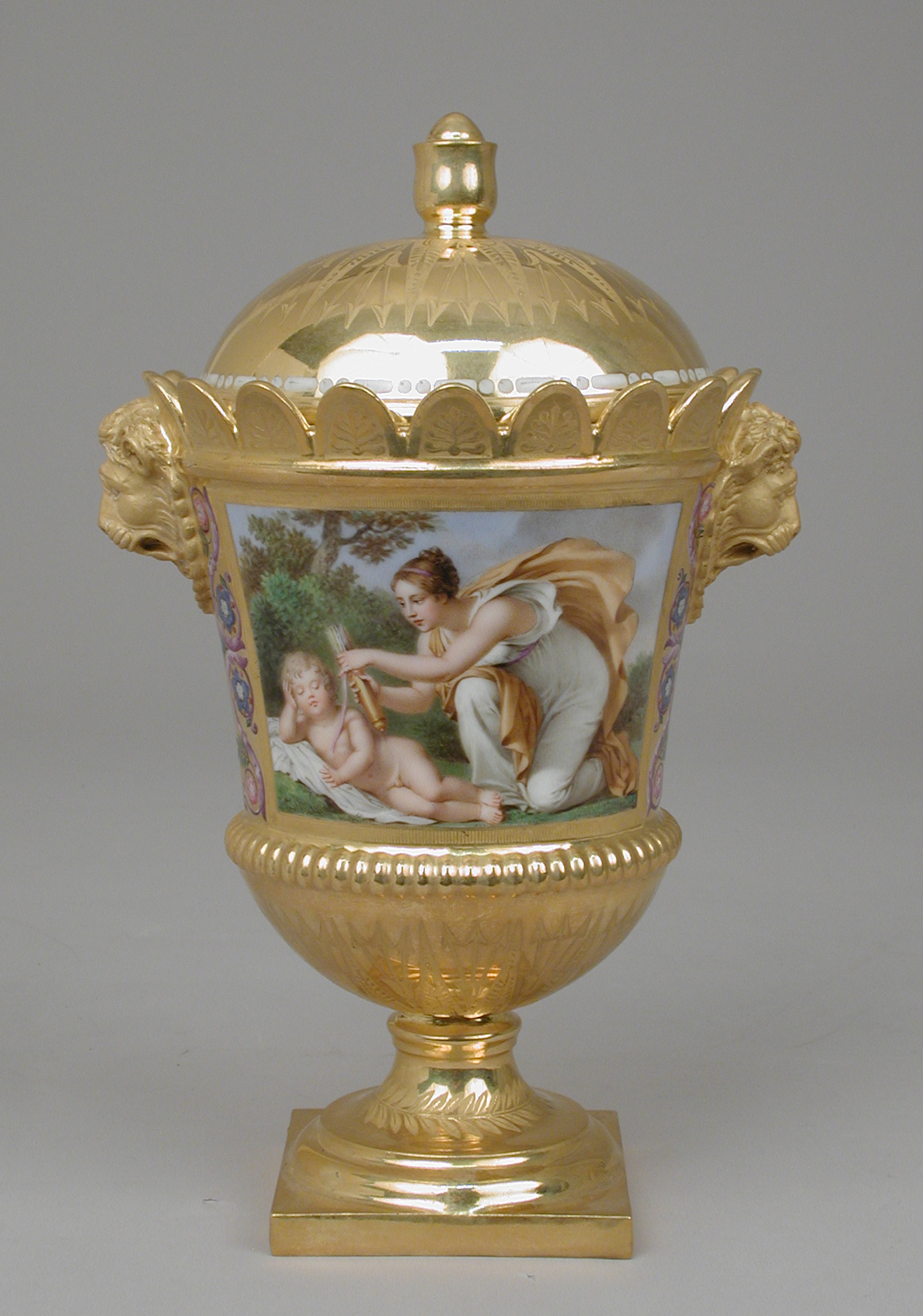
Sugar bowl with cover, part of a breakfast service (déjeuner); 1813; hard-paste porcelain; height: 21 cm; Metropolitan Museum of Art

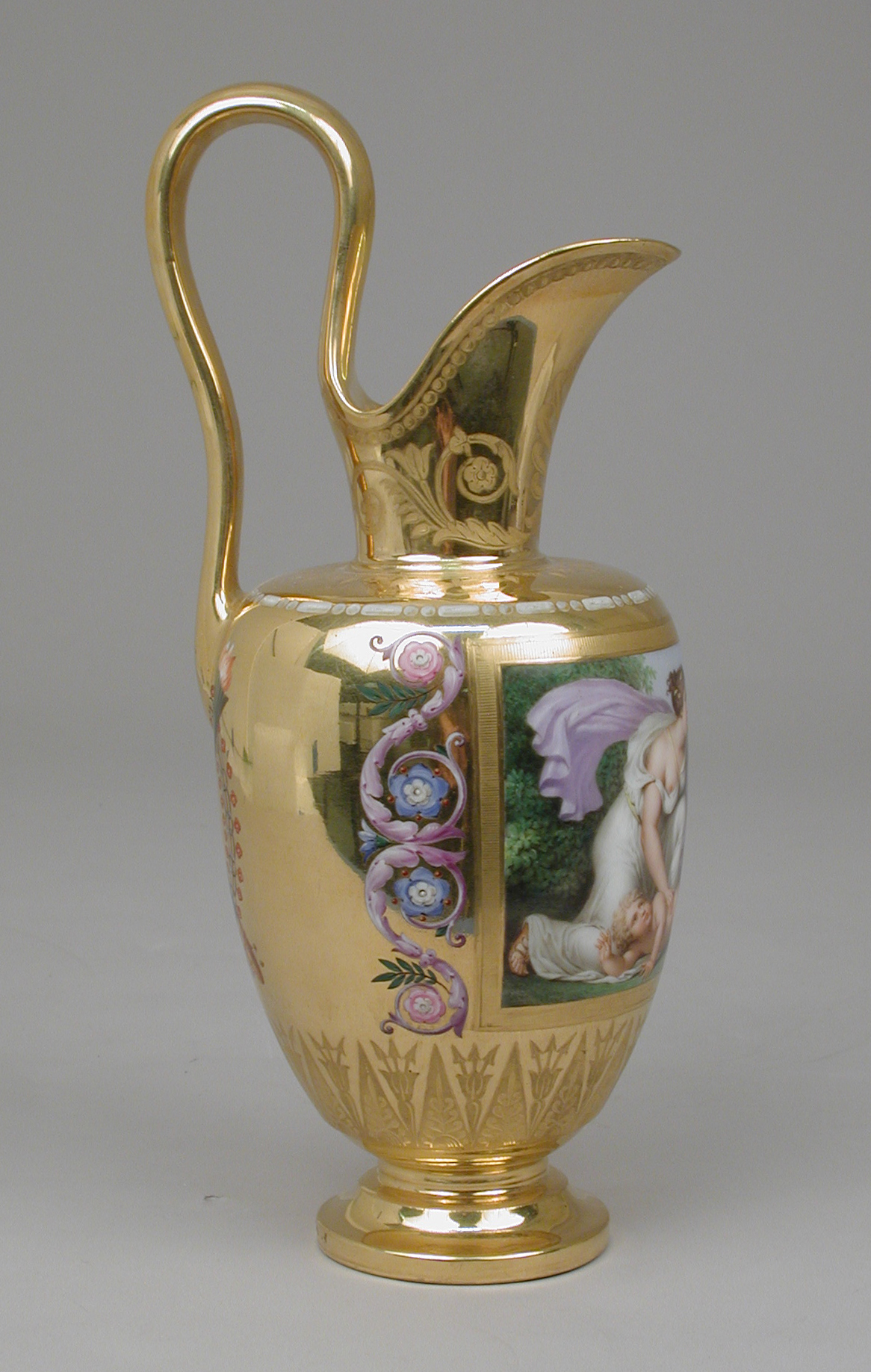
Milk jug (pot à lait Étrusque), part of a breakfast service (déjeuner); 1813; hard-paste porcelain; height (with handle): 21.3 cm; Metropolitan Museum of Art

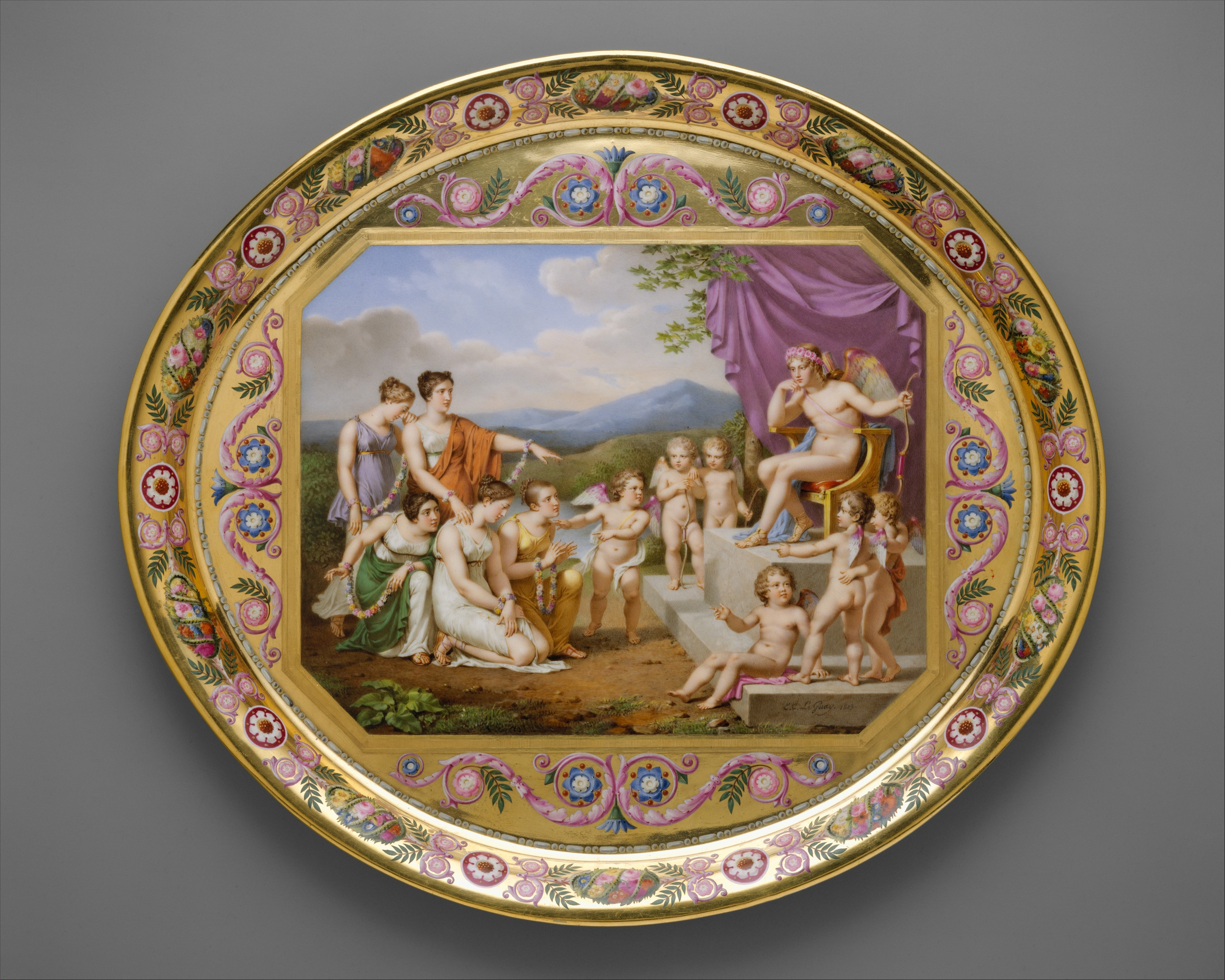
Tray (plateau), part of a breakfast service (déjeuner); 1813; hard-paste porcelain; 2.5 x 37.5 x 33.3 cm; Metropolitan Museum of Art

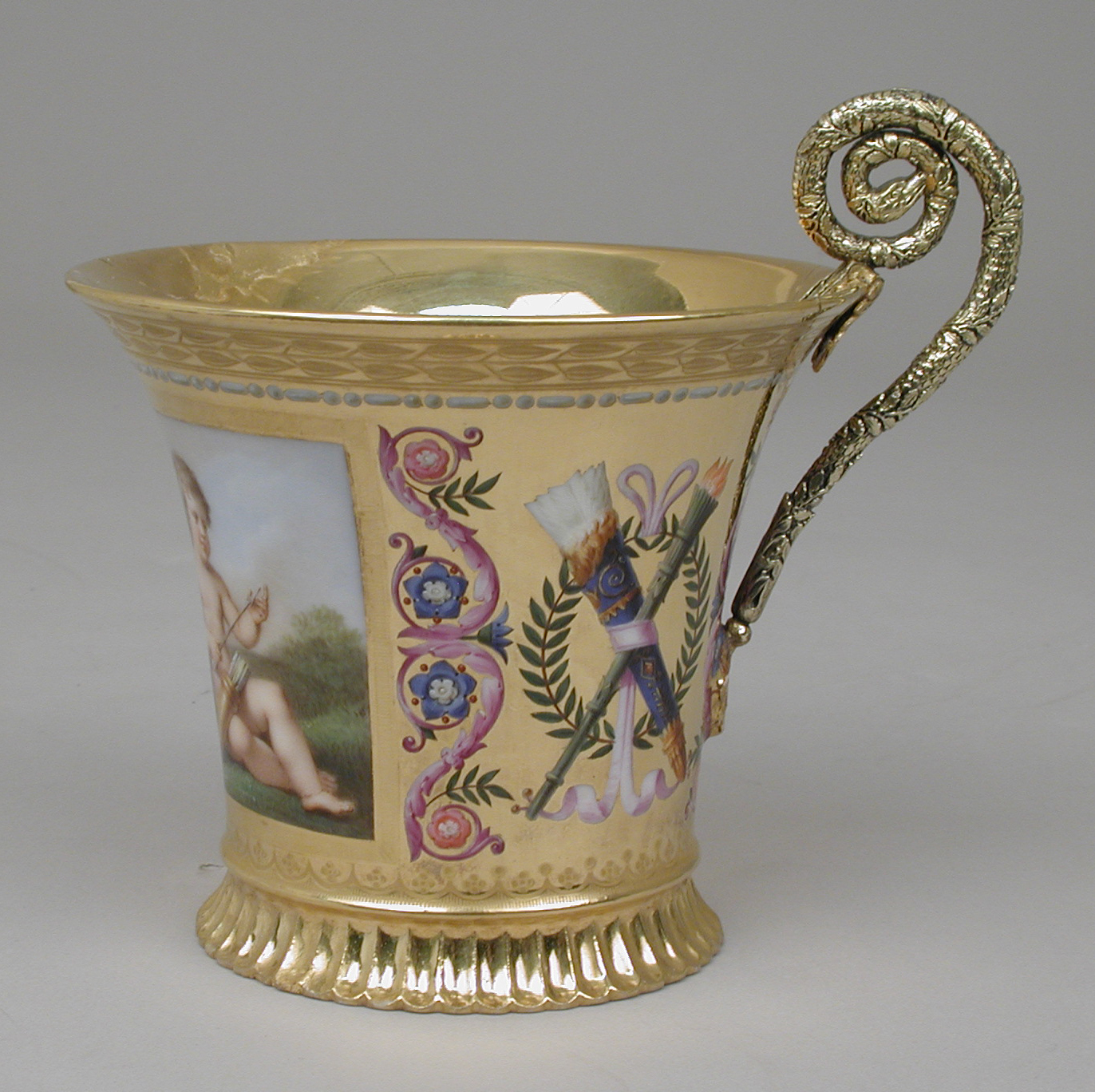
Cup (tasse Jasmin), part of a breakfast service (déjeuner); 1813; hard-paste porcelain and silver gilt; height: 11.3 cm; Metropolitan Museum of Art

== Fashion ==
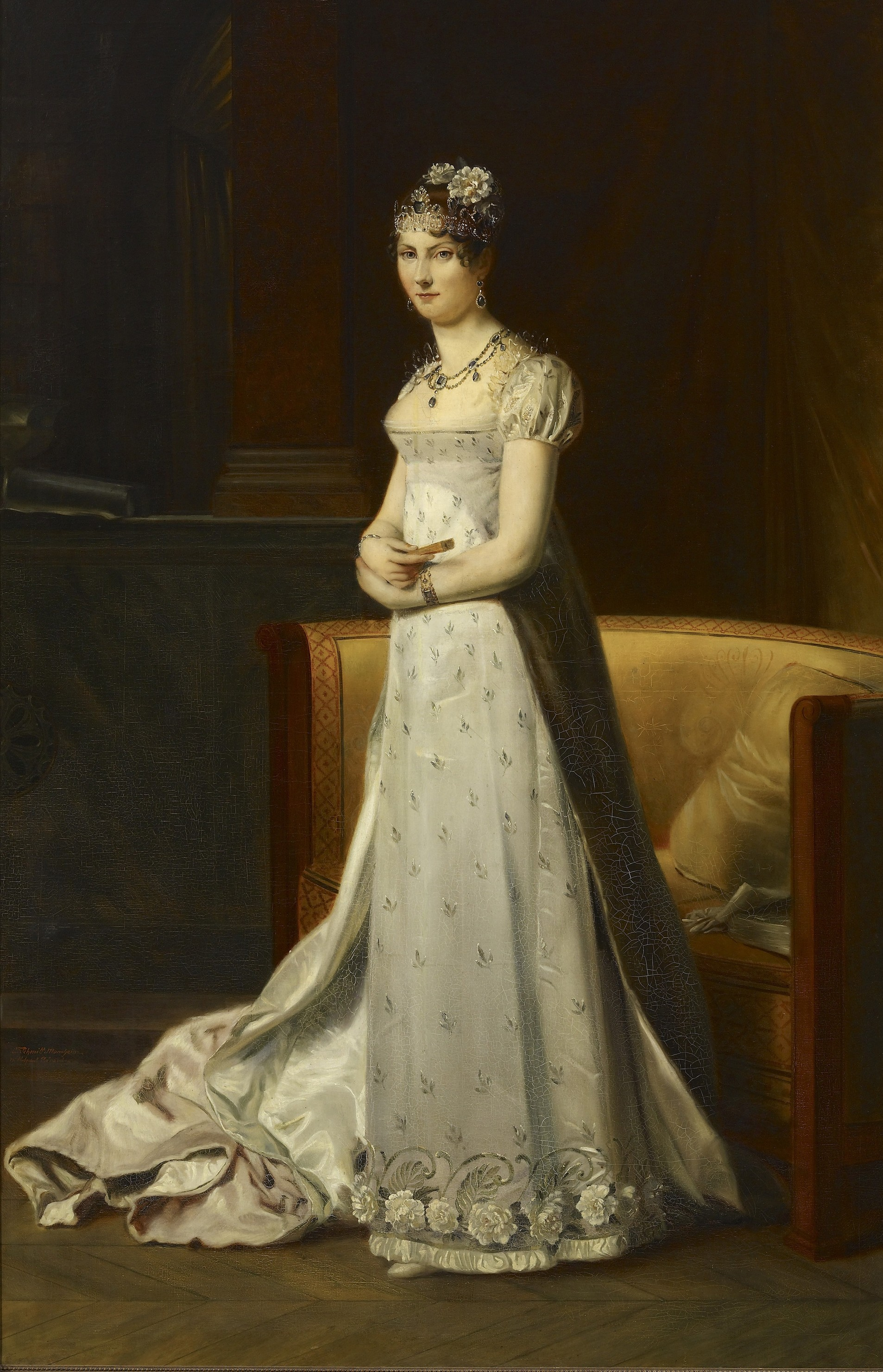
The Empire silhouette of Stéphanie de Beauharnais

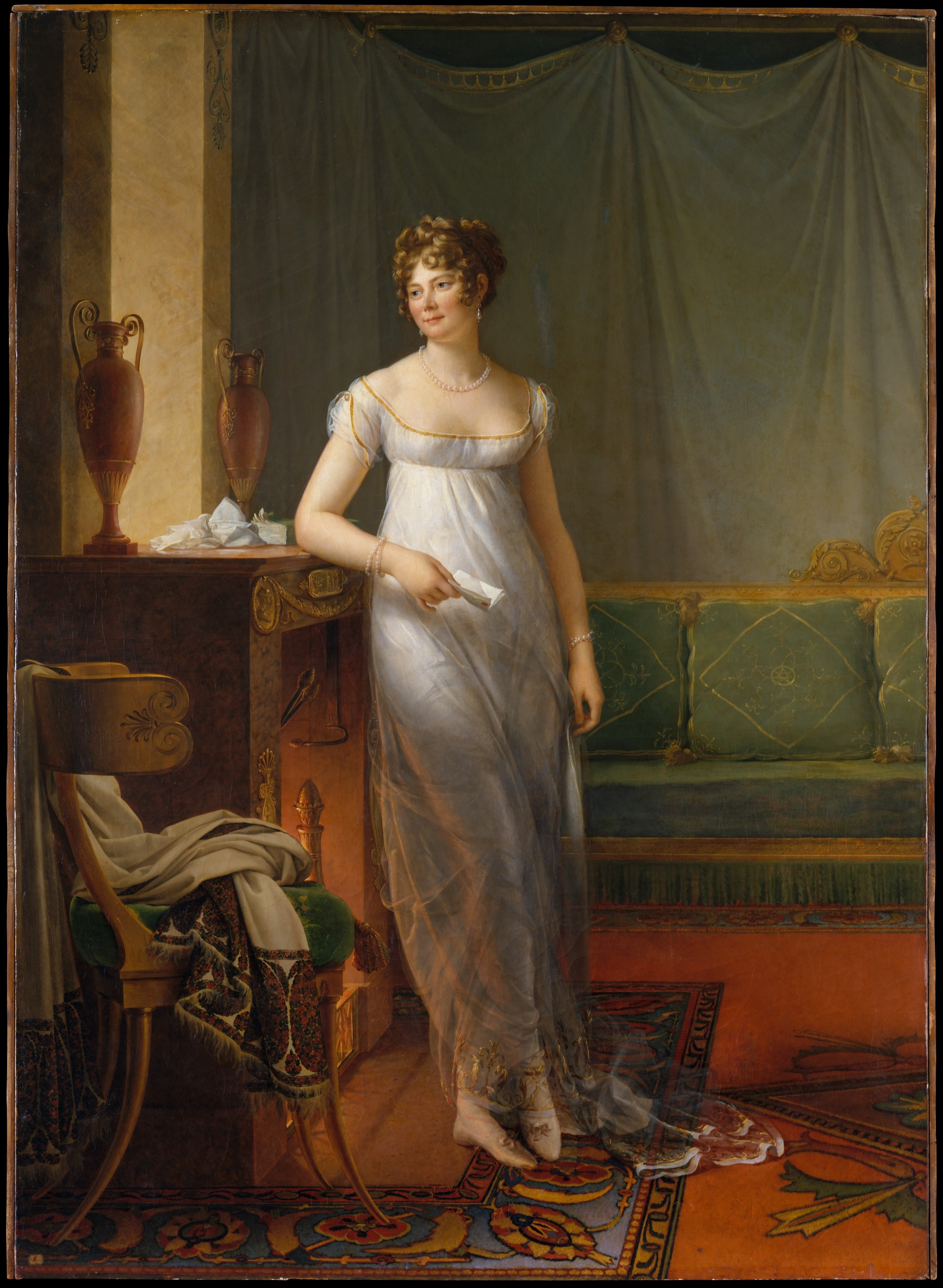
Portrait of Madame Charles Maurice de Talleyrand-Périgord, from circa 1804

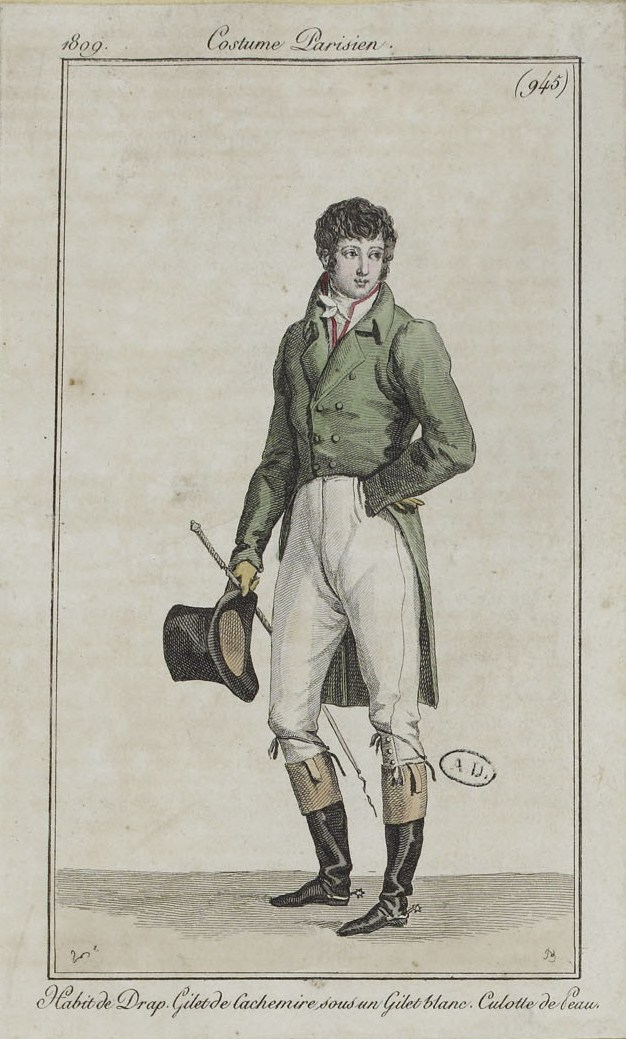
1809 illustration which shows how male Empire fashion looks like, from Journal des dames et des modes

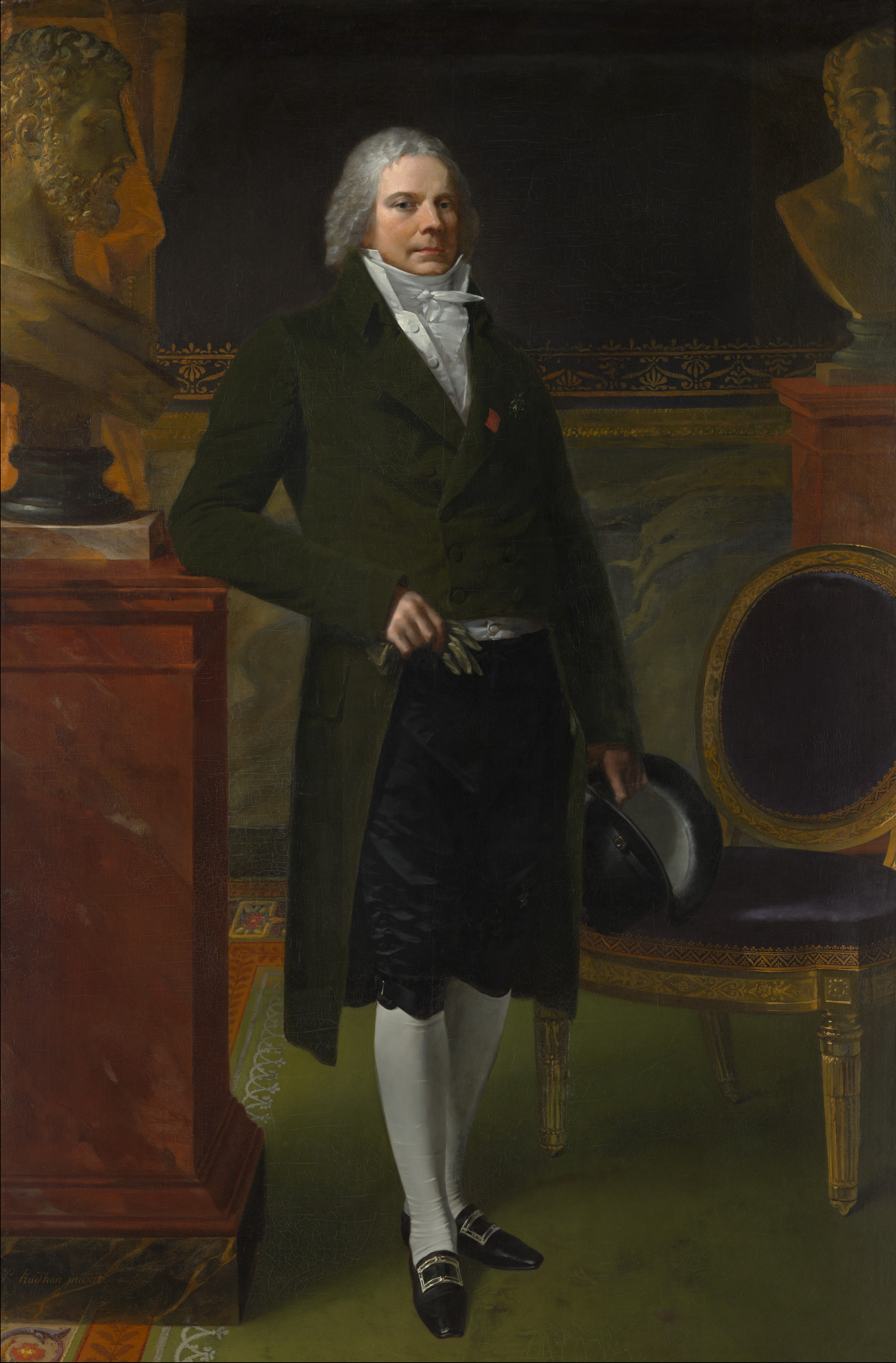
Portrait of Charles Maurice de Talleyrand-Périgord, from 1817

== See also ==
- American Empire style
- Chariot clock
- Empire silhouette
- French Empire mantel clock
- Indies Empire style
- Lighthouse clock
- Lyre arm
- Neoclassicism in France
- Neoclassical architecture in Milan
- Neo-Grec, the late Greek revival style architecture
- Palace of Fontainebleau
- Second Empire (architecture)
