= Lignereux =

French art company

- Founded: 1787
- Founder: Martin-Eloy Lignereux
- Key people: Gonzague Mézin (Director)
- Products: Decorative arts; Luxury
- Website: www.lignereux.com

Lignereux is a French company, founded in 1787 by Martin-Eloy Lignereux, which produces objets d'art. Established in Paris and London, Lignereux plays a major role in decorative arts. Lignereux makes objects which are intended for art collectors. In 2015 Lignereux began to produce new objects, decorated by contemporary artists and craftspeople.

== History ==
=== 18th and 19th centuries ===
Lignereux was founded by the marchand-mercier Martin-Eloy Lignereux, who formed a partnership with Dominique Daguerre in 1787. Their firm specialised in making objets d'art and luxury decorative items, and was celebrated throughout Europe. With boutiques in Paris and London, and exclusive deals with the porcelain manufactures Sèvres and Wedgwood—being the only retailer to sell Wedgwood porcelain in Paris from 1787, and the only one to sell Sèvres porcelain in London from the 1790s—Lignereux became a destination for art collectors at the time.

In August 1789, Queen Marie-Antoinette entrusted Lignereux and Daguerre with her personal collection of objets d'art, in order to protect them from potential vandalism.

The Parisian boutique, directed by Martin-Eloy Lignereux, became a tourist attraction, visited by rich foreigners who stayed in the French capital. A secret note from the Prefect of Police states in 1807 that “in peacetime, the maison of Daguerre and Lignereux turned over between 1,500,000 and 200,000,000 francs with foreign countries.”

After Daguerre's death in 1796, Martin-Eloy Lignereux continued to develop his business as a creator of art objects. The best Parisian artists and craftsmen were called upon by the company to imagine furniture and objects “d’un goût nouveau” ("for a new taste"). In 1802 and 1803 Lignereux was awarded a gold medal at the Exposition des Produits de l'Industrie Française.

Maison Lignereux survived the French revolution and other historical event by adapting and anticipating trends in the decorative arts.

In 1804, the company ceased to operate when an ill Lignereux yielded his stock to bronze-maker Pierre-Philippe Thomire. Lignereux himself died five years later.

== Operations ==
In the 18th century, Maison Lignereux was notable for having boutiques located in both Paris and London. This dual establishment reflected a key aspect of the Lignereux style, the unusual blend of French and English taste.

=== Attributes ===
Maison Lignereux's products were the result of a use of high quality materials, the collaboration of various artists, and a fusion of disparate cultures.

Bronze and exotic woods are ever-present in Lignereux's 18th and 19th century pieces, often combined with marble, porcelain, and pietra dura. Several motifs appear like signatures, such as the octagon, the bamboo, dragons with open wings, the torch, sphinxes, griffins, lion feet with coiling lines.

There are several recurring motifs which appear in Lignereux's designs. These include: octagons, bamboo, dragons with open wings, flaming torches, sphinxes, griffons, and paw feet.

== Clientele ==
=== Kings and queens ===
Lignereux has always attracted a royal and imperial clientele. Louis XVI and Marie-Antoinette, the King and Queen of Naples (Ferdinand I of the Two Sicilies), Czar Paul I of Russia, the Prince of Wales (future King George IV), Emperor Napoleon, and his wife Joséphine de Beauharnais, are among Lignereux's past clients.^{[12]}

=== Reputation ===
In the 20th and 21st centuries, Lignereux objects and furniture have been acquired by or belong to major art collectors, including:

- Moïse de Camondo,
- Alexis von Rosenberg, Baron de Redé,
- Professor Guy Ledoux-Lebard,
- Baron Fould-Springer, Nathaniel de Rothschild
- Edmond Safra.

=== Today ===
Some historical creations of maison Lignereux are still part of important private art collections. Other pieces either created, preserved or sold by maison Lignereux in the 18th and 19th century are exhibited today in public museums, in particular

- the Château de Versailles,
- the Metropolitan Museum of Art,
- the Château de Malmaison,
- the Hermitage Museum,
- the Château de Fontainebleau,
- the Royal Collection, Uppark House,
- the Musée Nissim-de-Camondo,
- the Rijksmuseum,
- the Victoria and Albert Museum,
- Woburn Abbey.

== See also ==
- Marchand-mercier
- Pierre-Philippe Thomire
- Dominique Daguerre
- Adam Weisweiler
