= Martin-Eloy Lignereux =

Late French artist

- Born: 1751; Cuvilly, France
- Died: 1809 (aged 57–58)
- Other name: Martin-Eloi
- Occupation: Marchand-mercier or decorative arts dealer
- Known for: Founded art house Lignereux

Martin-Eloy Lignereux also spelled Martin-Eloi (1751-1809) was a French marchand-mercier or decorative arts dealer. Active in Paris from 1781, he founded "la Maison Lignereux". Lignereux was popular among the upper echelons of society both at home and abroad in his own lifetime, furnishing many stately homes and aristocratic residences throughout Europe.

== Biography ==
=== Early life ===
Martin-Eloy Lignereux was born November 1751 in Cuvilly. At the age of 29 Lignereux opened his own Parisian boutique as a marchand-mercier, located in rue Saint-Honoré. This became an influential outlet for luxury goods.

=== La Maison Daguerre & Lignereux ===
In April 1787 Lignereux formed a partnership with Dominique Daguerre. A jewellery dealer, Daguerre was looked upon as a trend-setter by Queen Marie-Antoinette.

Lignereux and Daguerre become exclusive Parisian retailers for fine china and porcelain creations of the Wedgwoodcompany. In 1789, Daguerre opened a shop in London, while Lignereux took direction of the Parisian boutique located at 85, rue St-Honoré. The London store played a key role in the furnishing and decoration of Carlton House and the Royal Pavilion of the Prince of Wales. The Manufacture de Sèvres chose Maison Daguerre & Lignereux as the sole retailer of Sèvres porcelains in London.

As was common at the time, Lignereux and Daguerre organised several auctions of their wares. At least two auction sales were set up by maison Lignereux, one at Christie’s in London in 1791 and the other in Paris in 1793.

=== Caretaker of Marie-Antoinette’s private collection ===
On 10 August 1789, Marie-Antoinette entrusted "Daguerre et Lignereux, marchands bijoutiers", with her personal collection of art, vases, and lacquer boxes. After the Queen’s execution, Lignereux handed this collection over the French state.

=== La Maison Lignereux ===
When Dominique Daguerre died in 1796, Lignereux was at the head of a robust and internationally known business. The luxury market in Paris suffered heavily following the French Revolution; commerce with Britain was prohibited (except during the Treaty of Amiens in 1802-1803), but the Maison Lignereux continued production.

Lignereux moved the Parisian boutique to newly fashionable areas: 2 rue Christine in 1795, then 44 rue Vivienne in 1800, finally to 44 rue Taitbout in 1804, and adapted his work to the current tastes. Under the French Consulate and the First Empire, the reputation of the house increased. In 1802 and in 1803, Lignereux was awarded the gold medal at the Exposition des Produits de l'Industrie Française. His shop was a major destination for art connoisseurs and becomes a tourist attraction for wealthy foreigners.

=== Legacy ===
Lignereux had one daughter, Adélaïde-Anne, born in 1782. In 1798, she married cabinetmaker François-Honoré-Georges Jacob, heir to the Jacob dynasty of carpenters and cabinetmakers. Sculptor Pierre-Philippe Thomire and architect-decorators Charles Percier and Pierre-François-Léonard Fontaine witnessed the wedding.

In 1804, an ill Martin-Eloy Lignereux gave his stock to Thomire. Lignereux died in 1809. In 2015, a company began trading under the name Lignereux, inspired by the historic company.

== Works ==
=== Trend-setter ===
Lignereux constantly sought ways of satisfying and surprising an ever-demanding clientele. From 1787 to 1804, the visual style of his creations continued to evolve. His early Louis XVI objects, influenced by "Anglomania" and the "Chinoiserie", gave way to creations inspired by Egyptian, Greek and Roman antiquity popular throughout the Directory, Consulate and First Empire.

=== Collaborations ===
Lignereux was at the heart of a network of artists and artisans, calling upon them to design and make, under his supervision, collections of decorative art and furniture. He collaborated with cabinetmaker Adam Weisweiler and sculptors François Rémond and Pierre-Philippe Thomire.

He built a strong relationship with Manufacture de Sèvres. In addition to the agreement in London in the 1790s, maison Lignereux acts as a retailer of Sèvres porcelain in Paris in 1800-1801 and from 1802 to 1804.

=== Clientele ===
Martin-Eloy Lignereux initially benefited from the customer base of Daguerre and, following his partner’s death, increased this prestigious clientele.

From 1787 to 1804, the most influent connoisseurs acquired objects or furniture from Lignereux. An incomplete list of Daguerre and Lignereux’s clients during the French Revolution is taken from the "Etats des débiteurs, émigrés, non émigrés ou condamnés, de la Société Daguerre et Lignereux". It comprises "M. Perregaux, M. Tolozan, M. d'Aumont Valentinois, les comtes d'Artois, d'Angivillers, de Dillon, de Villequier, le baron de Breteuil, les marquis de Balleroy, de Lusignan, de Polignac, les princes et princesses de Condé, de Lamballe, de Montmorency".

Other notable clients were Madame du Barry, the Prince of Wales (soon King George IV), Emperor Napoleon, Impress Joséphine de Beauharnais, "la Reine Hortense", Thomas 7th Earl of Elgin and 11th of Kincardine, Quentin Craufurd, Talleyrand, William Beckford, the Duke of Wellington, the Duke of Hamilton, George Wyndham, 3rd Earl of Egremont, John Russell, 6th Duke of Bedford, Czar Paul I of Russia, Louis Ier de Bourbon, Nikolaus II, Prince Esterházy, General Charles Moreau, Lady Elizabeth Foster, Charles Whitworth, 1st Earl Whitworth, Sir Harry Fetherstonhaugh.

== Tributes ==
In 1802 and again in 1803, Lignereux was awarded the gold medals at the Exposition des Produits de l'Industrie Française. The Gazette Nationale ou le Moniteur Universel newspaper described the award in 1802 as follows : "The furniture of 'Citoyen Lignereux' seem remarkable in elegance and richness, through the match of all parties, the choice of appropriate shapes for each piece's destination and finally, through the preciseness and finish of inside and outside work"; and in 1803 : "Lignereux, rue Vivienne, who earned a gold medal in Year IX [i.e. 1802]. Awarded subject: furniture. Motive: richness and elegance".

Several visitors have admired the splendour of the art objects and furniture offered at Lignereux’s:

- "On 8 March 1803 we visited the fine furniture boutiqueof Lignereux. It is a gathering of finest taste, charming clocks, many mirrors 'à la Psyché', tables, 'garnitures de salon'." (Diary of Madame de Cazenove d'Arlens).
- "Nothing can be more beautiful (…). All [objects] are in the richest and best taste." (Bertie Greatheed).
- "1796. Paris. Lignereux. beautiful furniture" (Earl of Malmesbury)

== See also ==
- Maison Lignereux
- marchand-mercier
- Dominique Daguerre
- Pierre-Philippe Thomire
