= François de Salverte =

French aristocrat, diplomat and writer (1872–1929)

François Baconnière de Salverte
- Born: 8 July 1872; Ozoir-la-Ferrière (Seine-et-Marne)
- Died: 16 November 1929 (aged 57); Luzarches (Val-d'Oise)
- Occupation: Non-fiction writer
- Title: Count
- Spouse(s): Marguerite Dupré, Countess de Salverte
- Parent(s): Georges Napoléon Baconière de Salverte; Marie Joséphine Charlotte Guyot d'Arlincourt
- Relatives: Eusèbe Baconière de Salverte (great-uncle)

Count François de Salverte (1872–1929) was a French aristocrat, diplomat and non-fiction writer about furniture design.

== Early life ==
François de Salverte was born into an aristocratic family in 1872. His father, Georges Napoléon Baconière de Salverte (1833–1899), was a senior lawyer at the Conseil d'Etat. His mother was Marie Joséphine Charlotte Guyot d'Arlincourt (1848–1912). His great-uncle, Eusèbe Baconière de Salverte, was a writer and politician.

He graduated from the Institut Catholique de Paris in 1893, with a degree in law.

== Career ==
He was appointed as diplomatic attache at the French embassy in Constantinople in 1903.

He wrote Les Ébénistes du XVIIIe siècle leurs oeuvres et leurs marques in 1927. Two years later, in July 1929, he gifted a copy to Queen consort Mary of Teck. The book was republished seven times. It was the first book about French ébénistes ever published.

He published articles about furniture design in La Revue de l'art ancien et moderne. In 1928, he gave a lecture about Martin Carlin and Georges Jacob, two ébénistes, at a conference organised by the Société de l'Histoire de l'Art Français.

Shortly before his death, he started writing Le Meuble français d'après les ornemanistes de 1660 à 1789. The book was finished by Gustave Macon, Assistant to Henri d'Orléans, Duke of Aumale and Archivist at the Château de Chantilly, with a foreword written by his widow. In the book, he stressed that he valued French furniture design during the Ancien Régime, and saw furniture designed after the French Revolution, including during the Bourbon Restoration, as "decadent."

== Personal life ==
He married Marguerite Dupré on 28 June 1900 in Paris 8th. She became styled as Countess de Salverte.

== Death ==
He died in 1929 at the castle of Saint-Thaurin.

== Bibliography ==
- Les Ébénistes du XVIIIe siècle. Leurs œuvres et leurs marques. (Paris : G. Van Oest, 1923).
- Documents inédits sur les ébénistes Martin Carlin et Georges Jacob. Communication faite à la Société de l'Histoire de l'Art français, le 6 avril 1928. (Paris : Daupeley-Gouverneur, 1929).
- Le Meuble français d'après les ornemanistes de 1660 à 1789. (foreword by Marguerite Du Pré, Countess de Salverte; Paris : G. Van Oest, 1930).
