= François Rémond =

French master bronzesmith and gilder (1747–1812)

- Born: c. 1747; Paris, France
- Died: 1812; Paris, France
- Occupation: Master metalworker

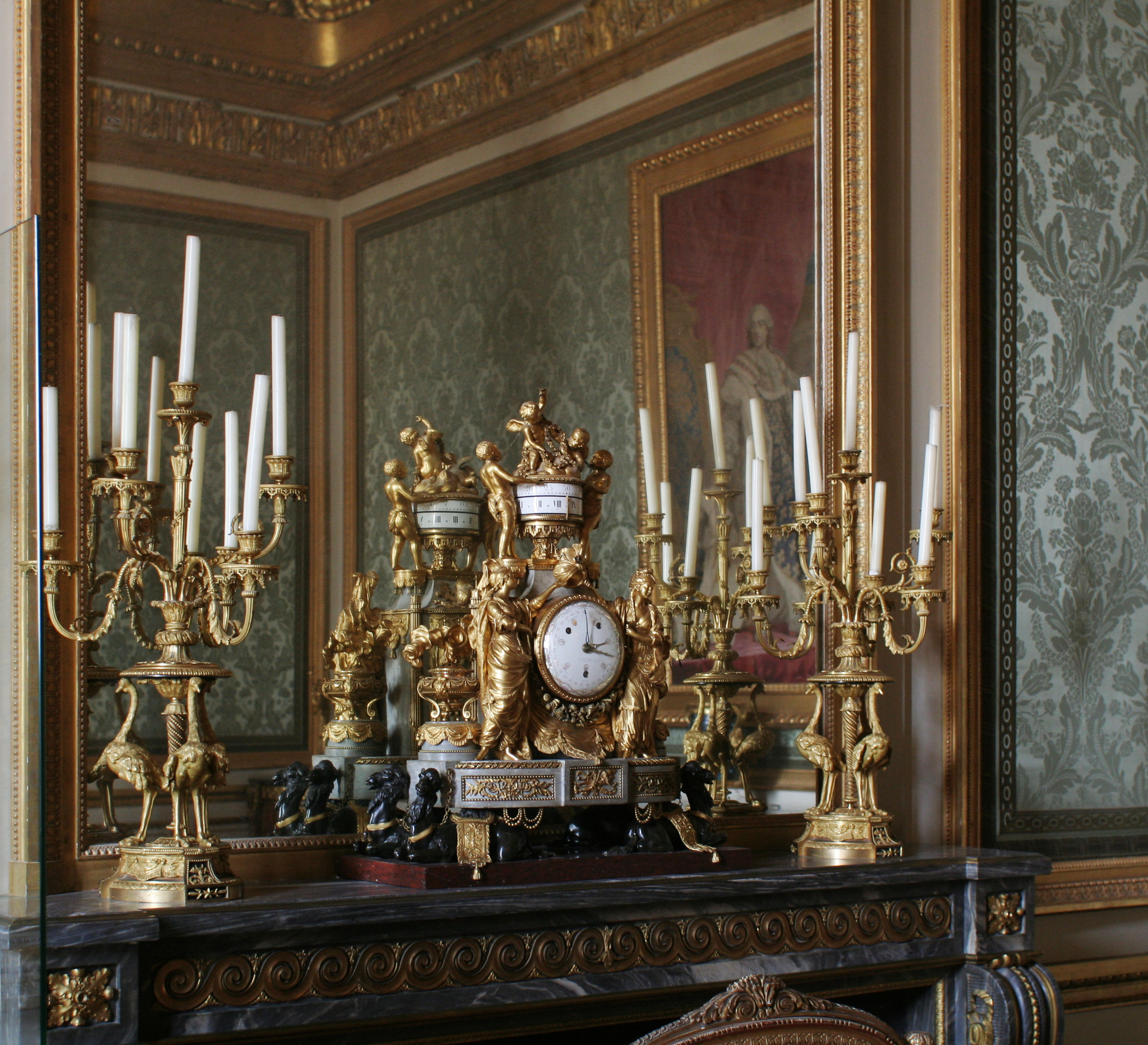
Palace of Versailles, Salon des Nobles. Large "camel" pendulum clock and "crane" candelabras

François Rémond (c. 1747 – 1812) was a French master metalworker and bronze gilder who achieved renown in his day, and whose work is still greatly valued. It included stand-alone works such as candelabras, the decorative casings for clocks and bronze ornamentation for the elaborate furniture made for the elite at the time.

== Life ==
François Rémond was born in Paris about 1747, and started his apprenticeship in 1763. In 1774, he became a master in the bronze gilders' guild. He was a prolific worker. He became one of the best regarded of bronze gilders, carvers and casters of his time, producing work that was much in demand from the royal court. He undertook many commissions from the prominent marchand-mercier Dominique Daguerre. He created works in the Turkish style, then in vogue, for the royal family of Louis XVI (1754–1793).

Rémond made urns, firedogs and candelabras. He worked with the bronze caster Pierre Gouthière on some of his larger works before 1788, when Gouthière went bankrupt.

Both Rémond and Gouthière were known for their ability to create matt and burnished gilding. They would make elaborate gilt-bronze mounts for clocks, furniture or statuary that incorporated imaginary or rare creatures such as camels and ostriches. Rémond also made ornaments and figures for clockmakers and furniture mounts for ébénistes. He provided bronze ornamentation for the furniture-maker Jean Henri Riesener (1734–1806).

In August 1774 the cabinet-maker David Roentgen, based in the town of Neuwied on the lower Rhine, met Rémond in Paris. This was to be the start of a long and productive relationship between the two men. In the future, most of Roentgen's pieces were ornamented with bronze from Paris, including mounts by Rémond and sometimes sculptural work from artists such as Louis-Simon Boizot. Roentgen sold a rolltop desk to Catherine the Great in April 1786, decorated in bronze, with a chiming clock. The clock incorporates a bronze sculpture and bronze ornamentation made with great skill and artistry by Rémond. In a set of five cabinets that Roentgen made for Catherine between 1786 and 1788 Rémond made the arabesque ornaments on the door panels and bronze medallions of the philosophers Cicero and Plato.

An example of his work is an elaborate Neoclassical chimney-piece held by the Metropolitan Museum of Art, made in 1784 after a design by François-Joseph Bélanger (1744–1818), with bronze figures representing satyresses sculpted by Jean-Joseph Foucou (1739–1815). It was commissioned for the Grand Salon Ovale of the Hôtel Thelusson in Paris. The cheminée is made of Verde di Levanto marble, patinated bronze and gilt bronze. Rémond cast the bronze figures and made the decoration. The frieze is entirely decorated with repeating gilt-bronze ornament.

François Rémond died in Paris in 1812.
