= François-Honoré-Georges Jacob-Desmalter =

Furniture workshop in Paris

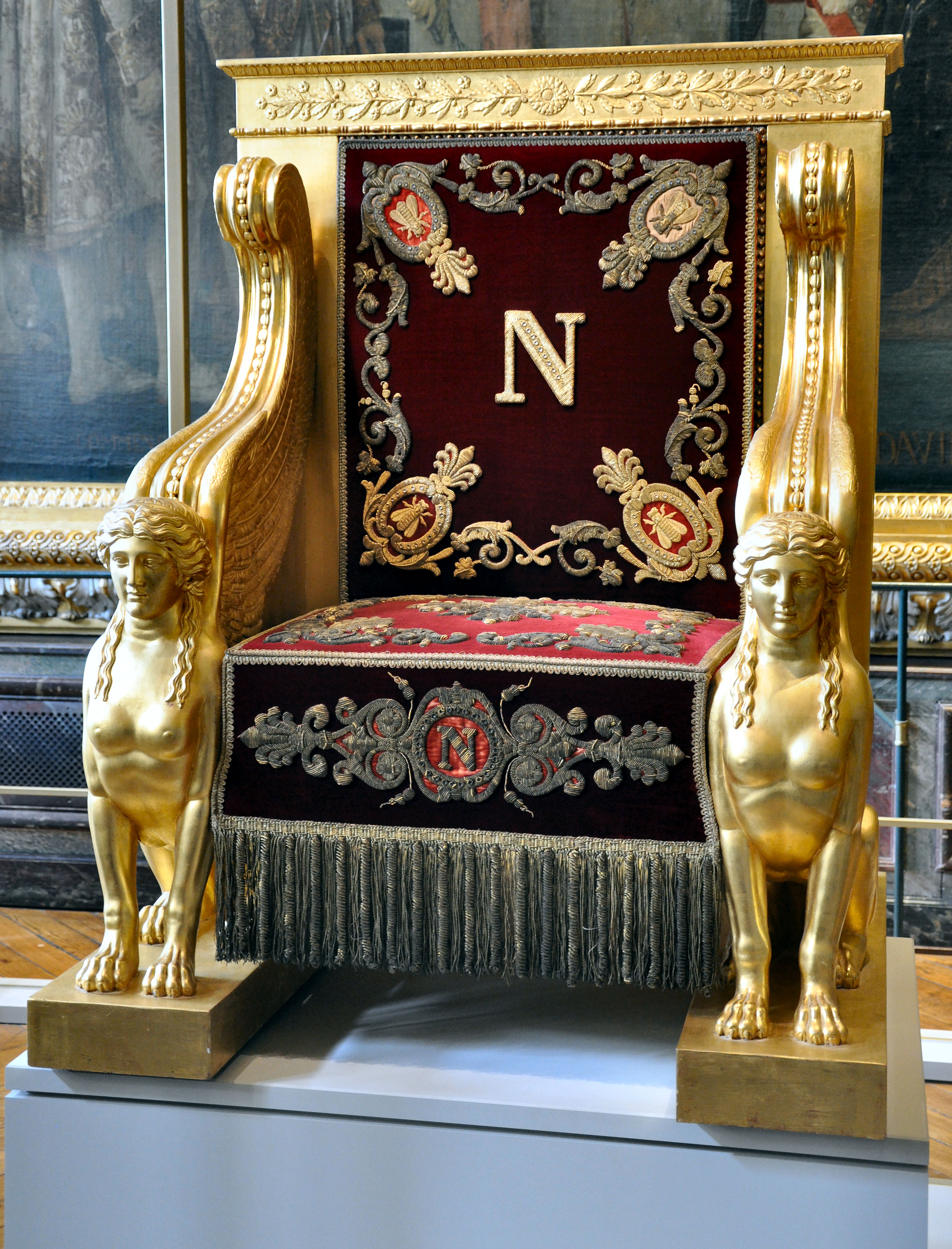
Throne for Napoleon to preside over the Senate, 1804

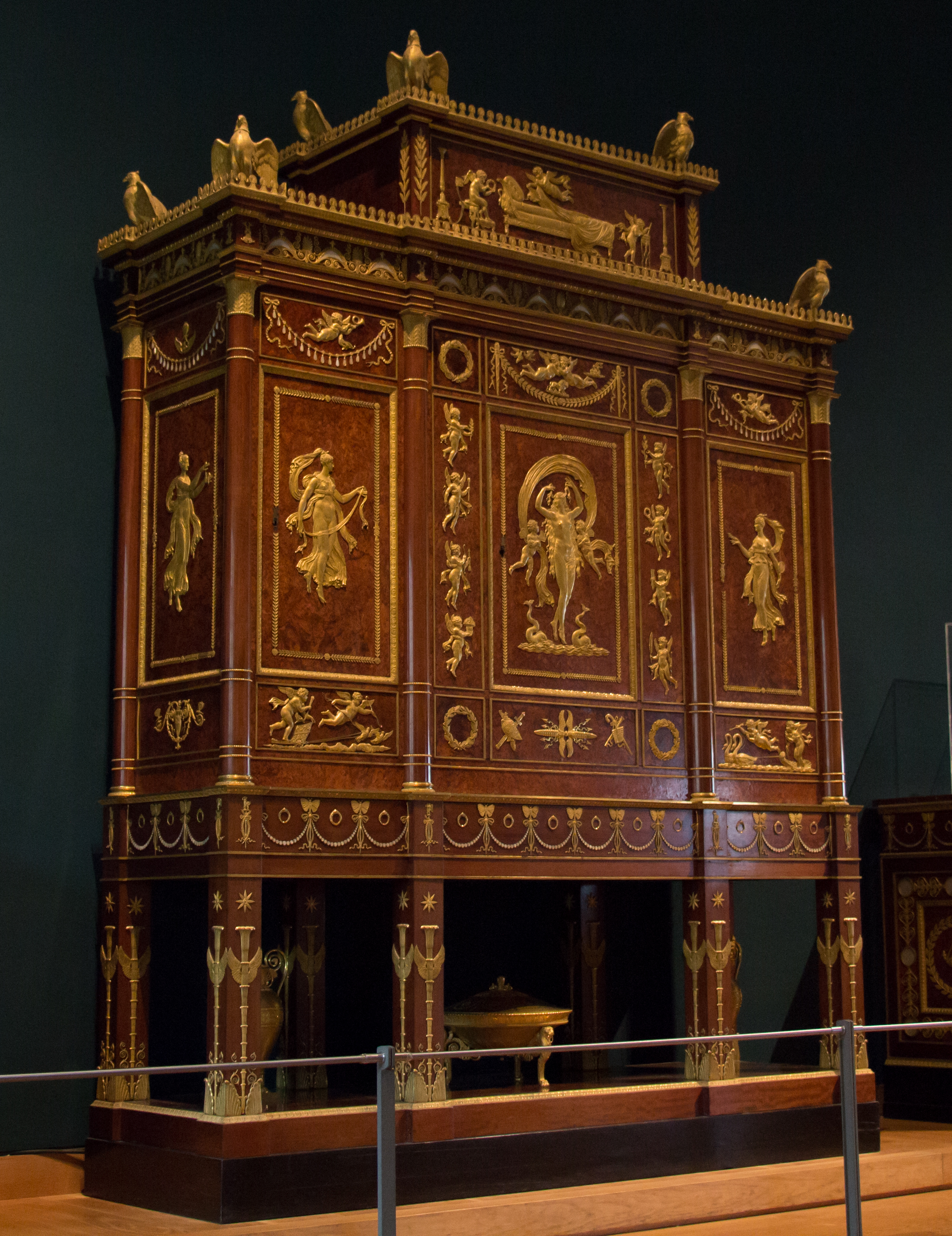
Jewel-cabinet, 1809 (Musée du Louvre)

François-Honoré-Georges Jacob-Desmalter (1770–1841) oversaw one of the most successful and influential furniture workshops in Paris, from 1796 to 1825. The son of Georges Jacob, an outstanding chairmaker who worked in the Louis XVI style and Directoire styles of the earlier phase of Neoclassicism and executed many royal commissions, Jacob-Desmalter, in partnership with his older brother, assumed the family workshop in 1796. Freed from the Parisian guild restrictions of the Ancien Régime, the workshop was now able to produce veneered case-pieces (ébénisterie) in addition to turned and carved seat furniture (menuiserie). When his brother died, Jacob-Desmalter drew his father from retirement and began to develop one of the largest furniture workshops in Napoleonic Paris.

Furniture in the Empire style produced by the firm of Jacob-Desmalter et Cie ("and Company") in rue Meslée, Paris, mainly employed mahogany veneers with gilt-bronze mounts. Seat furniture forms, of mahogany when they were not painted or gilded, derived inspiration from seats and thrones of Antiquity, recognizable in details from bas-reliefs and on Greek vases. Jacob-Desmalter, principal supplier of furniture to the Emperor, also received commissions from Pauline Borghese, Napoleon's sister in Rome, and the Empresses Joséphine and Marie Louise, for whom he supplied numerous pieces for the Château de Malmaison, the Château de Compiègne, the Tuileries Palace, and other imperial residences. Important commissions included a magnificent cradle built for the infant King of Rome, and the most expensive single item, the jewel cabinet for the Empress, delivered in 1809 for the Empress Joséphine's state bedroom in the Tuileries (soon to be used by Marie-Louise). It was designed by the architect Charles Percier and embellished with gilt-bronze plaques: the central one, according to its original description, depicts the "Birth of the Queen of the Earth, to whom Cupids and Goddesses hasten with their Offerings" by the Empire's most eminent bronzier, Pierre-Philippe Thomire, modelled by Antoine-Denis Chaudet.

Greatly dependent on orders from Napoleon, the firm went bankrupt in 1813, when Imperial debts mounted during the last phase of the Napoleonic Empire. Jacob-Desmalter, however, managed to resurrect the company, and commissions revived after 1815. He continued to run it until his son, Georges-Alphonse, succeeded him in 1825.
