= Adam Weisweiler =

French cabinetmaker

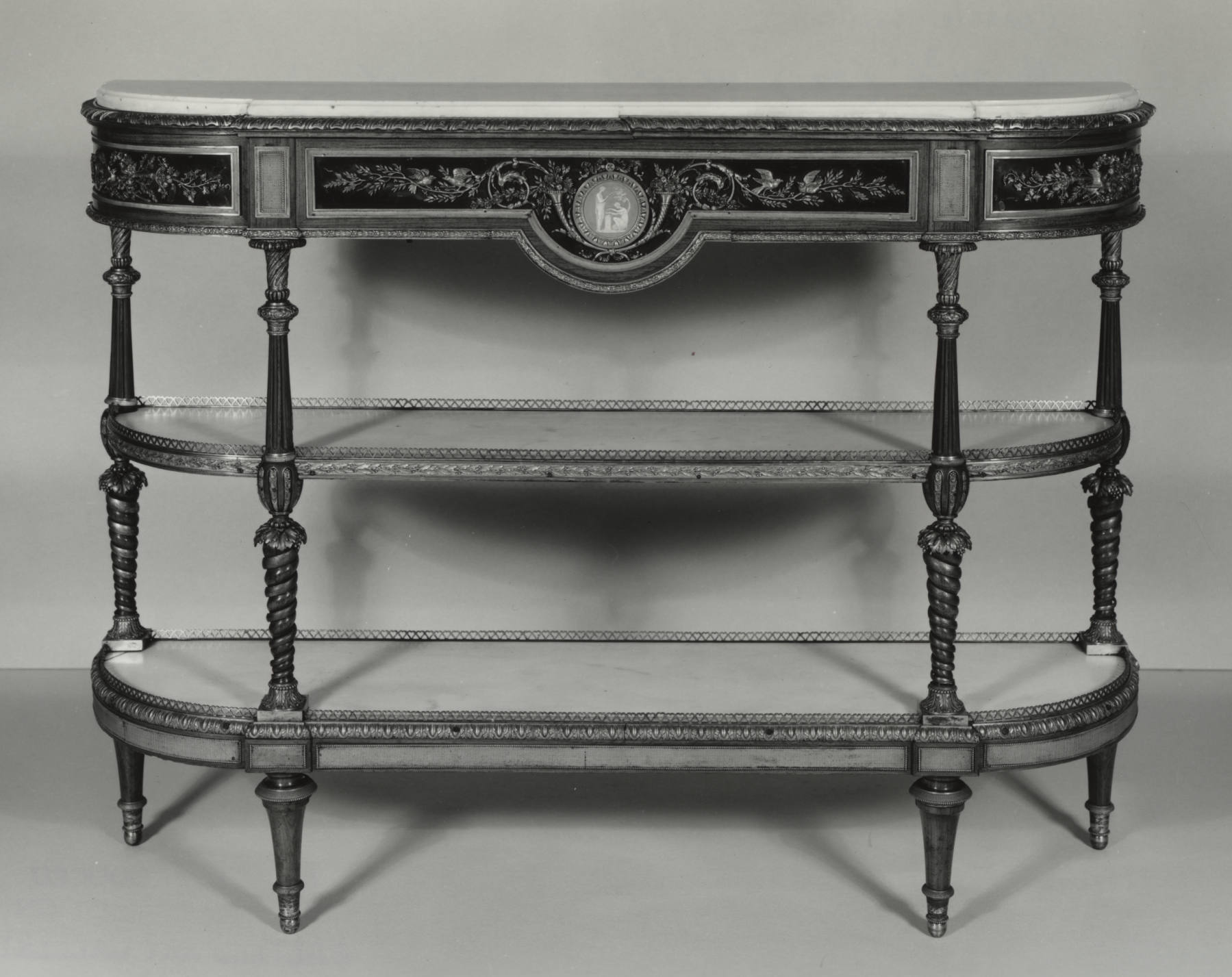
An Adam Weisweiler console table, mounted with jasperware medalions manufactured by Josiah Wedgwood, c. 1786 in the Walters Art Museum

Adam Weisweiler (c. 1750 – after 1810) was a pre-eminent French master cabinetmaker (ébéniste) in the Louis XVI period, working in Paris.

Weisweiler is said to have been born at Neuwied-am-Rhein and to have received his early training in David Roentgen's workshop. He was in Paris before 1777, when he married Barbe Conte, and was received maître 26 March 1778. Thus all pieces bearing his stamp post-date that event.

Weisweiler worked notably for the marchands-merciers, who alone could supply him with the Japanese lacquer panels that, combined with ebony and refined gilt-bronze, characterise some of his finest work. Through Dominique Daguerre he supplied the writing table of steel, lacquer and ebony and gilt-bronze for Marie Antoinette at the château de Saint-Cloud in 1784. Through Daguerre again he provided furniture for the Prince Regent (later George IV) at Carlton House, London. Weisweiler specialised in small refined pieces, with fine lines, delicate legs with light interlaced stretchers, and gilt-bronze low-relief plaques and mounts, some provided to him by Pierre Gouthière through Daguerre, often decorated with panels of Japanese lacquer and Sèvres porcelain plaques, even panels of pietra dura. Pictorial marquetry is not found in his output. Alvar González-Palacios, in demonstrating that the Weisweiler lacquer suite consisting of a pair of drop-front secretary desks and a commode, from the Wrightsman collection now at the Metropolitan Museum, had been sold by Daguerre c. 1790 for the king of Naples' cabinet at Caserta, observes that it would be more accurate to say that they are in the manner of Daguerre rather than that they are typical of Weisweiler.

Unlike other luxury furniture makers of the Ancien Régime, Weisweiler weathered the Revolution. In 1810 he was supplying Queen Hortense and collaborating with Pierre-Philippe Thomire. After his retirement, his son Jean Weisweiler continued the workshop until 1844.

== Mark ==
The letters "A.V." incised on the bottom tray of a Louis XVI style workbench are attributed to Weisweiler.

== Collection ==
Secrétaire

- Secrétaire, 1785-1820, V&A, UK

== See also ==
- Louis XVI furniture
