= Jean-François Clouet =

French chemist (1751-1801)

Jean-François Clouet (French pronunciation: [ʒɑ̃ fʁɑ̃swa kluɛ]; 11 November 1751 – 4 July 1801) was a French chemist and metallurgist. His notable works include the liquefaction of sulphur dioxide in collaboration with Gaspard Monge and the production of Damascus and cast steel.

Clouet was born in Singly, Ardennes, son of farmer Norbert and Marie-Jeanne Tayaut. Educated at Charleville and at the École du Génie at Mézières he travelled around the country before setting up a pottery workshop where he experimented with enamels. He gave this up in 1783 and became a teacher at the École du Génie where he began to collaborate with Gaspard Monge, conducting experiments on the composition of water, liquefaction of sulphur dioxide under low temperature and high pressure (in 1784) and on balloon flight. He took over Monge's position the next year and began to examine metallurgy, with experiments on siderite, and the manufacture of Damascus steel. He also examined the composition of Prussian Blue in 1791. After the French Revolution, in which he participated, in 1793, he was called by Jean-Nicolas Pache to improve metallurgy and worked at several places including the École Polytechnique and Conservatoire des Arts et Métier. He established the foundry at Daigny. In 1795 he claimed to have produced Damascus steel by the addition of diamonds to molten iron. This method of hardening steel was later replaced by graphite by others. He also found a way to cast steel by melting cast iron with chalk and charcoal. He was honoured at the Exposition des produits de l'industrie française of September 1798. He also began to make experiments on plant chemicals. Clouet was a friend of Claude Henri de Saint-Simon and became interested in reformism and Rousseanism. In 1799 he decided to move to Guiana where he wished to examined tropical plants. He died from a fever at Cayenne.

Some early biographers of Clouet have confounded him with two others Abbé Pierre-Romain Clouet (1748–1810), a librarian at the Ecole des Mines, and Jean-Baptiste-Paul-Antoine Clouet (1739–1816), who worked with Lavoisier.
