= Louis Delanois =

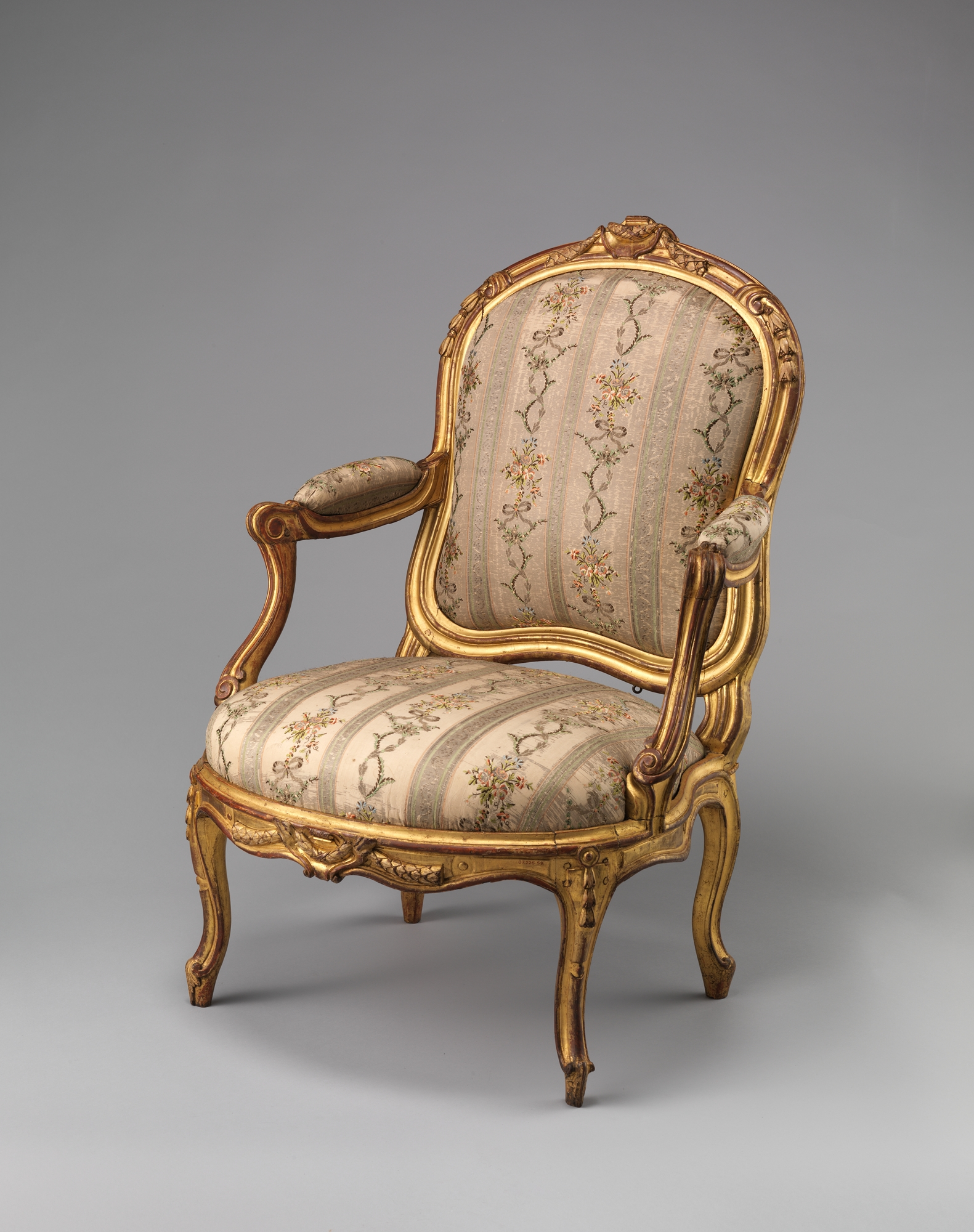
Louis Delanois, Armchair (Metropolitan Museum)

Louis Delanois (1731–1792) was a Parisian menuisier who specialized in seat furniture in the late Rococo taste and an advanced neoclassical taste. Among his notable patrons were mme du Barry, the comte d'Artois, brother of the king, Philippe, duc de Chartres and the duc de Condé. Foreigners like the king of Poland and the duke of Dorset also bought furniture from Delanois, whose manuscript account book survives in the Archives de la Seine. His attempts, after selling off his furniture business in 1777, to extend his business into the timber trade and property speculation, however, resulted in bankruptcy by 1789.

Georges Jacob may have been a journeyman for three years with Delanois throughout the 1760s.
