= Exposition des produits de l'industrie française =

French national exhibition, 1798 to 1849

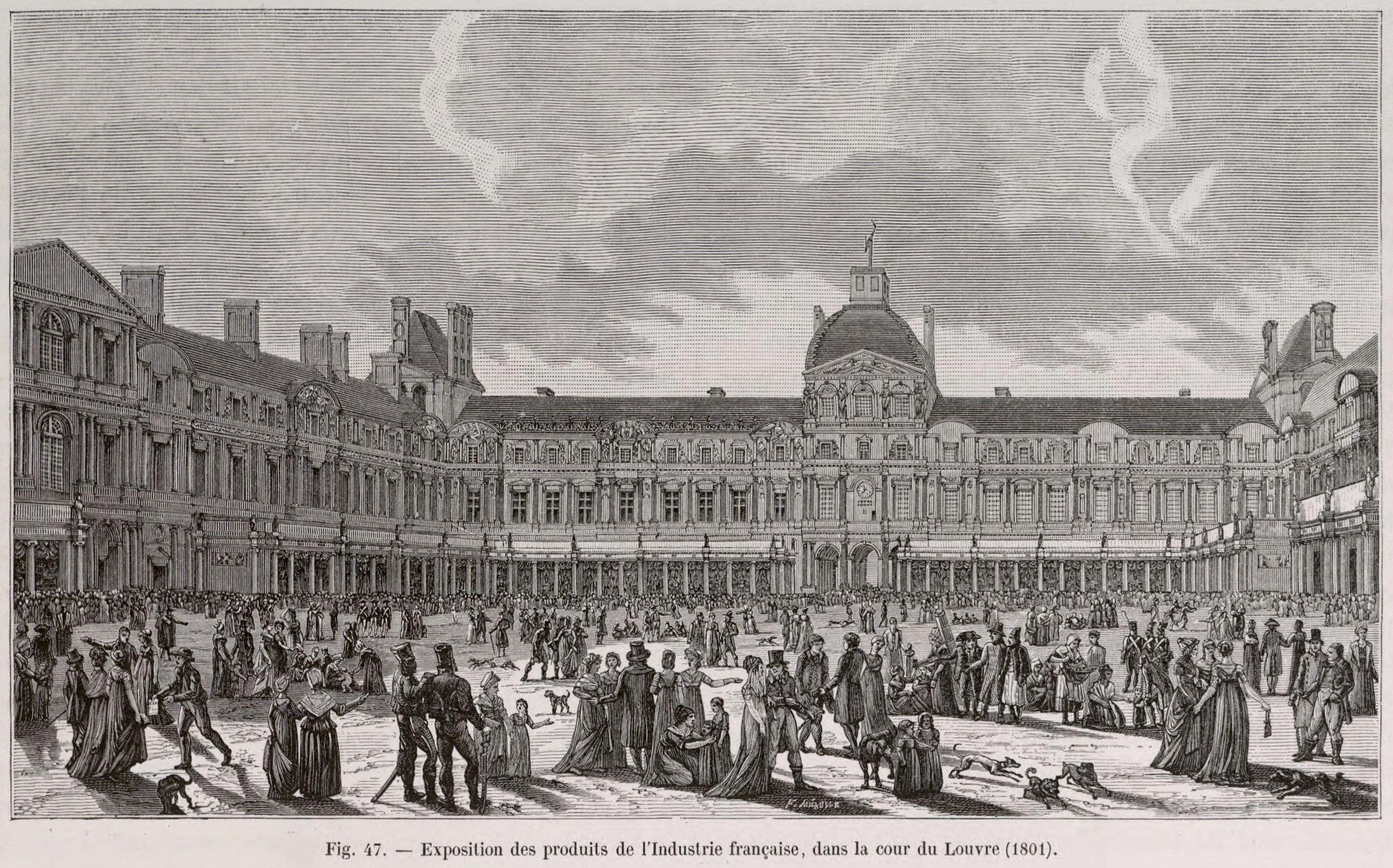
- Exposition des produits de l'industrie française, Court of the Louvre (1801)

Overview
- BIE-class: Unrecognized exposition
- Name: Exposition des produits de l'industrie française

Location
- Country: France
- City: Paris

Timeline
- Opening: 1798
- Closure: 1849

Specialized expositions

The Exposition des produits de l'industrie française (French pronunciation: [ɛkspozisjɔ̃ de pʁɔdɥi də lɛ̃dystʁi fʁɑ̃sɛːz]; transl. "Exhibition of Products of French Industry") was a public event organized in Paris, France, from 1798 to 1849. The purpose was "to offer a panorama of the productions of the various branches of industry with a view to emulation".

== Background ==
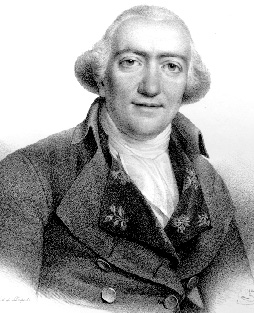
The 1st exposition was organized at the initiative of François de Neufchâteau

The Paris industrial expositions between 1798 and 1849 can trace their origins to the fairs that were held in several cities of Europe in the Middle Ages. After the start of the French Revolution of 1789–98 the authorities staged a series of festivals in Paris, starting with the Festival of the Federation on 14 July 1790 and followed by events such as the Festival of Law (1792), Festival of Reason (1793), Festival of the Supreme Being (1794), and Festival of the Foundation of the Republic (1796). These celebrations of the new republic helped to unite the people and win acceptance of the new order.

The Directory launched the first exposition at a time when France was engaged in external wars and was still in upheaval from the revolution. The idea of an industrial exposition emerged from discussions led by the Minister of the Interior François de Neufchâteau over how to celebrate the anniversary of the Republic's foundation. The Directory approved and on 9 Fructidor, Year VI (26 August 1798), François de Neufchâteau notified the government officials that an Exposition of the products of French industry would be held along with the 1 Vendémiaire VII (22 September 1798) anniversary celebration.

== French First Republic: 1st exposition (1798) ==
The first exposition was held at the Champ de Mars. The architect Jean-François Chalgrin, who later designed the Arc de Triomphe, undertook the hasty construction of a large circle of porticos surrounding a Temple of Industry. The temple would hold the objects of industries that the jury had selected. The official exposition took place during the five last days of the year VI (19–21 September 1798). The exposition opened on 19 September 1798 with a parade led by trumpeters and cavalry, with musicians, soldiers, heralds, manufacturers, the jury and politicians. There were 110 exclusively French exhibitors. Due to the short notice, there were relatively few exhibitors, all from Paris or the neighboring departments. There were further festivities and speeches on the fifth day, the last official day of the exposition. The exposition remained open until 10 Vendémiaire Year VII (1 October 1798).

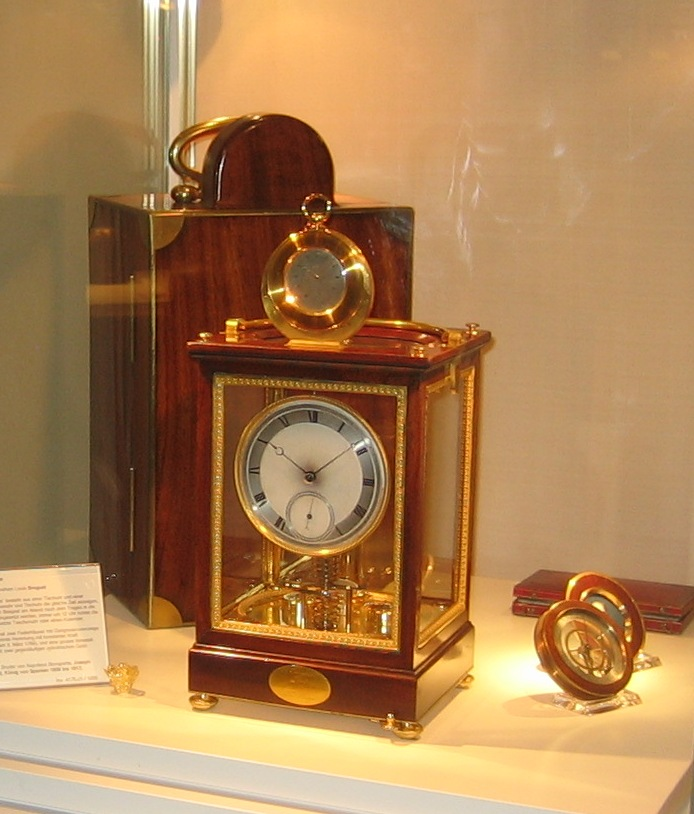
Clock and packet watch by Abraham-Louis Breguet

Exhibits included an instrument for cataract operations, paintings made from the plumes of exotic birds, a machine for extracting logs from rivers and a device that demonstrated the new metric system of meters, grams and liters. The jury was told to favour products that were comparable to those of British industry. Twelve exhibitors were given honorable distinctions. Thirteen received honourable mentions. Honorable distinctions included:

- Abraham-Louis Breguet: a clock with free escapement.
- Étienne Lenoir (1744–1832): a precision balance.
- Pierre and Firmin Didot and Louis Etienne Herhan: an edition of Virgil.
- Jean-François Clouet: iron transformed into steel.
- Nicolas-Jacques Conté: crayons of various colors.

== Napoleonic era ==
The exhibitions that followed the first exposition were always strictly for French products, and were increasingly successful.

=== 2nd exposition (1801) ===
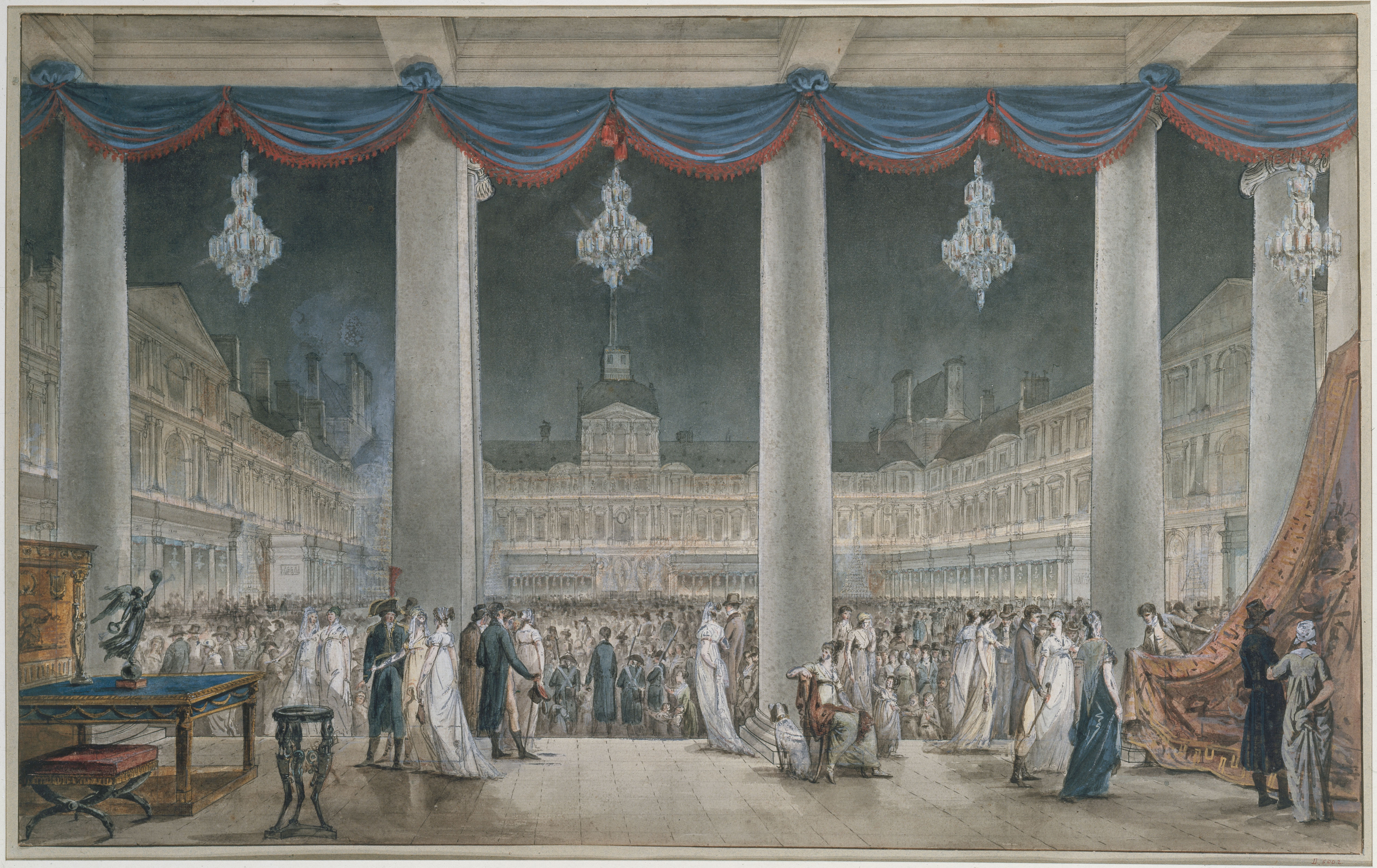
Night festival during the exhibition in the courtyard of the Louvre in the year X (1801), anonymous work shown at the Carnavalet Museum.

The Minister of the Interior, Jean-Antoine Chaptal, sent his recommendation for another industrial exposition to the three consuls on 22 Brumaire Year IX (13 November 1800). After the continental peace seemed assured, on 13 Ventôse Year IX (4 March 1801) the first consul (Napoleon) ordered another exposition for the 5 last days of year IX (1801). This exhibition was much more brilliant than the first, with more competitors and higher quality exhibits. The second exhibition was organized in the square courtyard of the Louvre Palace. It was held from September 19–25, 1801.

There were 220 exhibitors. 19 gold medals were awarded in total, including seven who had received honorable distinctions in Year VI, and 12 new exhibitors. The three consuls visited the exposition on the last complementary day (22 September 1801, and distributed 12 gold medals to manufacturers including Jacob Frères. The Jacobs shared the medal for furniture with Lignereux. The revolutionary Jacquard loom, driven by punch cards, received a bronze medal. The jury's report noted that it "replaces a worker in the weaving of brocades". It took several years before it was realized that rather than replacing weavers, the loom made higher volumes of sales possible and employed many more workers.

=== 3rd exposition (1802) ===
In the year X (1802) the exposition lasted 7 days, with 540 exhibitors. It took place from September 18–24 in the courtyard of the Louvre. There were 540 exhibitors. The exhibitors came from 63 departments, of which 12 would be separated from France in 1815. Chaptal, Minister of the Interior, was not interested in brilliantly executed work or in commonplace manufactures, but valued products for their utility, quantity and price. He saw the same merit in coarse pottery, if it was good and cheap, as the most elegant porcelain. 38 gold medals were awarded. There were 53 silver medals and 60 bronze medals. Martin-Eloy Lignereux was awarded the gold medal for cabinet-making.

=== 4th exposition (1806) ===
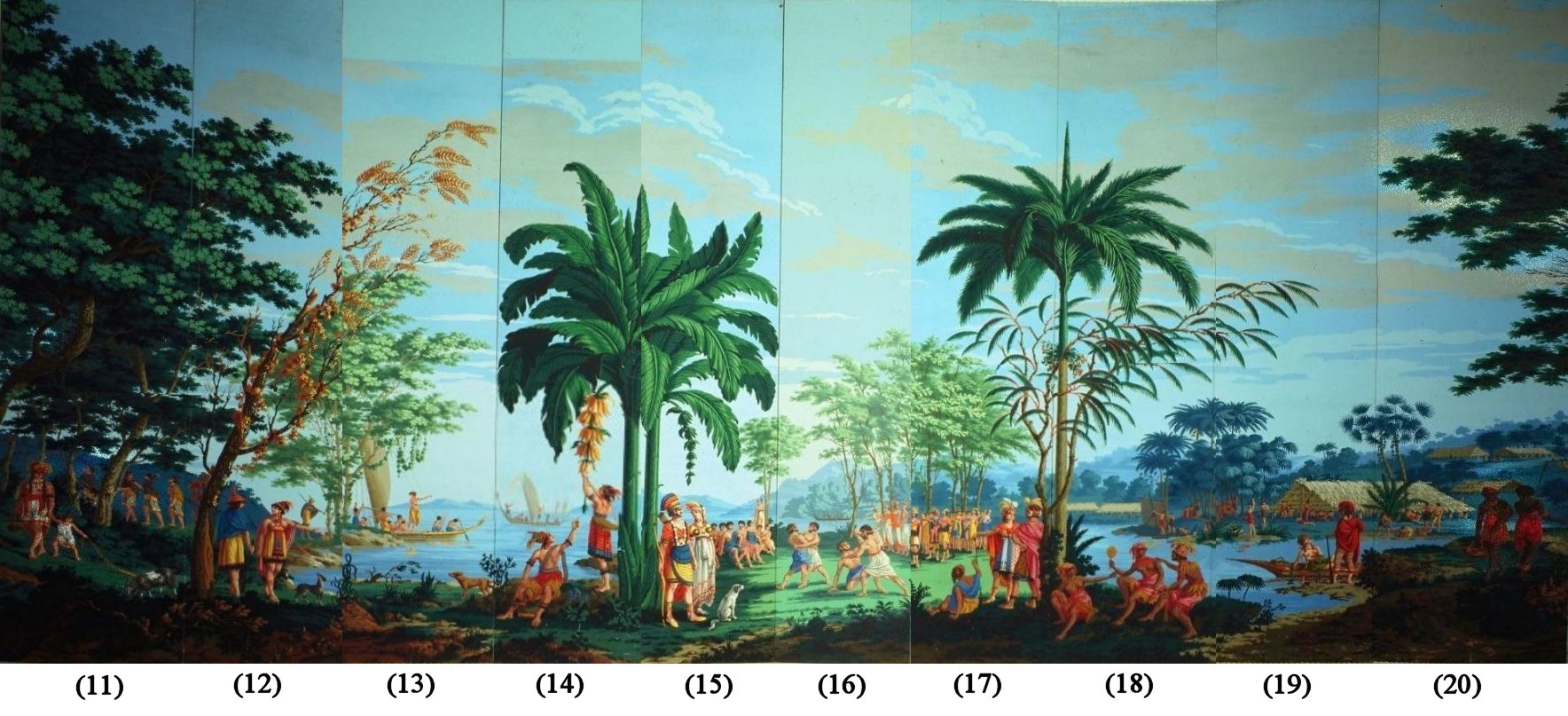
Savages of the Pacific Sea, panoramic wallpaper by Jean-Gabriel Charvet presented at the 4th exposition in 1806

After the Year X exposition the government decided that more time was needed between the expositions to allow for advances in manufacturing to mature, and put off the next exposition until 1806. In the interim the Société d'encouragement pour l'industrie nationale, founded in 1801, continued to give prizes for many branches of industry. The Emperor Napoleon decreed the 1806 exposition on 15 February 1806 after his return from the Austerlitz campaign, and the event was in part to celebrate his victories by exhibiting the fruits of peace.

The 1806 exposition lasted 24 days, with 1,422 exhibitors. It was held from September 25 to October 19 on the Esplanade des Invalides, arranged by Chaptal's successor as Minister of the Interior, Jean-Baptiste de Nompère de Champagny. Awards included 54 gold medals, 97 silver medals and 80 bronze medals. Nicolas Appert presented a selection of bottled fruits and vegetables from his manufacture but did not win any reward. Jean-Baptiste Launay presented the first model for a dome for the Paris wheat market and two cast iron bridges for the capital.

Napoleon had decreed that industrial expositions would take place every three years, with the next due to open on 1 May 1809, but military and political difficulties prevented further expositions during the remainder of the First French Empire.

== Bourbon restoration ==
The government of King Louis XVIII, after appointing Élie, duc Decazes to the post of Minister of the Interior, decided to revive the expositions of products of French industry. A royal ordinance of 13 January 1819 decreed a series of expositions at intervals of no more than four years, with the first to be held in 1819 and the second in 1821. As with previous expositions, the products had to be strictly French. The prefect of each department would name a jury which would select well-made and useful manufactured products for exhibition, preferably choosing products distinctive to the region. They should not reject coarse products as long as they were useful.

=== 5th exposition (1819) ===
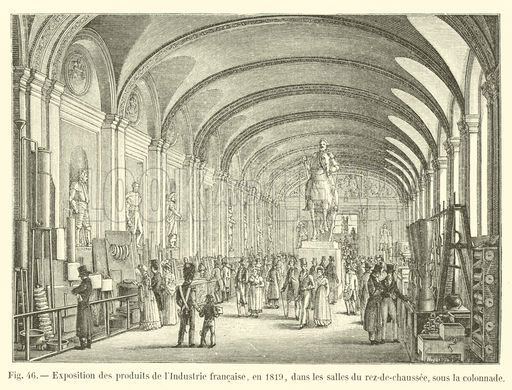
1819 exposition, ground floor of the Louvre, under the colonnade

The 19 member jury for the 5th exposition was chosen in May 1819, with the Duc de la Rochefoucauld as president and Fernand Chaptal as vice-president and rapporteur. Chaptal had arranged the 2nd and 3rd expositions, and again played a leading role. The 5th exposition opened on 25 August 1819 in the great halls of the Louvre Palace. The exposition last 35 days, with 1,662 exhibitors. It closed on 23 September 1819.

The 39 categories were much the same as in 1806, with the main emphasis on fabrics. Cashmere products were exhibited, but the jury noted that they could not compete in price with products made in India. Silk products showed advances in dying to create white and Prussian blue silk. New machines for carding and refining wool were displayed. As with the 1806 exposition, there were five levels of distinction: gold, silver and bronze medals, an honorable mention and a simple citation. Manufacturers who had won an award before could only receive a new award for a different product, or for a superior version of the old one. There were 886 awards. 84 gold medals were awarded. These included:

- Gold medal: Jean-Baptiste Marie Chaptal de Chanteloup (Jean-Antoine Chaptal's son) for the chemicals industry category.
- Gold medal: Marie-Jeanne-Rosalie Desarnaud-Charpentier for her dressing table
- Gold medal: Édouard Sévène in Rouen

The King also rewarded many of the scientists, artists and manufacturers with the Legion of Honour or even the title of Baron. Joseph Marie Jacquard was awarded a medal of the Legion of Honour for his loom.

=== 6th exposition (1823) ===
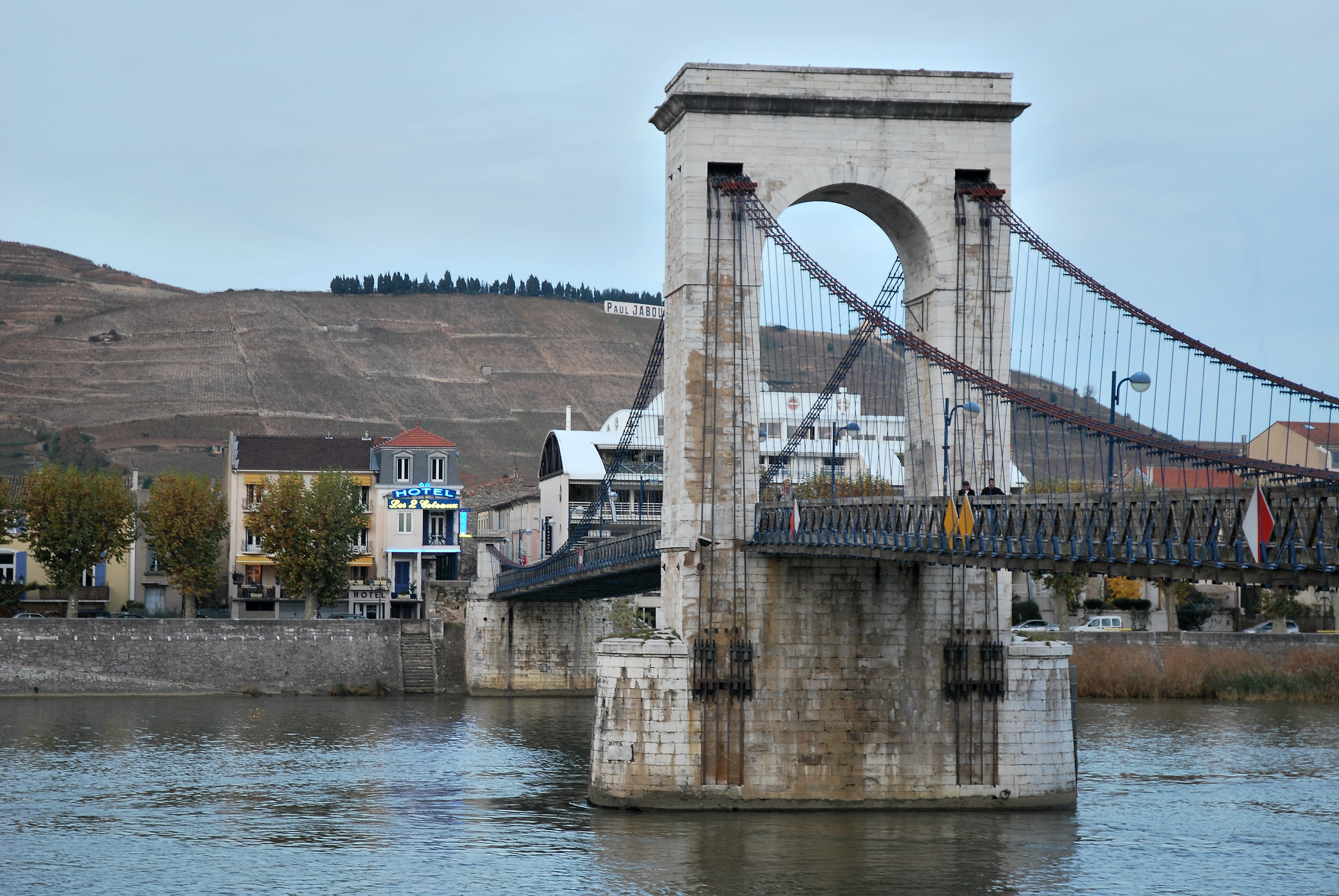
Cable bridge of Marc Seguin between Tain and Tournon

Louis XVIII ordered another exposition for 1821, but events forced a delay until 1823. In January 1823 the Minister of the Interior announced that an industrial exposition would be held in the Louvre from 25 August 1823 to 15 October 1823, with the same instructions as in 1819 sent to the departments of France. The exposition was again held on the ground floor of the Louvre. The exposition lasted 50 days, with 1,642 exhibitors. The emphasis was on industry, but some luxury goods were exhibited including two vases by the Manufacture de Nast of Henri and François Nast. Although fabrices still featured prominently there were more metal products than before showing the recent advances in metallurgy. A model was exhibited of a planned suspension bridge which would span the Rhône from Tain-l'Hermitage to Tournon-sur-Rhône. The bridge, designed by Marc Seguin, was completed in 1825.

=== 7th exposition (1827) ===
The 7th exposition was held in 1827 under the reactionary King Charles X of France, who would soon be deposed. It was held in a time of economic uncertainty, but still attracted more than 600,000 visitors. The exposition lasted 60 days, with 1,695 exhibitors. 1,254 prizes were awarded. Jérôme-Adolphe Blanqui wrote an independent history of the exposition in which he attacked high taxes that penalized industry and protectionism that harmed consumers.

== July Monarchy ==
The first exposition of the July monarchy was planned for 1832 but had to be cancelled due to riots followed by a cholera epidemic. In October 1833 it was decreed that there would be an industrial exposition in Paris every five years, starting in 1834. The 1839 exposition was staged on schedule, as would be the next two expositions.

=== 8th exposition (1834) ===
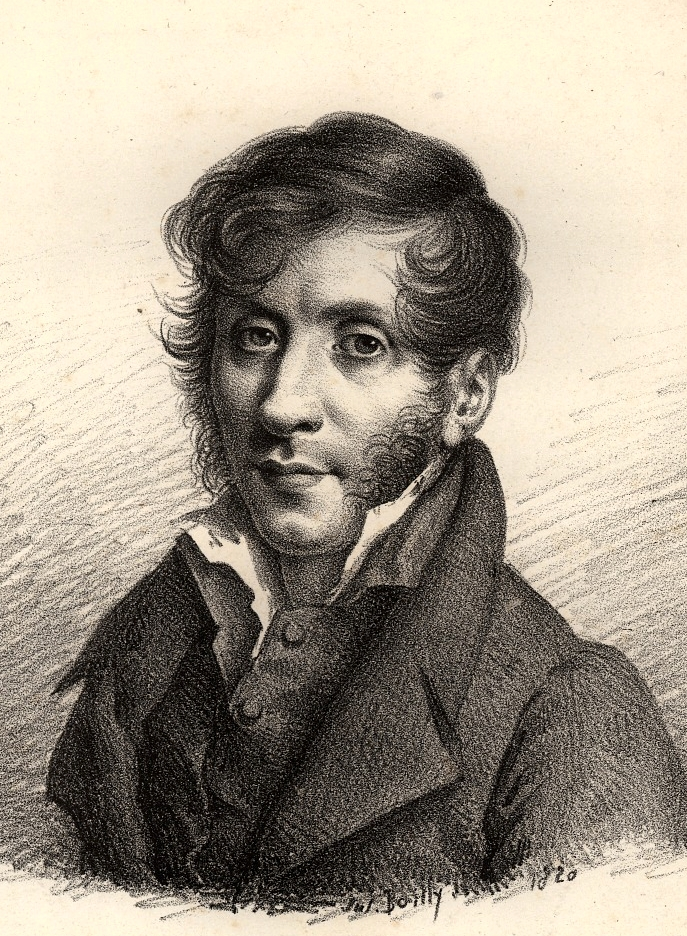
Charles Dupin, rapporteur of the 1834 exposition

Four large buildings were designed for the 1834 exposition by M. Moreau and erected in the Place de la Concorde between La Madeleine and the Palais Bourbon. The buildings had simple exterior decoration and were generally well-made, apart from some problems with rain leaking in. Each building was divided into four 13 metres (43 ft) long aisles and contained a 50 by 21 metres (164 by 69 ft) courtyard. The exposition ran from 1 May 1834 to 30 June 1834. There were 2,447 exhibits in an area of 14,288 square metres (153,790 sq ft). The exposition lasted 60 days, with 2,447 exhibitors.

Commissioner Adolphe Thiers notified the departmental prefects of the criteria for submissions, saying that the exhibits should mainly be products for the masses, and ideally would combine high quality and low price. Entries were divided into categories of use: food and food preparation; health; weaving processes and clothing; home products; transportation; products for smell, hearing, etc.; calculation, measurement and applied engineering; education and training; and social amenities. The categorization caused confusion among the visitors. Charles Dupin of the Institut Français, a famous statistician, was named rapporteur for the central jury of 1834. For each branch of industry he noted the quantities and value of French exports and imports, with comparative figures for 1823, 1827 and 1834.

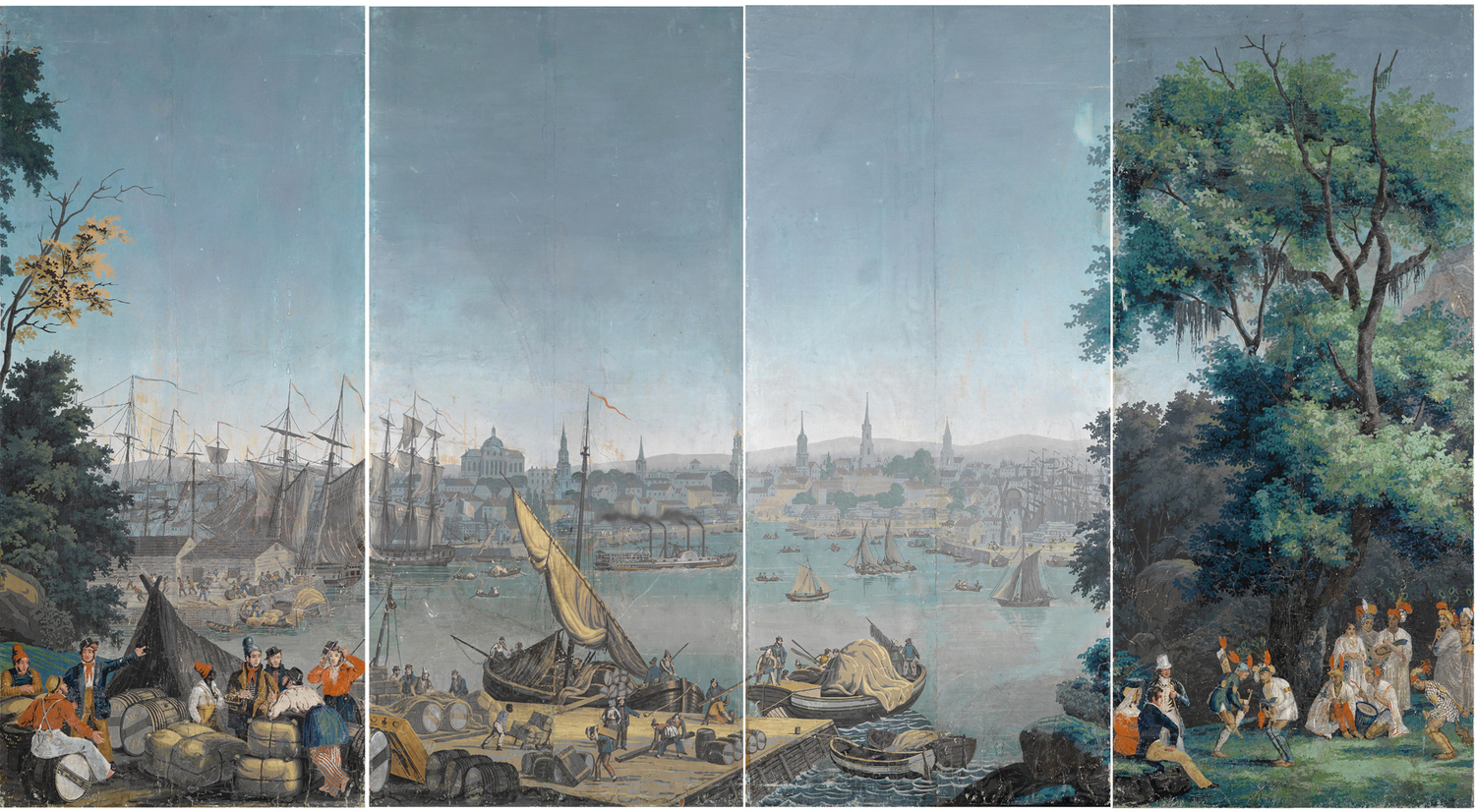
Zuber & Cie wallpaper series – Scenes from North America

The innovative products included mass-printed rolls of wallpaper made by Zuber & Cie in Mulhouse. Automation in the areas of wood engraving, enameling and wood-inlaying created reduced-cost products that formerly only the wealthy could afford. The most revolutionary product was "elastic tissue", or sheets of rubber, for which there seemed to be great potential although the use was unclear.

=== 9th exposition (1839) ===
In 1839 the exposition lasted 60 days, with 3,281 exhibitors. It opened in the Champs-Élysées on 1 May and closed on 29 June. There were 3,381 exhibits in an area of 16,500 square metres (178,000 sq ft), which caused serious overcrowding. A new hall was thrown up at the last minute to contain the excess.

Louis Philippe I toured the whole exhibition the day before it opened, and spoke at the opening. In the weeks that followed he carefully examined all the exhibits, surrounded by an enthusiastic crowd. A new set of categories was used: Fabrics, Chemicals, Metals and Minerals, Fine Arts, Agricultural Utensils, Ceramics, Precision and Musical Instruments, Miscellaneous. The manufacturers had learned to take the expositions very seriously, since an award had real value. When it was found that some members of the jury were also exhibiting products from their own companies, these products were excluded from gaining prizes. With musical instruments it was decided that the manufacturer's name had to be erased or hidden to avoid biasing the jury, who should judge the instrument purely on its quality. Among the musical instruments and other types of product the jury had difficulty comparing the submissions since they had very varied size, shape and other features.

There were 2,305 awards. There were more steam engines, and the machines were more efficient than in the previous exposition. There were more advanced looms and spinning machines for cotton and wool yarn. The most innovative product was a mass-produced Daugerrotype camera cabinet manufactured by Alphonse Giroux, the brother-in-law of Louis Daguerre. It did not win an award, although Giroux did gain a silver medal for a jewelry box. The 1839 exposition attracted considerable interest by foreign manufacturers, and catalogs or reports on it were published in Austria, Germany and Sweden. Similar, if smaller, exhibitions were staged in most other European countries.

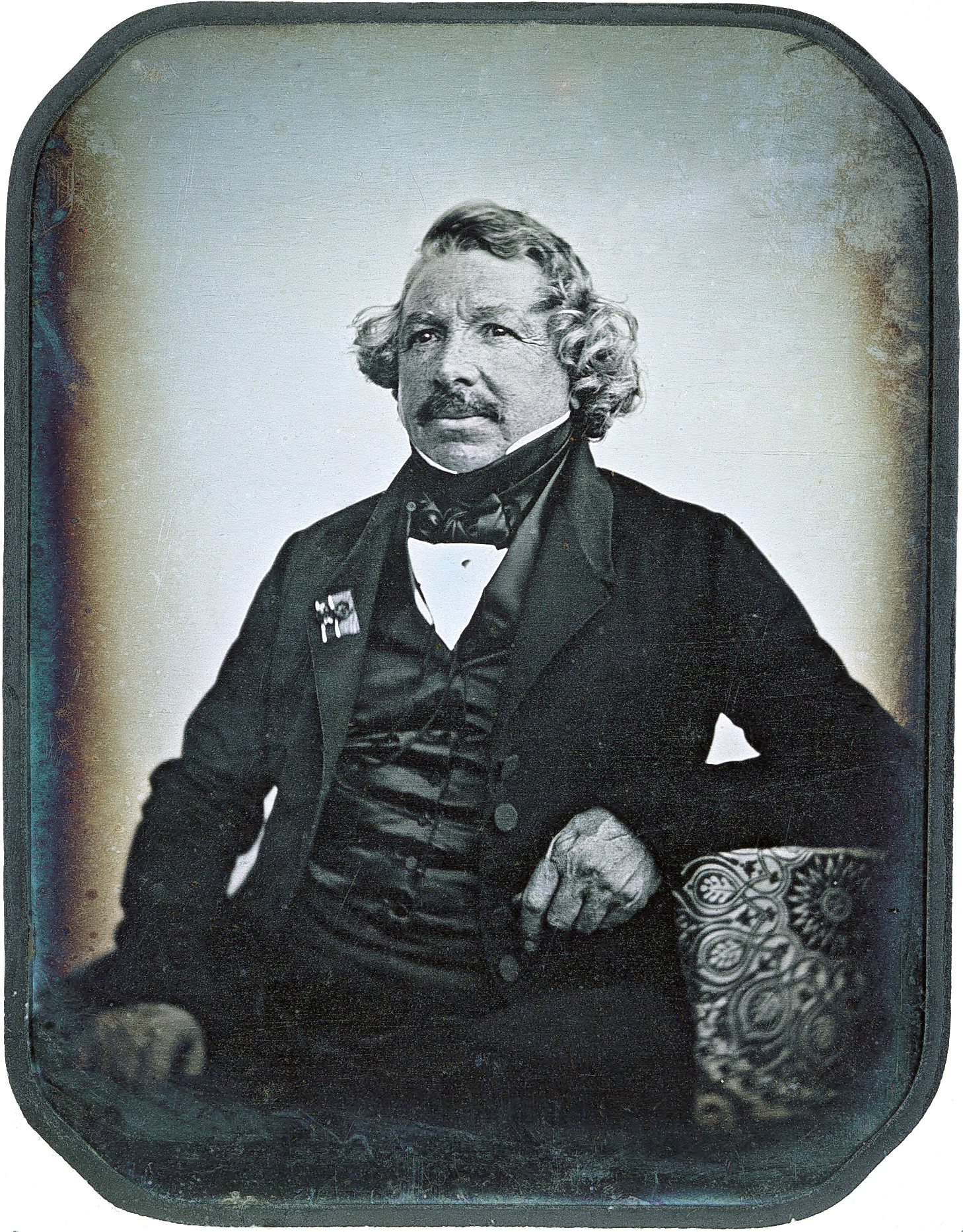
1844 daguerreotype of Louis Daguerre by Jean-Baptiste Sabatier-Blot

=== 10th exposition (1844) ===
In 1844 the exposition last 60 days, with 3,960 exhibitors. It opened in the Champs-Élysées on 1 May and closed on 29 June. In the 1844 exposition it was found necessary to exclude retailers who did not make their own products, and to eliminate anything that was not socially useful, which included both freak artisan products and instruments used only by scientists. Entrants had to fill out a form that gave information about their business including its nature, number of employees, materials used, export and domestic earning and so on. The King opened the exposition and toured all the exhibits. Hector Berlioz composed and conducted the Hymne à la France, a great symphonic and choral work performed during the opening. Several vaudeville skits were performed during the exposition.

The King came back every Monday to examine some exhibits in more detail. There were 3,969 exhibitors, with most exhibits held in forty galleries in the grand hall. Exhibits were placed in the categories: Fabrics, Metals and other Minerals, Machinery, Precision Instruments, Chemical Arts, Fine Arts, Pottery, and Diverse Arts. Louis Philippe presided over an award ceremony on 29 July 1844 in the Tuileries Palace. He personally presented 31 Legion of Honour medals to the most distinguished exhibitors. In all there were 3,253 awards. These included:

- Gold medal: Louis-Georges Mulot in the category «Machines»
- Adolphe Sax presented an example of the Saxhorn.
- Charles Xavier Thomas of Colmar presented the arithmometer.
- Jean-Baptiste Sabatier-Blot presented his daguerreotypes, and received an honourable mention.

== Second Republic: 11th exposition (1849) ==
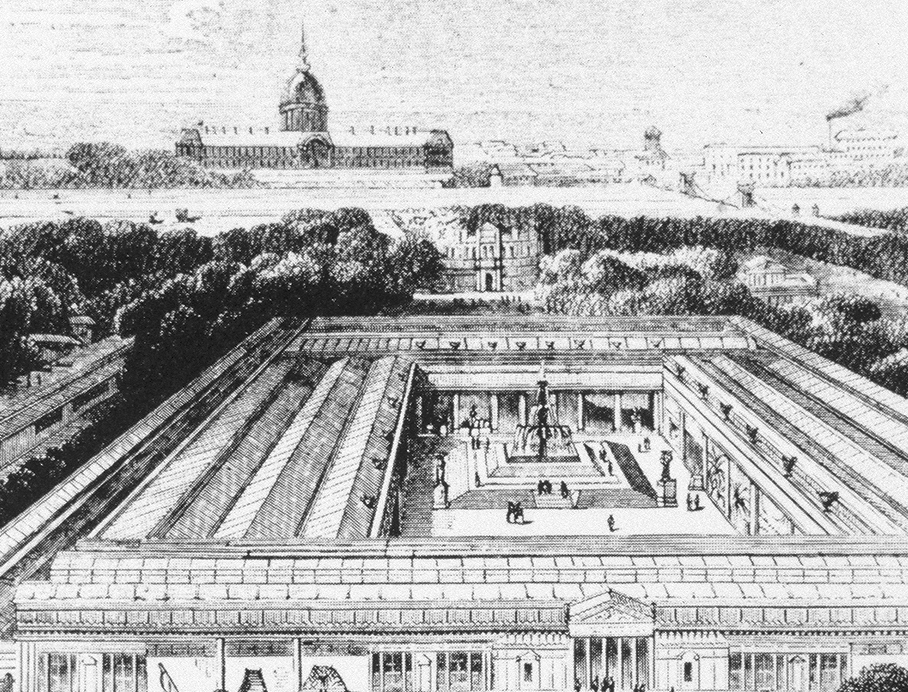
1849 Exposition Hall, Les Invalides in the background

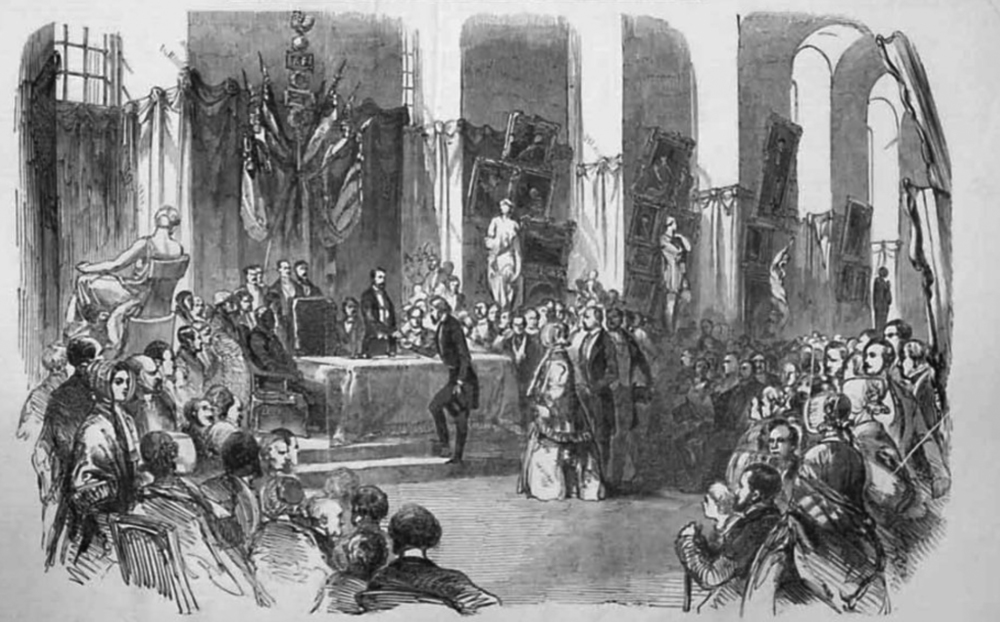
President Bonaparte Distributes Prizes at the Close of the 1849 Exposition

Louis Philippe was deposed in 1848 and the French Second Republic was declared. Louis Napoleon Bonaparte was elected president. The exposition had become institutionalized by now, and had attracted competition from events in Bern (1845), Madrid (1845), Saint Petersburg (1848) and Lisbon (1849). The scheduled 1849 exposition in Paris would demonstrate the legitimacy of the Second Republic, and would provide a platform for declaring that Algiers was now part of France. It was decided to give agriculture an equal role to manufacturing, so the event was the "Exposition Nationale des produits de l’industrie agricole et manufacturière".

The 11th exposition lasted for 60 days, from 1 June 1849 to 30 July 1849, held in the Champs-Élysées. There were 5,494 exhibitors The government covered the exhibitors' moving costs, but did not insure the exhibits. Auguste Mimerel succeeded in excluding foreign products. At first it was expected that all exhibits would be held within a single new 22,000 square metres (240,000 sq ft) hall built on the Champs-Elysées, but it was found that separate buildings were need to house some of the larger machines. The main hall included a large rain-fed reservoir that supplied fire hoses, and 75 guards and firemen were on duty throughout the exposition. The hall had a large open-air courtyard in its center with a fountain, chairs, statues, flowers and fragrant orange and lemon trees.

There was no entrance fee apart from Thursday, when 1 franc was charged for admission and donated to charity. Exhibits were placed in the categories of Agriculture and Horticulture, Algeria, Machines, Metal, Precision Instruments, Chemical Arts, Ceramic Arts, Fabrics, Fine Arts and Diverse Arts. Agricultural implements were exhibited, and there were also stalls with pigs and chickens. The Algerian section mainly featured raw materials and handiwork such as raw silk, tobacco, minerals, cotton, wool and fabrics. Adolph Sax's saxophone was shown in public for the first time.

The opening ceremonies followed the standard format. Louis-Napoleon visited the individual exhibits on Mondays, as Louis Philippe had done. Louis-Napoleon presided over the final ceremonies, which began at 9:45 a.m. on 11 November 1849 in the Palais de Justice, where he gave out awards of the Legion of Honour. Mass was then celebrated at Sainte-Chapelle, and the company moved to the main hall, where the Minister of Agriculture and Commerce gave a lengthy speech, followed by a speech by Napoleon, and finally the list of 3,738 award winners was read out.

There were many foreign visitors, and official reports were published in German and English. The English periodical The Art Union covered the event thoroughly, and called for a similar exposition in London. It was soon decided to hold a European exposition in London in 1851, the Great Exhibition, where British and foreign products could be compared.

== Sources ==
- Catalogue des produits industriels qui ont été exposés au Champ de Mars pendant les trois derniers jours complémentaires de l'An VI (in French) – via Gallica
- Chandler, Arthur, Exposition of the Second Republic
- Chandler, Arthur (1990a), "L'Exposition publique des produits de l'industrie française Paris, 1798", World's Fair, X (1)
- Chandler, Arthur, Expositions of the July Monarchy
- Chandler, Arthur, Expositions of the Restoration
- Chandler, Arthur, The Napoleonic Expositions
- Colmont, Achille de (1855), Histoire des Expositions des produits de l'Industrie Française (in French), Guillaumin
- Costaz, Cl. Anthelme, ed. (1806), Les objets envoyés à l'exposition des produits de l'industrie française (in French), Paris : Imprimerie impériale: S.E.M de Champagny, ministre de l’intérieur, p. 349
- Déniel, Patrick (2 February 2013), "La difficile naissance du patronat français", L'Usine Nouvelle (in French)
- Exposition des produits de l'industrie française en 1844. Rapport du jury central (in French), vol. 2, Le Conservatoire numérique des Arts & Métiers
- Douyere-Demeulenaere, Christiane (2005), "Expositions publiques des produits de l'industrie française avant 1850" (PDF), archivesnationales.culture.gouv.fr (in French)
- "Fête de nuit durant l'expostition des produits de l'industrie dans la cour carrée du Louvre en l'an X (1801)", carnavalet.paris.fr (in French)
- Garcia, Rebeca; Adrian, Jean (2009), "Nicolas Appert: Inventor and Manufacturer", Food ReviewsInternational, 25 (2)
- "L'ancêtre des Expositions universelles", histoire-image.org (in French)
- Merceron, Jérôme (2000), Martin-Eloy Lignereux, marchand-mercier à Paris à la fin du XVIIIe siecle (Mémoire de DEA sous la direction de MM. Alain Mérot et Bill Pallot) (in French)
- Musée industriel et artistique, ou Description complète de l'Exposition des produits de l'industrie française faite en 1849. 11e exposition : prospectus (in French), Paris: Exposition publique des produits de l'industrie française / J. Renouard, 1849
- Notices sur les objets envoyés à l'exposition des produits de l'industrie française (in French), Paris: imprimerie impériale, 1806
- Rapport du jury central sur les produits de l'industrie française, Paris: imprimerie royale, 1819
