= Dominique Daguerre =

Dominique Daguerre (1740–27 August 1796) was a Parisian marchand-mercier who was in partnership from 1772 with Simon-Philippe Poirier, an arbiter of taste and the inventor of furniture mounted with Sèvres porcelain plaques; Daguerre assumed Poirier's business at La Couronne d'Or in the Faubourg Saint-Honoré in 1777/78. Daguerre commissioned furniture from ébénistes such as Adam Weisweiler, Martin Carlin and Claude-Charles Saunier, and menuisiers like Georges Jacob, for whom he would provide designs, for resale to his clients, in the manner of an interior decorator. A series of watercolours that Daguerre sent to Albert, Duke of Sachsen-Teschen, the brother-in-law of Marie Antoinette, who was refurnishing the castle of Laeken near Brussels, are at the Metropolitan Museum of Art

By the early 1780s Daguerre had moved to London and formed a partnership with Martin-Eloi Lignereux, who remained in Paris. Daguerre set up premises in Sloane Street, Chelsea. He was responsible for furnishing interiors at Carlton House, where his account in 1787 for furniture and furnishings totalled £14,565 13s 6d, and at Brighton Pavilion for George, Prince of Wales, 1787-89. Even chimneypieces were imported from Paris, to be adjusted by craftsmen in London, according to surviving bills.

At Carlton House, at Woburn Abbey, and for Earl Spencer at Althorp (1790) Daguerre worked in loose collaboration with the architect Henry Holland, though he emphasized in one Carlton House bill, "son Altesse Royale Seul m'a donné des orders" Similar sets of mahogany chairs by Georges Jacob, with openwork backs in lozenges and circles, are in the Royal Collection and in the Library, at Woburn, where Holland was executing alterations; they are likely to have been supplied through Daguerre.
