= Martin Carlin =

Parisian ébéniste (c.1730–1785)

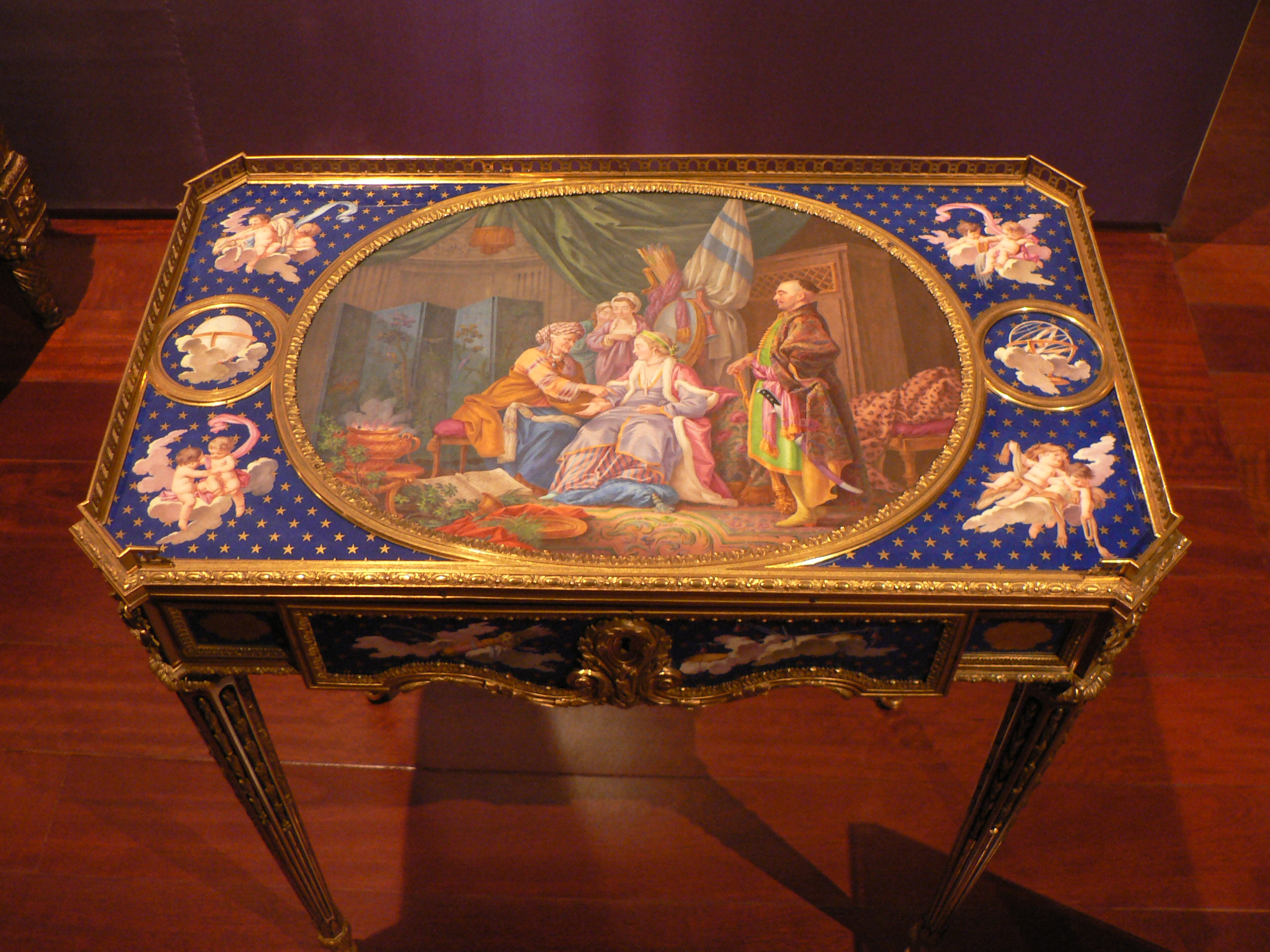
Small table with Sèvres plaques, by Carlin, 1772 (Museu Calouste Gulbenkian, Lisbon)

Martin Carlin (c. 1730–1785) was a Parisian ébéniste (cabinet-maker), born at Freiburg, who was received as Master Ébéniste at Paris on 30 July 1766. Renowned for his "graceful furniture mounted with Sèvres porcelain", Carlin fed into the luxury market of eighteenth-century decorative arts, where porcelain-fitted furniture was considered among "the most exquisite furnishings" within the transitional and neoclassical styles. Carlin's furniture was popular amongst the main great dealers, including Poirier, Daguerre, and Darnault, who sold his furniture to Marie Antoinette and many amongst the social elite class. He died on 6 March 1785.

== Work life ==
Carlin worked at first in the shop of Jean-François Oeben, whose sister he married. The marriage contract reveals that "Carlin was still a day-worker living on the quai des Célestins". Yet soon after Oeben's death, Carlin started to sell furniture to the marchands-merciers when setting up independently in the Faubourg Saint-Antoine. This was however an unfashionable quarter of Paris, where few of his wealthy clientele would have penetrated. Therefore, Carlin found it necessary to sell his works exclusively to marchands-merciers such as Simon-Philippe Poirier and his partner Dominique Daguerre, who acted as decorative-designers. It was only through these entrepreneurs that Carlin could acquire the Sèvres porcelain plaques that decorated many of his pieces. His earliest such pieces can be dated by the marks on their porcelain to 1766; they followed designs supplied by the dealer Poirier. The great dealers also possessed an expansive network of the monarchy and much of the nobility, and thus sold Carlin's furniture to figures such as, Marie Antoinette, the Count of Provence, the Count of Artois, Louis XV's daughters, the mesdames de France, Madame du Barry, and the Duchess of Mazarin.

For 12 years after becoming Master Ebéniste, he made porcelain-mounted furniture for Poirier and after 1778, he fed into the popular taste for exotic, 'oriental' designs and materials, and therefore started to produce sumptuous pieces in Japanese lacquer.

== Collection ==
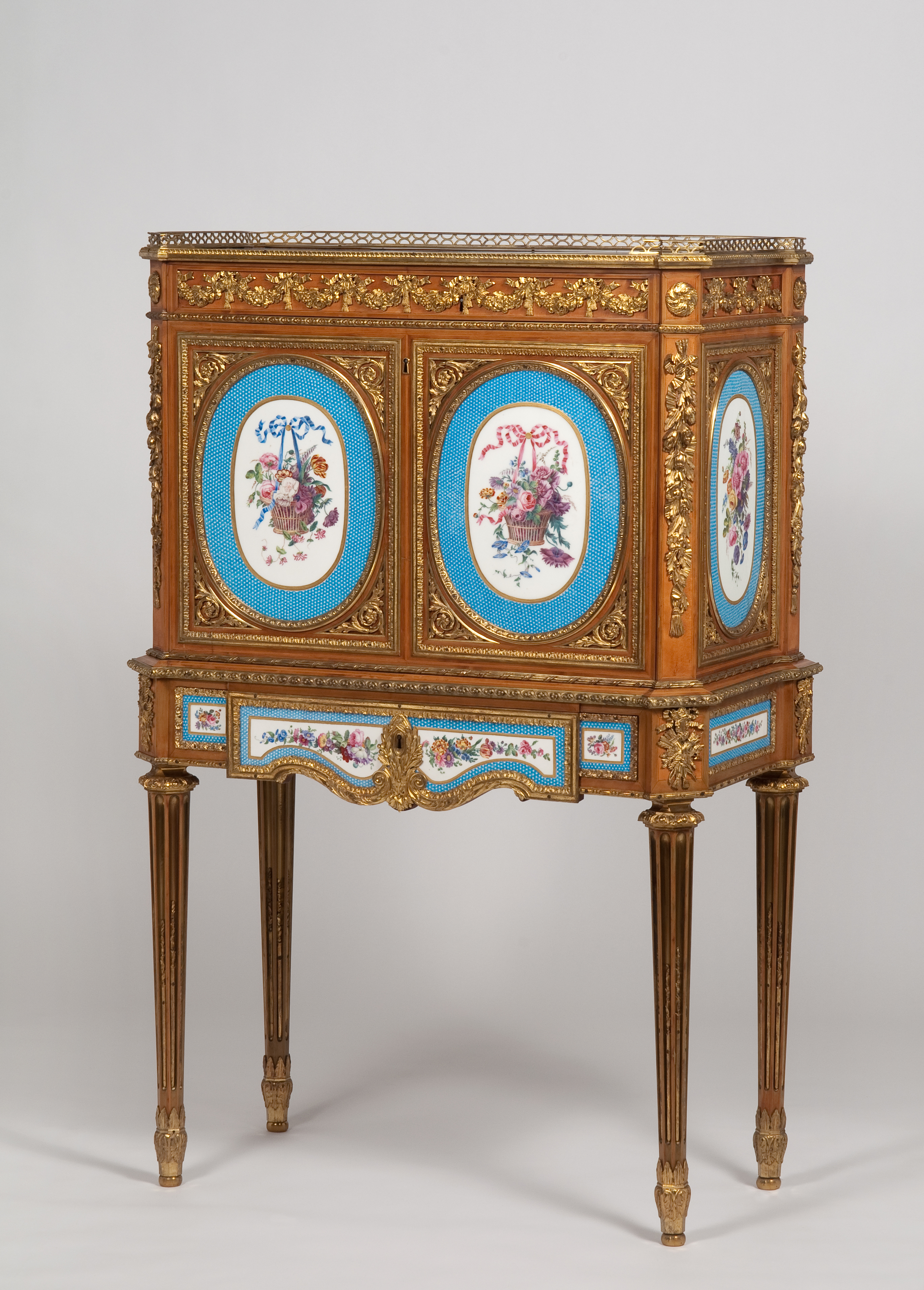
Martin Carlin, Fall-front desk, c. 1775 at Waddesdon Manor

Although Martin Carlin made some larger pieces— secrétaires à abattant (drop-front secretary desks), tables, and commodes— he is best known for refined small furnishings in the neoclassical taste, some of them veneered with cut up panels of Chinese lacquer, which he would also have received from the hands of the marchands-merciers.

=== Bonheur du jour (Table à gradin dite) ===
- Bonheur du jour, 1765, Bowes Museum, UK
- Bonheur du jour, 1766, Musée Nissim de Camondo, France
- Bonheur du jour, 1768, Boughton House, UK
- Bonheur du jour, 1768, delivered to the Comtesse du Barry, Metropolitan Museum of Art, United States
- Bonheur du jour, 1769, Metropolitan Museum of Art, United States
- Bonheur du jour, 1770, Metropolitan Museum of Art, United States
- Bonheur du jour, 1770, Huntington Library, United States
- Bonheur du jour, 1771, Huntington Library, United States
- Bonheur du jour, 1774, Metropolitan Museum of Art, United States

=== Bureau plat (Writing table) ===
- Bureau plat, 1778, delivered to the Grand Duchess Maria Feodorovna and Grand Duke Paul Petrovich of Russia for Pavlovsk Palace, Getty Museum, United States

=== Cabinet ===
- Cabinet, c. 1783, Royal Collection, UK

=== Coffret à bijoux ===
- Coffret à bijoux, 1770, delivered to Marie-Antoinette for the Petit Triannon, Palace of Versailles, France
- Coffret à bijoux, c. 1770, delivered to the Comtesse du Barry, Metropolitan Museum of Art, United States
- Coffret à bijoux, c. 1774, delivered to the Grand Duchess Maria Feodorovna and Grand Duke Paul Petrovich of Russia for the Palace of Pavlosk, Detroit Institute of Arts, United States
- Coffret à bijoux, c. 1775, Metropolitan Museum of Art, United States

Coffret à bijoux, c. 1775, Metropolitan Museum of Art, United States

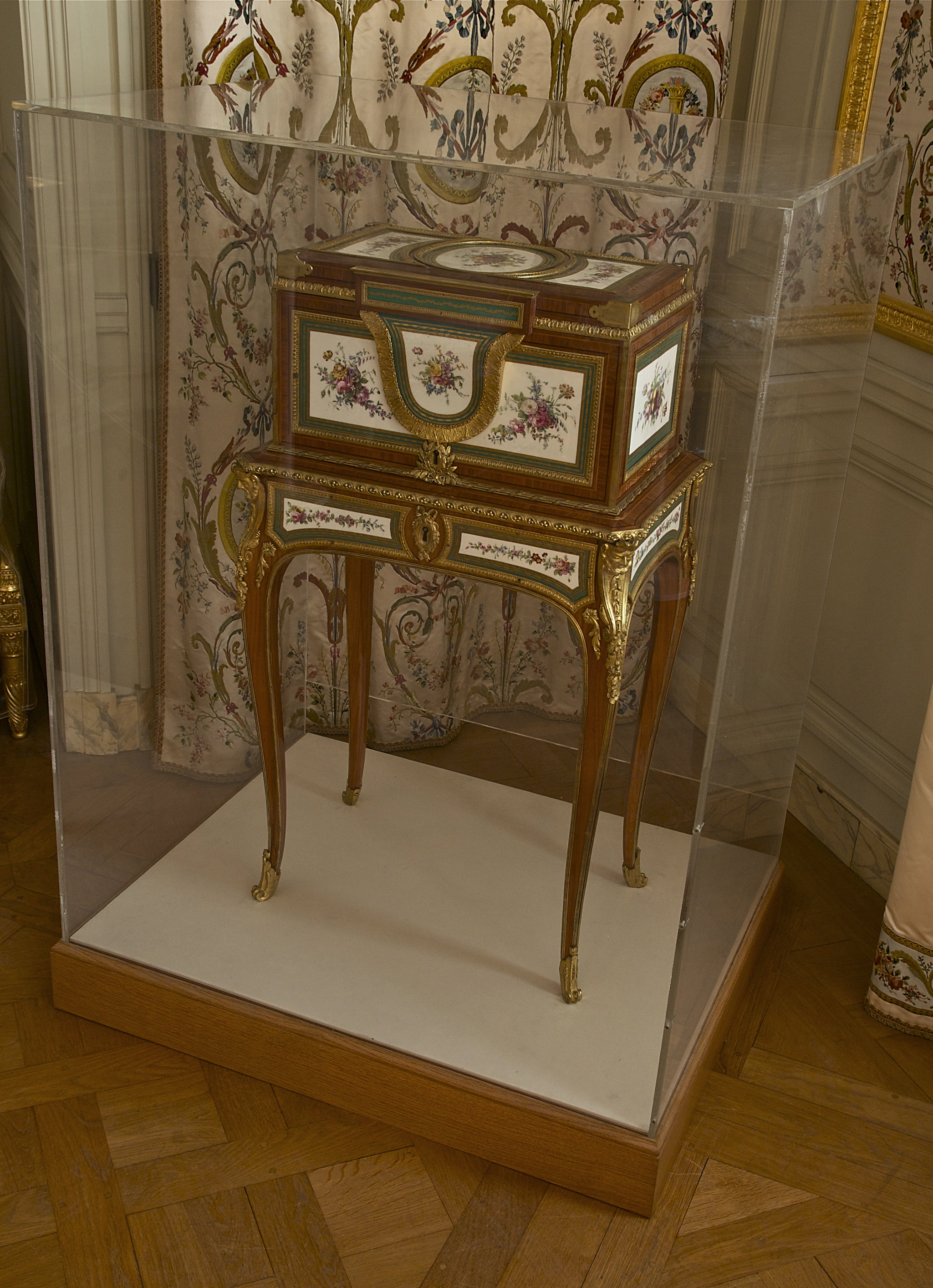
Coffret à bijoux (Jewel case on stand) 1770 (Versailles)

=== Commode à vantaux (Commode with doors) ===
- Commode à vantaux made in 1778 in ebony inset with precious pietra dura panels signed by Gian Ambrogio Giachetti. In the 18th century, this commode formed part of the collection of Pierre Victor, Baron de Besenval de Brunstatt who had it placed in his bedroom at his residence in Paris, the Hôtel de Besenval. It is one of Carlin's greatest examples and with no doubt, it was one of the baron’s finest and most valuable pieces of furniture. The commode was acquired in 1828 in Paris by King George IV through his confectioner François Benois. Today it is part of the Royal Collection and on display in the Green Drawing Room at Buckingham Palace.

=== Encoignure (Corner cabinet) ===
- Pair of Encoignures, 1772, Wallace Collection, UK

=== Music-stand ===
- Music-stand and writing table, c. 1775, Waddesdon Manor, UK
- Music-stand, 1770-75, Getty Museum, United States

=== Music-stand and writing-table ===
- Music-stand and writing-table, 1786, given by Marie-Antoinette to Mrs William Eden (later Lady Auckland), V&A, UK

=== Reading stand ===
- Reading stand, c. 1780, V&A, UK

=== Secrétaire ===
- Secrétaire, 1775, Getty Museum, United States
- Secrétaire, 1776, Wallace Collection, UK
- Secrétaire, 1776-77, Getty Museum, United States

=== Secrétaire à abattant ===
- Secrétaire à abattant, 1776, Waddesdon Manor, UK
- Secrétaire à abattant, 1770-80, V&A, UK

=== Table à ouvrage ===
- Table à ouvrage, 1770. delivered to the Duchess of Mazarin in 1779 for her dressing room, Getty Museum, United States
- Table à ouvrage, 1773, Getty Museum, United States
- Table à ouvrage, 1775, V&A, UK
- Table à ouvrage, 1783-84, Wallace Collection, UK
- Table à ouvrage, 1786, given by Marie-Antoinette to Mrs William Eden (later Lady Auckland), V&A, UK

== See also ==
- Louis XVI furniture
