= Georges Jacob =

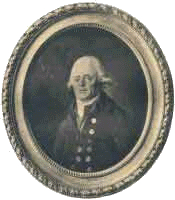
Georges Jacob in 1793

Georges Jacob (6 July 1739 – 5 July 1814) was one of the two most prominent Parisian master menuisiers. He produced carved, painted and gilded beds and seat furniture and upholstery work for the French royal châteaux, in the Neoclassical style that is associated with Louis XVI furniture.

== Life and career ==
Jacob was born in Cheny, Burgundy. He arrived in Paris in 1754 and was apprenticed to the chairmaker Jean-Baptiste Lerouge where he met Louis Delanois, whose advanced neoclassical taste was to have a great influence on Jacob. He was received master 4 September 1765, presenting for his masterpiece a small chair of gilded wood, which survives.

Without marrying either the daughter or the widow of an established menuisier, Jacob set up his own premises. He employed in his workshop numerous specialist carvers and gilders. In 1785, Jacob produced the first mahogany chairs à l'anglaise, for the comte de Provence. After Delanois' early death in 1792, Jacob's only serious rival in his field was Jean-Baptiste-Claude Sené.

He retired in 1796, leaving his workshop in the hands of his sons, one of whom was François-Honoré-Georges Jacob-Desmalter. When his other son died, Jacob returned from retirement to oversee the constant supply of furnishings for Napoleon's residences.

His descendant Hector Lefuel, son of the architect Hector Lefuel, wrote the monograph, Georges Jacob (Paris, 1923). Two models in beeswax attributed to Jacob, one for a fauteuil and one for a bed 'à la turque', have remained in the family's possession.

== Gallery ==
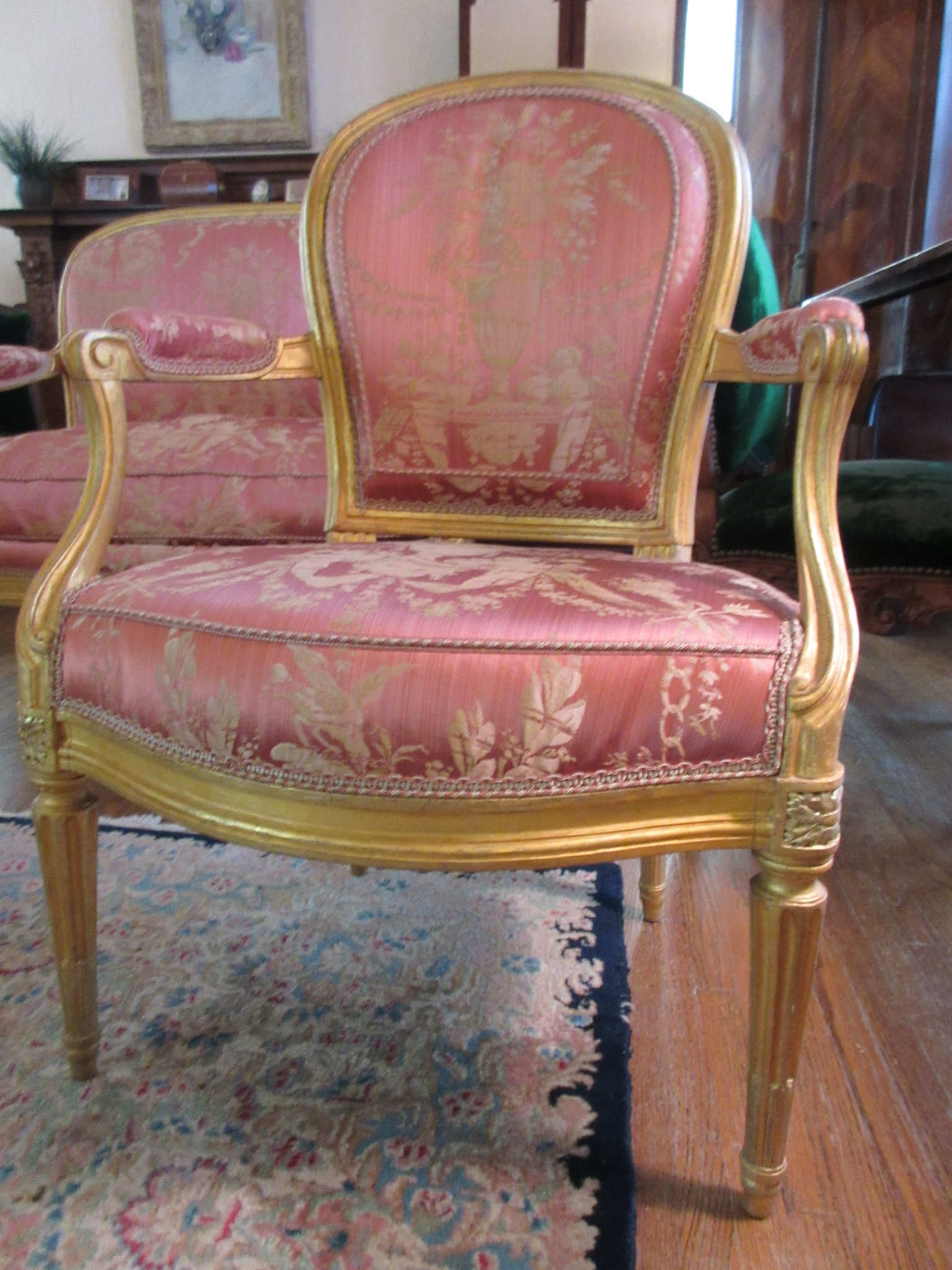
A giltwood neoclassical chair, made circa 1775 and signed by Jacob

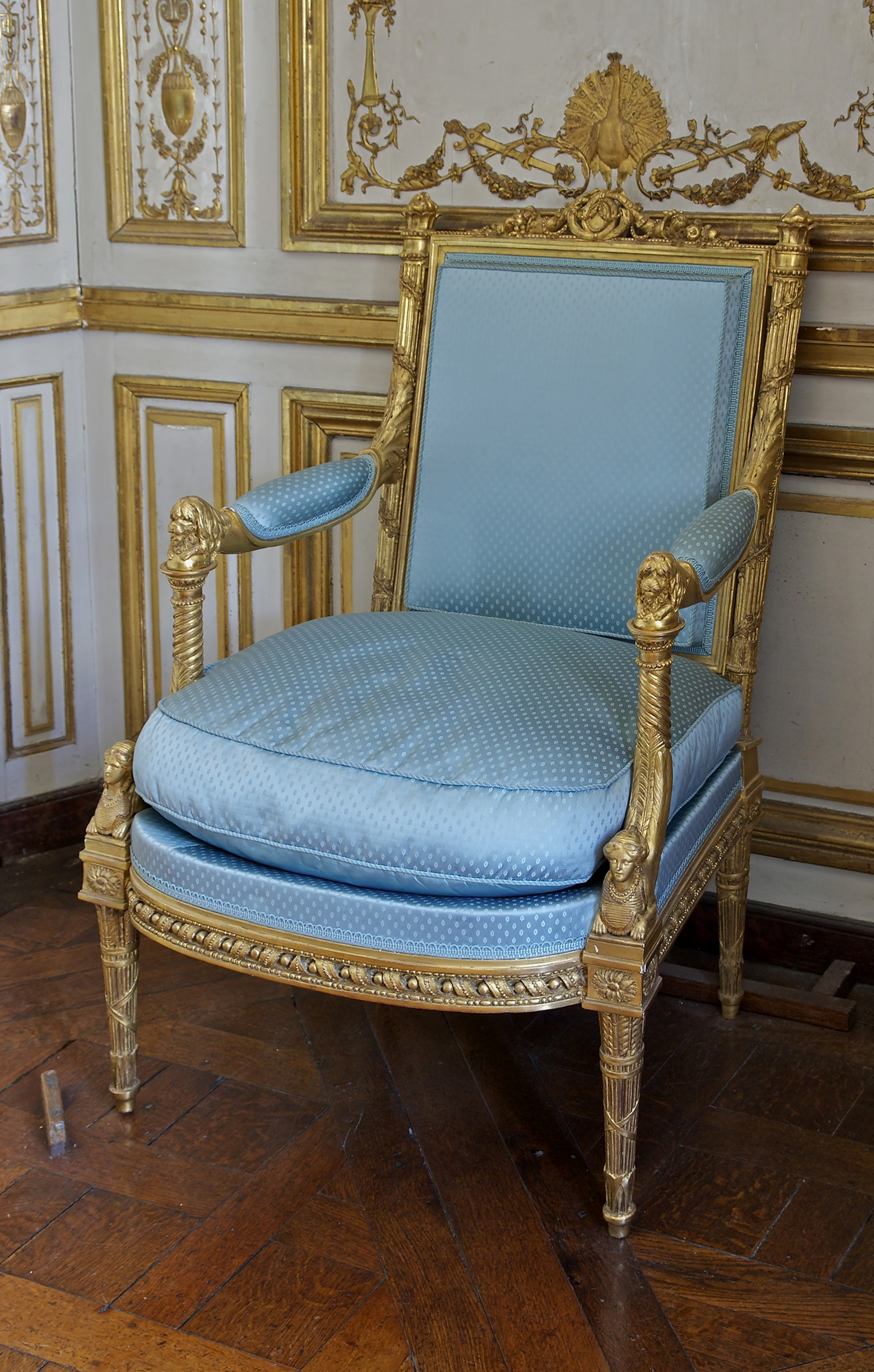
Armchair by Jacob in the Château de Versailles (1781)

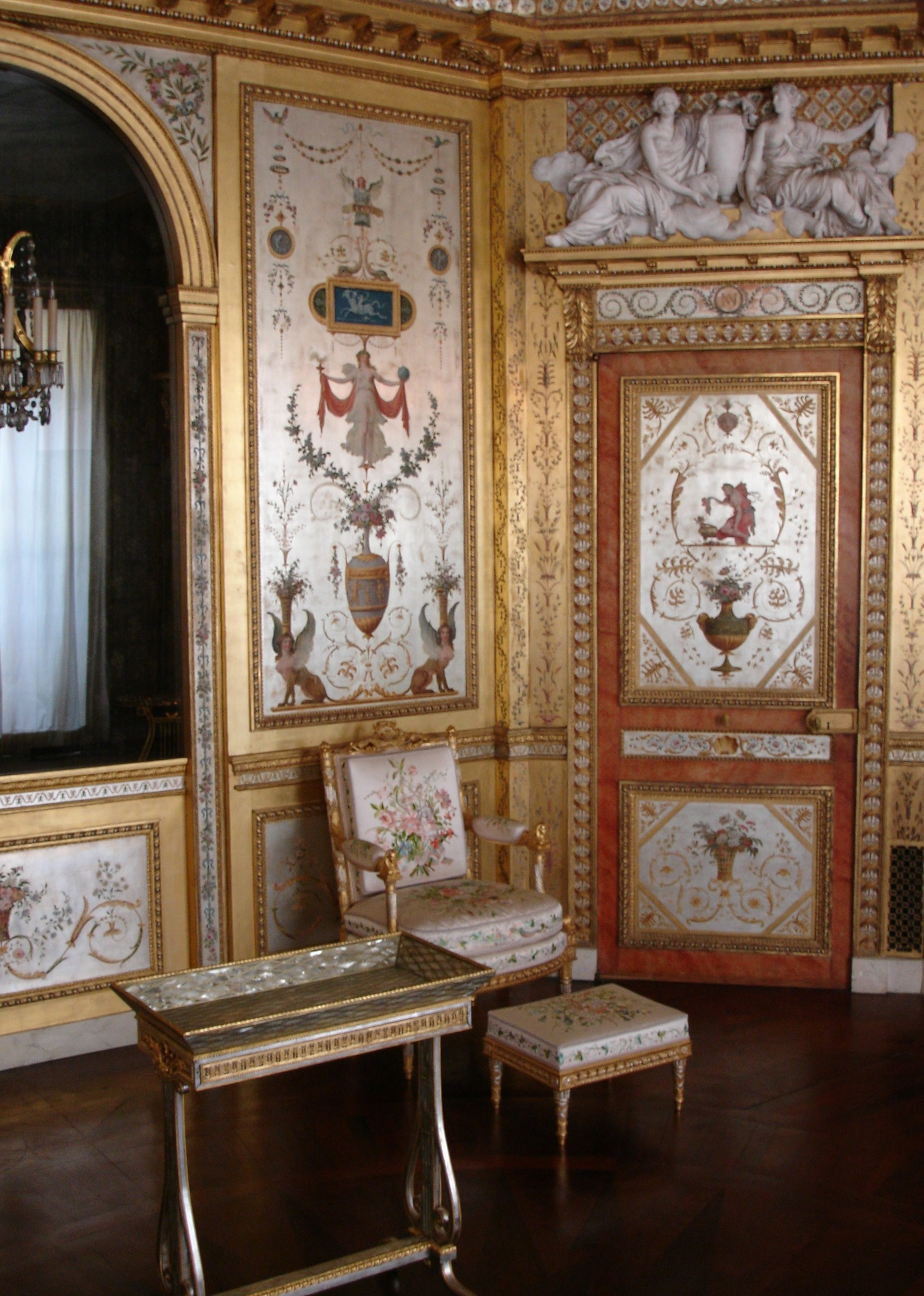
Boudoir

== See also ==
- Louis XVI furniture
- Louis XVI style
- Neoclassicism in France
