= Pierre-Philippe Thomire =

French sculptor

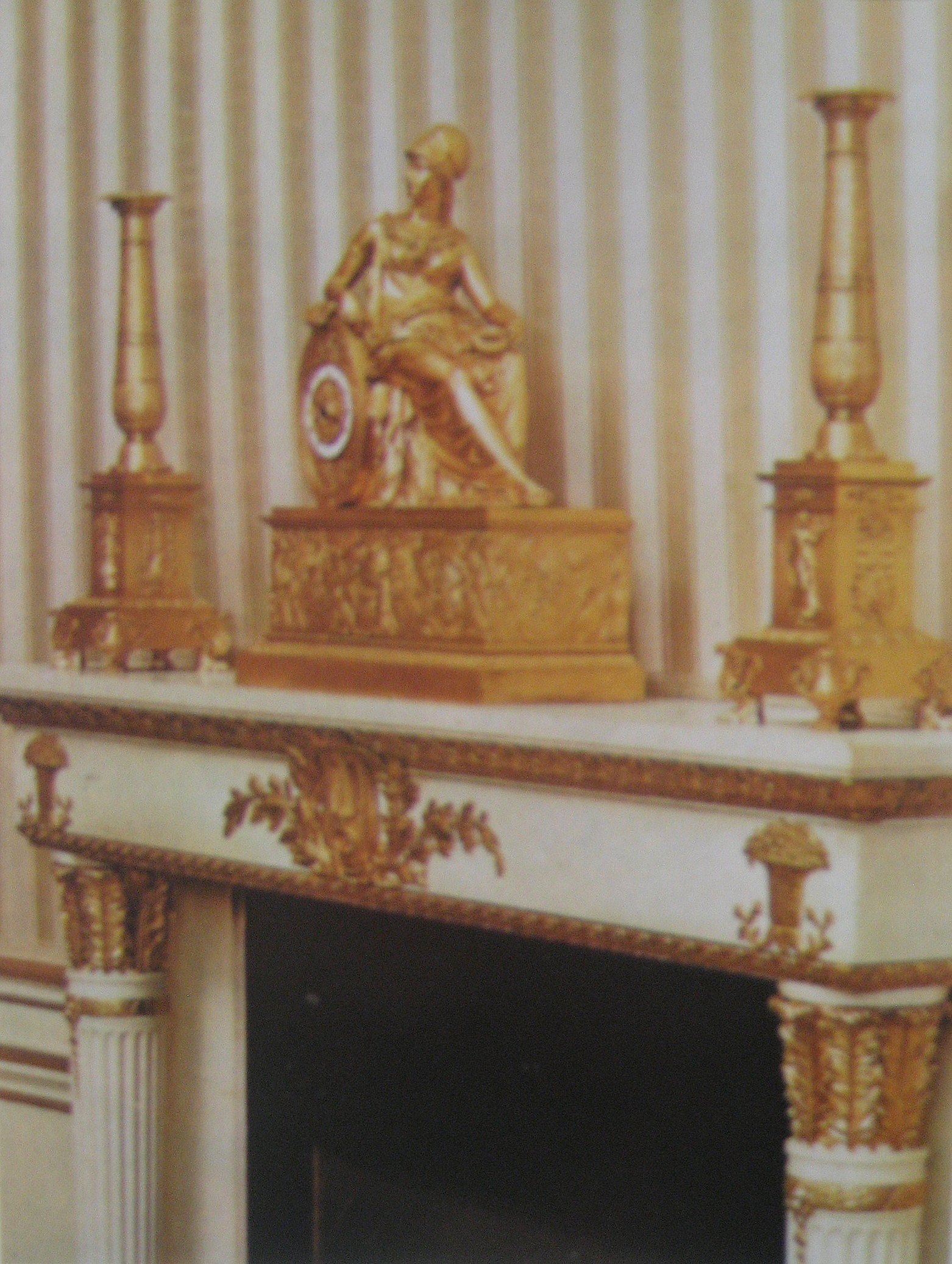
Baluster candle sticks and a French Empire mantel clock with a figure of Minerva, (1817). Located in the Blue Room of the White House, shown as decorated by Stéphane Boudin in 1963. The clock is now on a table of the Entrance Hall.

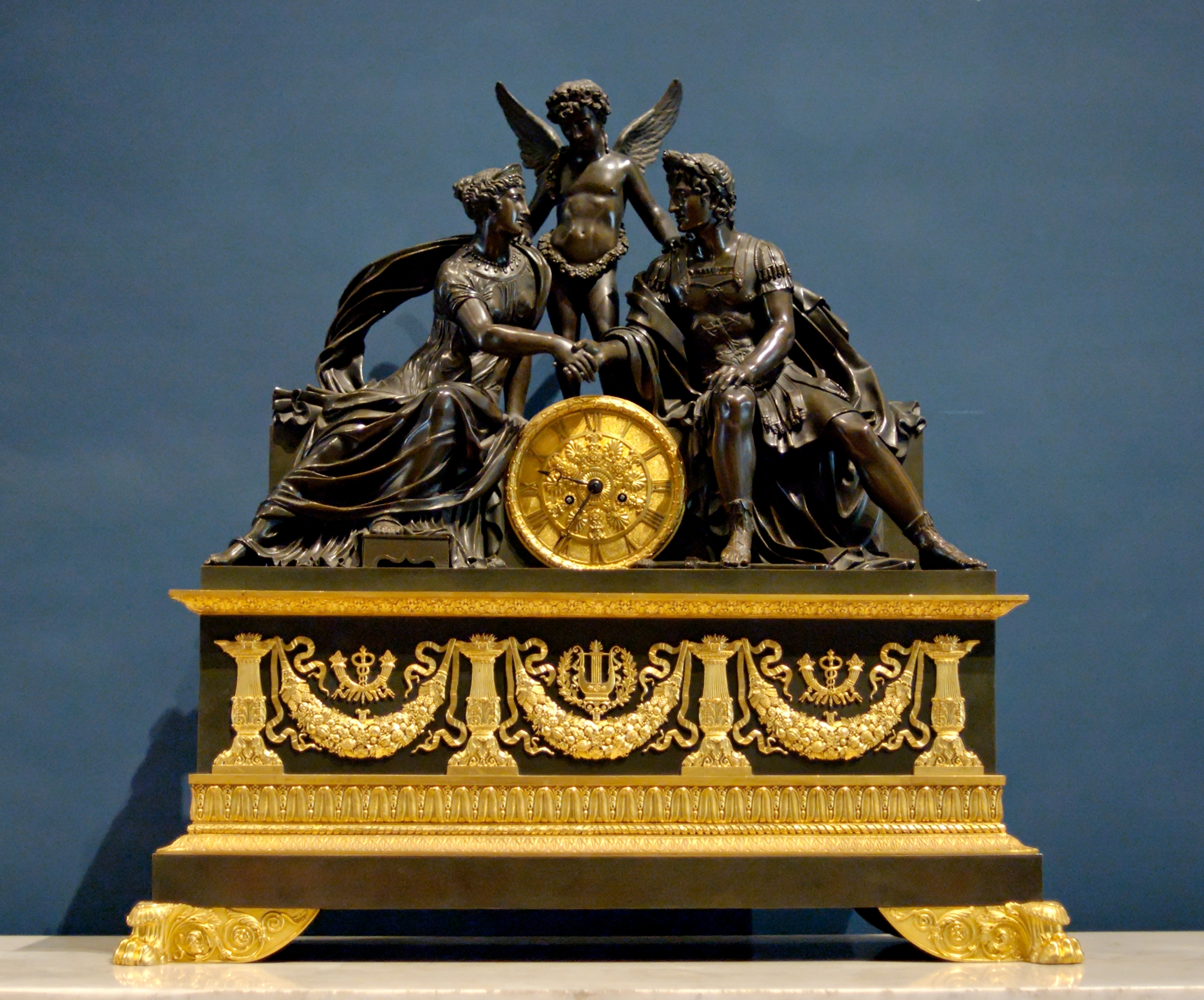
Mantel clock (c. 1810) in a gilded and patinated bronze case, symbolising the marriage of Napoleon and the Archduchess Marie-Louise, as Mars and Venus

Pierre-Philippe Thomire (1751–1843) was a French sculptor and the most prominent bronzier, or producer of ornamental patinated and gilt-bronze objects and furniture mounts, of the First French Empire. His fashionable neoclassical and Empire style furnishing bronzes (bronzes d'ameublement) established the highest standard in refined finish in the craft that the French called that of the fondeur-ciseleur, "founder-finisher". In his pre-Revolutionary training, Thomire appeared first as a ciseleur, in the division of duties that went into the production, for example, of a set of gilt-bronze wall-lights delivered for Marie Antoinette's card-room, her Salon des Jeux at Compiègne: under the general supervision of Hauré, the wax and wooden model was carved by Martin, cast by Forestier, and chased by Thomire, as Pierre Verlet was able to show over fifty years ago.

He had received his training in the workshop of Pierre Gouthière, the outstanding Parisian ciseleur-doreur working in the Louis XVI style, before establishing his own shop in 1776. He gradually assumed the leading position of his former master. In 1784 a pair of Sèvres vases with Raphaelesque grotesques in violet on a white ground, made in 1782 were mounted with gilt-bronze goats as handles, which Pierre Verlet recognized in a memorandum delivered by Thomire, who was responsible for modelling in wax, casting, matte gilding and mounting on the porcelain. In 1783–84 he received his first notable commission, casting and finishing the gilt-bronze handles modelled by Louis-Simon Boizot for a pair of Sèvres porcelain vases, today divided between the Musée du Louvre and Palazzo Pitti.

Under the Empire, Thomire purchased the fashionable premises of the marchand-mercier Martin-Éloi Lignereux, for whom he had provided furnishing bronzes in rue Taitbout, Paris. When he exhibited in the 1806 Exposition Publique des Produits de l'Industrie, the first time a bronzier was permitted among the exhibiters, he gained a gold medal. His most prestigious commission was the execution of the cradle for the King of Rome, which was designed by Pierre Paul Prud'hon and in which Thomire collaborated with the Imperial silversmith Odiot; in a second cradle, Thomire alone was responsible. At the height of his business, Niclausse estimated Thomire employed six or seven hundred workers. A great number of the bronzes by Thomire in the Imperial residences had been commissioned, but further bronzes were supplied as collateral for a loan that was extended to Thomire in 1807 and which he was unable to repay, which consequently passed into the Imperial collection in 1811.

Under the Restoration, Thomire Duterme et Cie. retained the highest clientele, among them Monsieur, the King's brother, the duc de Berry, and as furnishers to the Garde Meuble de la Couronne, though elaborate measures were taken to rededicate Napoleonic allegories in bronze and ormolu with suitably Bourbon ones. In one, Thomire cast and finished a martial allegory sculpted by Louis-Simon Boizot, who had provided draped caryatid models for furniture mounts that were touched up by Thomire, applied to the upper corners of a secretary desk by Guillaume Beneman, delivered for the King's cabinet intérieure at Compiègne, 1787.

In a notable commission for Count Nicolay Demidoff in 1819, Thomire produced finely-made figures of Fame with doubled trumpets to serve as handles for the massive malachite-veneered vase now at the Metropolitan Museum. Thomire retired from his firm in 1823.

== See also ==
- French Empire mantel clock
