= Joseph Baumhauer =

French ébéniste (died 1772)

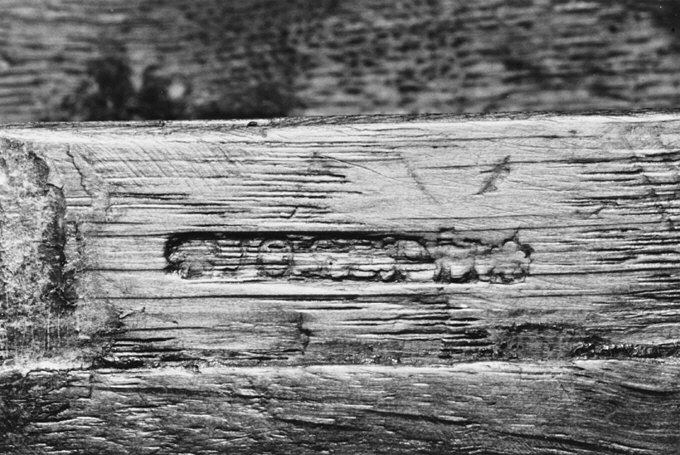
French, Paris and Sèvres; Desk; Woodwork-Furniture

Joseph Baumhauer (died 22 March 1772) was a prominent Parisian ébéniste, one of several of German extraction. Having worked for some years as a journeyman for the German-born ébéniste François Reizell, he was appointed ébéniste privilegié du Roi in 1767, enabling him to skirt certain requirements of the Paris guild under royal privilege as well as a stiff entrance fee. He used the stamp ⚜JOSEPH⚜, the name by which he was commonly known to his contemporaries, between fleurs-de-lis emblematic of his royal appointment. Such stamps, like the long-mysterious B.V.R.B., served to mask the identity of cabinetmakers to the clientele of marchands-merciers, such as Lazare Duvaux, who owed the "ébéniste Joseph" 1726 livres at the time of his death. Furniture stamped by Baumhauer that is mounted with Sèvres porcelain plaques must have been commissioned and sold by Simon-Philippe Poirier, who maintained a monopoly of the production, having originally devised the decor. some furniture stamped by Joseph is veneered with panels of Japanese lacquer, another sure indication of the intervention of a marchand-mercier, who, rather than the cabinetmaker himself, was in a position to purchase Japanese screens and cabinets, have them disassembled and, once the wooden support of the lacquer surfaces had been planed down, applied as costly veneer panels. Other marchands-merciers for whom Joseph is known to have worked include Thomas-Joachim Hébert and Charles Darnault.

The inventory of his workshop and stock in trade taken after his death following a long illness gives a snapshot of his current style; one of the appraisers was the ébéniste Martin Carlin, to whom Joseph owed 113 livres. As might be expected in 1772, some of the furniture was in Louis XV style (contournée, "serpentine" in shape) while entries for other pieces revealed their Louis XVI character, such as a table with legs "a gaine avec des Canelures", that is, with straight, fluted tapering legs. Most of the refined furniture bearing his stamp is in Louis XV style, employing crossbanded veneers of tropical woods rather than marquetry, and with sensitively-integrated gilt-bronze mounts that betoken close collaboration with the fondeurs-ciseleurs who made them, rather than purchases of stock mounts on the wholesale market.

About 1745 he married Reine Chicot, of a family of Parisian menuisiers, makers of carved panelling and seat furniture. Their son, Gaspard-Joseph Baumhauer, born in 1747, is thought to have taken over his father's business, using his father's stamp, a common practice of the time.
