= A Private View at the Royal Academy, 1881 =

Painting by William Powell Frith

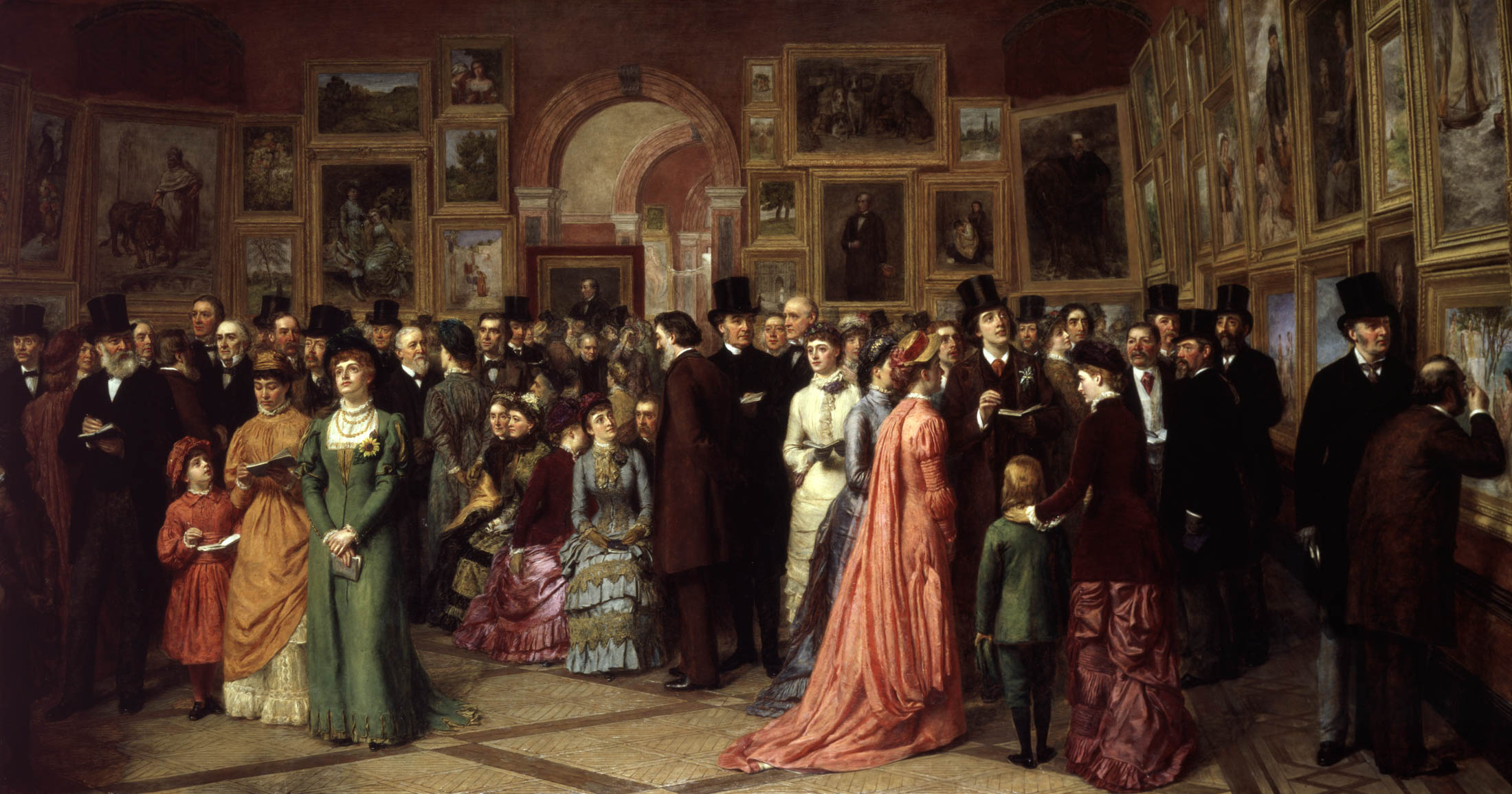
- Artist: William Powell Frith
- Year: 1883
- Medium: Oil on canvas
- Dimensions: 60 cm × 114 cm (24 in × 45 in)
- Location: Private collection

A Private View at the Royal Academy, 1881 is a painting by the English artist William Powell Frith exhibited at the Royal Academy of Arts in London in 1883. It depicts a group of distinguished Victorians visiting the Royal Academy Summer Exhibition in 1881, just after the death of the Prime Minister Benjamin Disraeli, whose portrait (visible in the archway at the back of the room) by John Everett Millais was included on a screen at the special request of Queen Victoria. The room is Gallery III, the largest and most imposing room at Burlington House.

Frith worked on the painting through much of 1881 and 1882. He later said in My Autobiography and Reminiscences, published in 1887, that "Beyond the desire of recording for posterity the aesthetic craze as regards dress, I wished to hit the folly of listening to self-elected critics in matters of taste, whether in dress or art. I therefore planned a group, consisting of a well-known apostle of the beautiful, with a herd of eager worshippers surrounding him."

== Meaning and content ==
The subject of the painting is the contrast between lasting historical achievements and ephemeral fads. The portrait of Disraeli represents the former, and the influence of the Aesthetic movement in dress represents the latter. Aesthetic dress is exemplified by the principal female figures, to the left, in green, pink and orange clothing. Oscar Wilde, one of the main proponents of Aestheticism, is depicted at the right, with signature lily buttonhole, surrounded by female admirers, standing in front of the boy in the green suit.

Behind Wilde, further to the right, a group of opponents glare disapprovingly at him as he speaks: painters Philip Calderon and Henry Stacy Marks, sculptor Joseph Boehm, and journalist G.A. Sala (bare-headed, in white waistcoat). To the left, behind and immediately to the right of Wilde, are the actors Henry Irving and Ellen Terry, with Frederick A. Eaton. To Wilde's left are Lillie Langtry, in a white dress, beside the soberly-dressed William Thomson, Archbishop of York. The man with sideburns looking over Thompson's left shoulder is William Agnew, picture dealer and recently elected Liberal MP for South East Lancashire, next to Lord Chief Justice of England Sir John Coleridge.

In the centre of the composition, bearded and dressed in a brown frock coat, stands Frederic Leighton, President of the Royal Academy, talking to a seated woman, Constance, Countess of Lonsdale. The head of surgeon Sir Henry Thompson appears between Leighton and the Countess. Frith himself appears in the centre of the painting, bare-headed and whiskered, directly below the painting of Disraeli, talking to two women behind the seat.

One of the two women on the other side of the seat, facing away from Leighton, is the heiress and philanthropist Baroness Burdett-Coutts. Having remained a spinster until she was sixty-six, Baroness Burdett-Coutts provoked a scandal in 1881 by marrying her much younger secretary, the American William Ashmead-Bartlett, who became Mr Burdett-Coutts. Baroness Burdett-Coutts is shown in conversation with the younger Lady Diana Huddleston, daughter of William Beauclerk, 9th Duke of St Albans. Their husbands also appear among the standing figures behind the seat. Lady Diana's husband was Sir John Walter Huddleston, the last Baron of the Exchequer and a judge of Queen's Bench. He wears a top hat, and stands just behind and to the left of poet and playwright Robert Browning, the bare-headed and white-bearded figure seen talking to an unknown woman in a green dress. To the right, listening to Browning's conversation, is naturalist Thomas Huxley (probably included due to his trenchant support for Charles Darwin, who had died in 1882). Mr Burdett-Coutts stands behind and to the right of Huxley, reading, with moustache and top hat.

At the left of the painting stands the "homely figure" of Anthony Trollope (who died on 6 December 1882), with full white beard and top hat, noting in a book as he gazes at an "aesthetic" family in the foreground to the right, comprising a woman in green with sunflower buttonhole gazing at the artworks (a professional model, Jenny Trip), a woman in yellow reading her catalogue, and a girl in orange looking up at her. Frith describes them as "a family of pure aesthetes absorbed in affected study of the pictures" with Trollope affording "a striking contrast to the eccentric forms near him." Cartoonist George du Maurier, with moustache and hat, stands immediately behind; to the left, behind him, hatless, is illustrator John Tenniel. Further left, between Trollope and the edge of the painting, are novelist Mary Elizabeth Braddon and musician Sir Julius Benedict.

To the right behind Trollope are a group of four politicians – the right-most, the Prime Minister William Ewart Gladstone, faces a bearded Sir Stafford Northcote; the tall hatless man behind Gladstone is Home Secretary Sir William Harcourt; behind and to the left of Northcote is Chancellor of the Duchy of Lancaster John Bright.

The paintings on the wall accurately reproduce the exhibits at the 1881 Royal Academy Summer Exhibition. A second portrait of Disraeli is visible on the wall behind Langtry. On the wall at the right, above Wilde's opponents, is the similarly angry-looking central figure in John Collier's Last Voyage of Henry Hudson. Millais at the extreme right is looking at Lawrence Alma-Tadema's painting Sappho and Alcaeus, accompanied by a myopic connoisseur. On the left wall are Heywood Hardy's Sidi Ahmed ben Avuda and the Holy Lion to the left; James Sant's Daughters of Arthur Wilson, Esq. further right, and John William Waterhouse's A Summer's Day in Italy.

== Sale ==
The work remained in the Pope family until it was sold at Martin Beisly Fine Art in April 2019.

== Exhibition history ==
The painting has been exhibited several times:

- Royal Academy, 1883, no.163.
- Harrogate, Messre A. and J. Polak's Vine Villa, presented by Dickinson's of London, September 1883.
- Whitechapel Art Gallery, 1951, no. 44, lent by Major A. Rolph Pope.
- Royal Academy Exhibition, Winter 1956–7, no. 447, lent by A.C.R. Pope.
- Royal Academy Bicentenary 1968–9, not 449, lent by A.C.R. Pope.
- London, Leighton House, on Loan 2002–2008.
- Guildhall Art Gallery and Harrogate, Mercer Art Gallery, William Powell Frith: Painting the Victorian Age, 2006, unnumbered.
- The Watts Gallery, Liberating Fashion: Aesthetic Dress in Victorian Portraits, February–June 2015
- Royal Academy, on loan 2015–2018.
- Royal Academy, The Great Spectacle, 250 Years of the Summer Exhibition, June–August 2018, no. 3.

== Influences ==
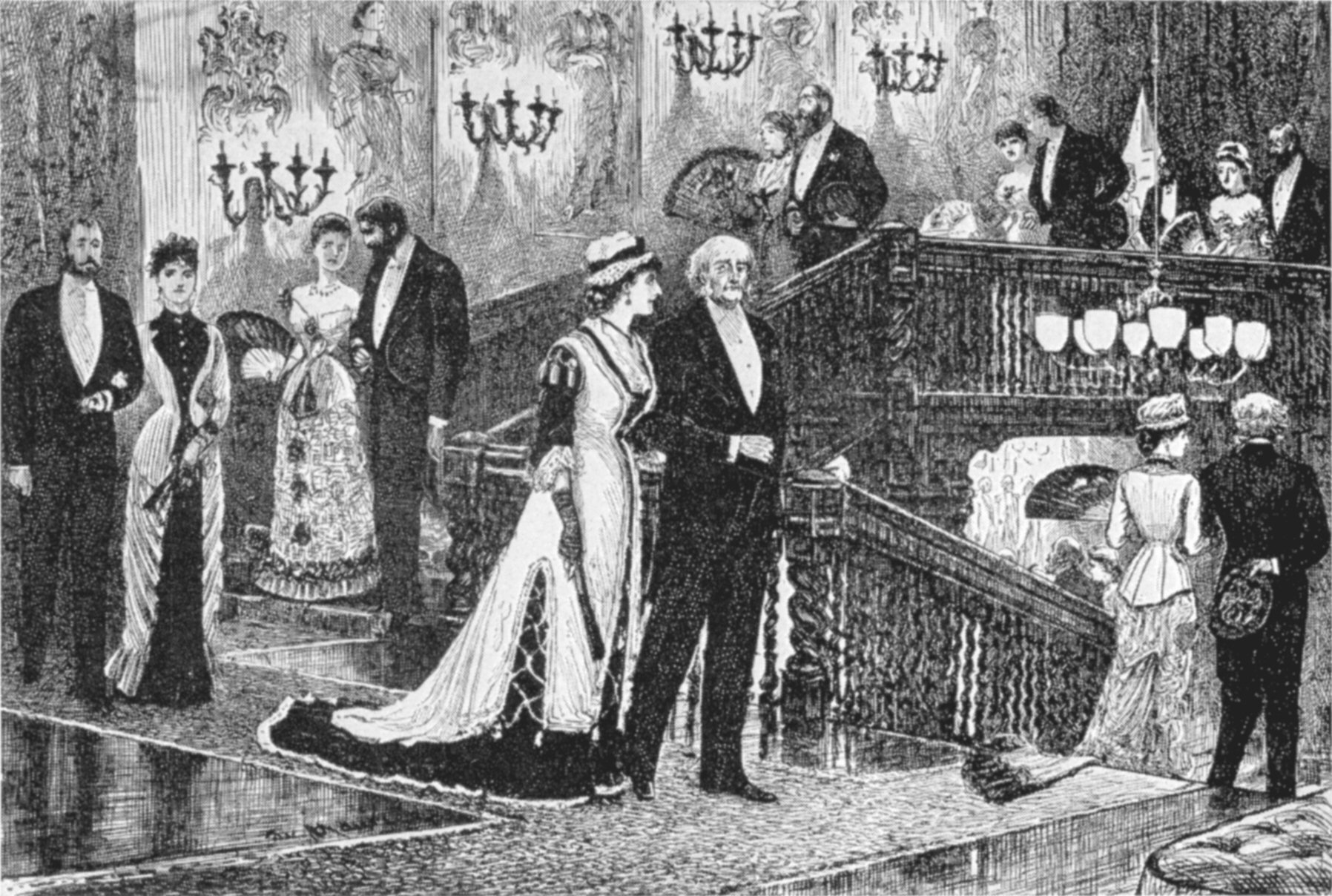
One of Du Maurier's satires on fashion

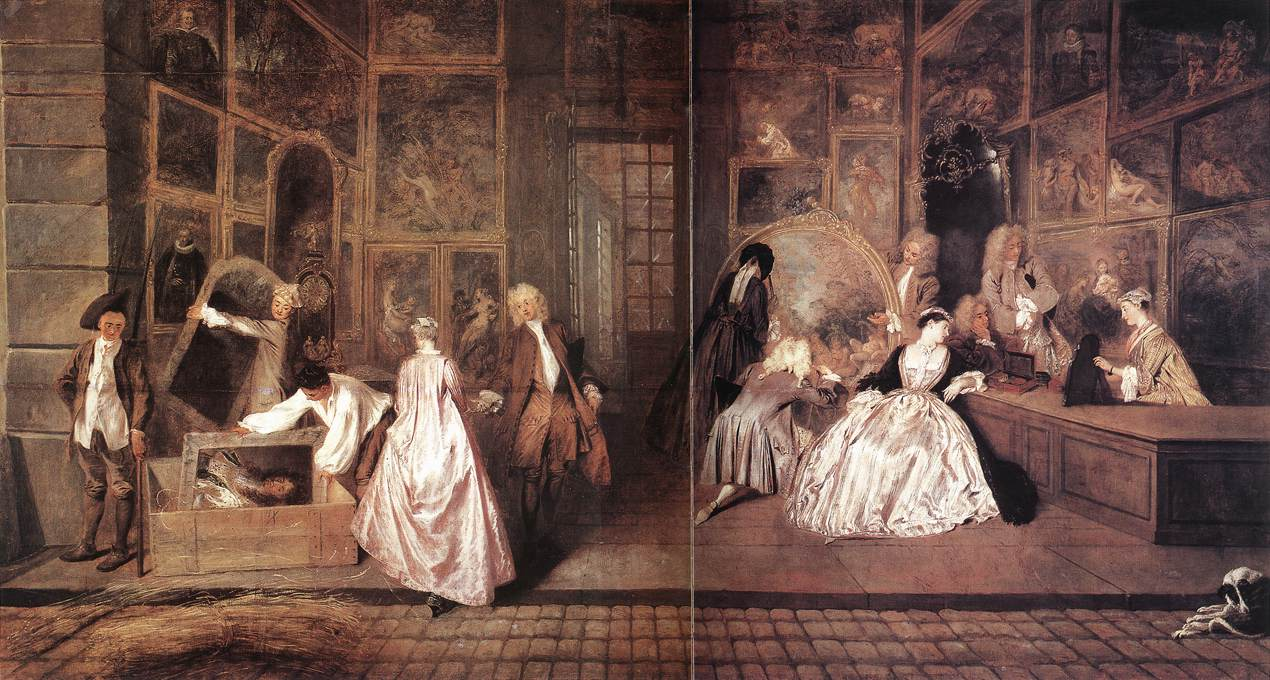
Watteau, L'Enseigne de Gersaint (1720–21)

Frith was inspired by the satirical cartoons of George du Maurier (whose head is visible between the orange and green attired aesthetes at the left) and by Gilbert and Sullivan's popular operetta Patience, first performed in 1881. The aesthetic costumes are characterised by features such as gigot sleeves and the "Watteau pleats" seen in the figure to the left of Wilde, wearing pink. The women in the centre along with the one to the right of Wilde with the child represent normal fashionable clothing of the day. These aspects of dress and pose, along with the myopic figure next to Millais, show the influence of Watteau's 1720-21 painting L'Enseigne de Gersaint.

== In Harrogate ==
A Private View was exhibited on tour. At Harrogate, North Yorkshire, Frith's childhood home, it went on show at Messrs A & J Polak's, with visitors paying one shilling to see "W P Frith's Last Great Picture". Frith's study for A Private View, 1881, is in the Mercer Art Gallery in Harrogate. This sketch offers a rare insight into the artist's working methods and also provides a snapshot of the buzz and excitement of the flourishing Victorian art world. The painting returned to Harrogate in 2007 for the first major exhibition of Frith's work since the artist's death.

== See also ==
- Artistic Dress
- Victorian dress reform
- Private view
