= Bernard II van Risamburgh =

French master cabinetmaker of Dutch origin

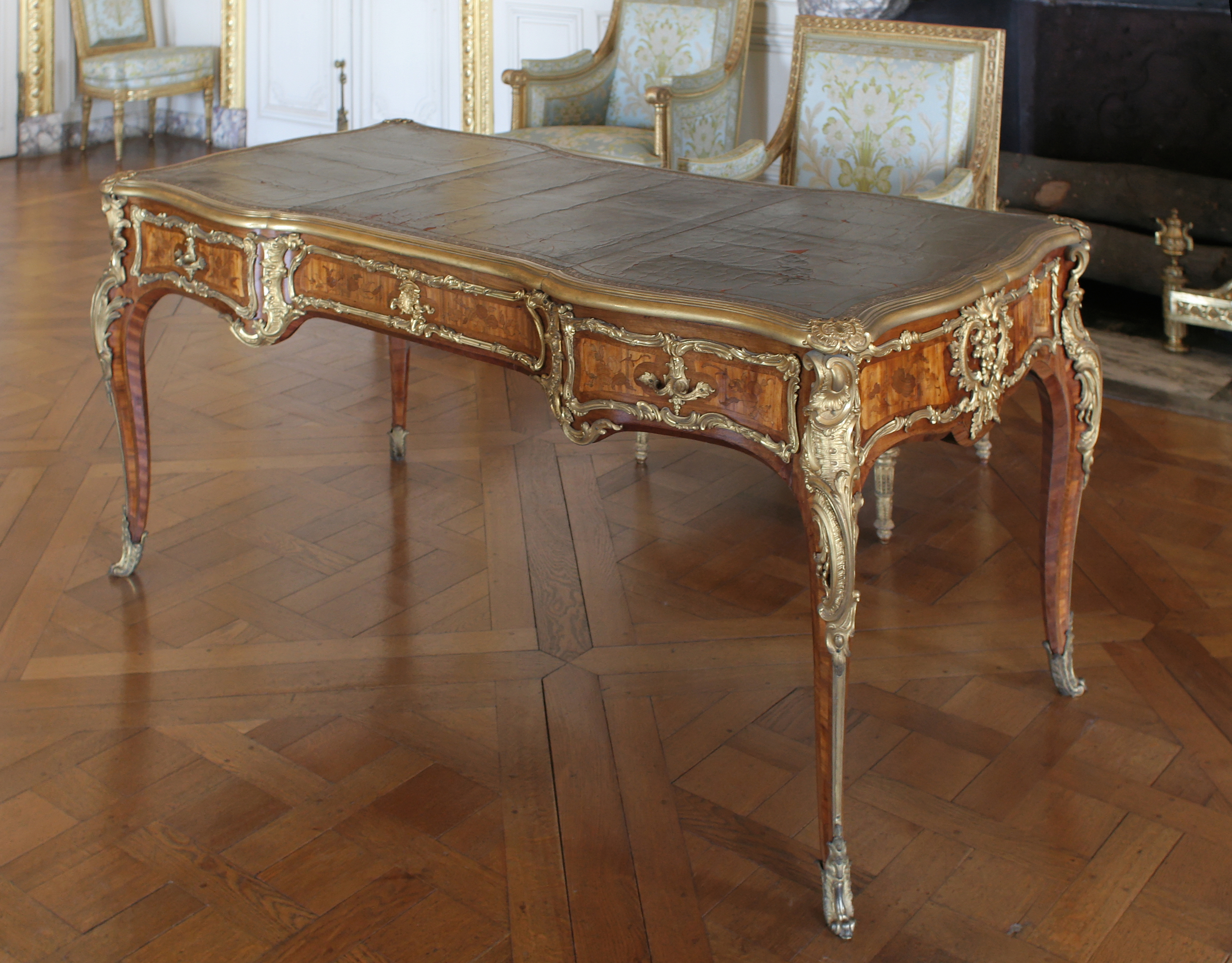
Bureau plat by BVRB, delivered in 1745 for the Grand cabinet du Dauphin, Versailles

Bernard II van Risamburgh, sometimes Risen Burgh (working by c 1730 — before February 1767) was a Parisian ébéniste of Dutch and French extraction, one of the outstanding cabinetmakers working in the Rococo style. "Bernard II's furniture is brilliant in almost every respect. His carcasses are beautifully shaped, his mounts and marquetry are always in complete balance even when extremely elaborate, and there is a logic to his works that allows the eye to comprehend them effortlessly," wrote Ted Dell.

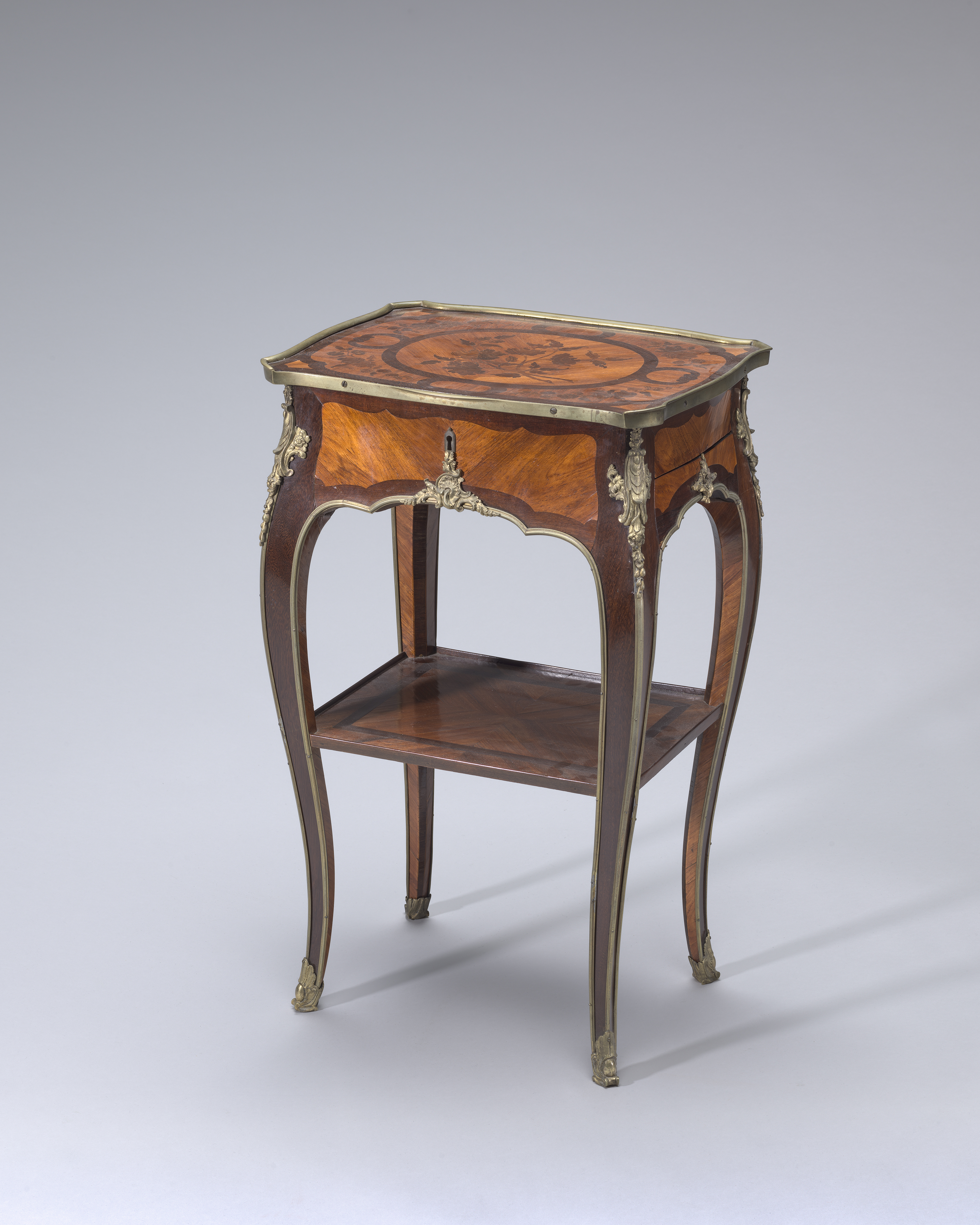
Work and Writing Table (table en chiffonnière), c. 1750-1760, National Gallery of Art

His father, Bernard I van Risamburgh (died 1738), born in Groningen, was already working in Paris in 1696, when he was living in the heart of the furniture-making district, the Faubourg Saint-Antoine, and was marrying a Frenchwoman. Bernard II's initials BVRB stamped into the carcasses of his furniture, as was the requirement under the regulations of the Paris guild, long masked his actual identity, though the quality of work bearing the stamp Burb showed that the unidentified maker was in the forefront of his field. Francis J.B. Watson observed that his full last name was a bit long to fit onto the metal maindron that punched the letters into the wood, often under the marble top, rather than, as sometimes suggested, a symptom of enforced anonymity that would redound to the advantage of the marchands-merciers, the decorator-dealers for whom BVRB often worked. He is the Bernard who is occasionally mentioned in Parisian sale catalogues, which fact places him in the rarefied company of ébénistes whose names were familiar to connoisseurs, such as "Boulle", "Cressent", "Oeben" and "Riesener", the only other cabinetmakers ever mentioned by name.

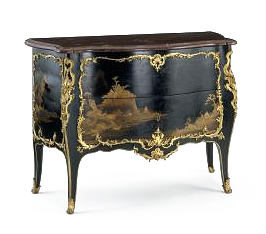
Commode, veneered with Japanese lacquer and japanned, by Bernard II van Risenburgh, Paris, ca 1750-60 (Victoria and Albert Museum)

Bernard was already received as a master in the guild by the time the sequence of surviving books begins in 1735, and he was already working for the marchands-merciers, for his stamp appears on a commode veneered with lacquer panels that was delivered by the marchand-mercier Hébert for the use of Marie Lesczinska at Fontainebleau in 1737, and the trade card of Simon-Philippe Poirier, perhaps the best-known of the marchands-merciers, is sometimes found affixed to furniture stamped BVRB. Furniture that once belonged to Mme de Pompadour also bears his stamp and can even be recognized in her portraits.

Watson credited Bernard with the introduction of marquetry of trails of leaves and flowers in end-cut quartered veneers, often of purplewood, sometimes highlighted with stained horn and ivory set in plain matched panels of veneers of tulipwood. The lacquer panels on many pieces of Bernard's output, such as the commode and two pairs of corner cabinets in the Royal Collection or the commode stamped BVRB at the Victoria and Albert Museum (illustration), or the uncharacteristically box-like pair of low cabinets in the goût grec in the Frick Collection, New York will have been supplied to him by the marchand-mercier who commissioned such pieces, for expensive Japanese lacquer cabinets and screens, to be disassembled and incorporated in the furniture, were out of the reach of a craftsman acting on his own. Their market, too, was at the point of entry, Amsterdam, as trade with Japan was firmly in the hands of the Dutch VOC Opperhoofden. An even more luxurious finish, employing Sèvres porcelain plaques, was invented by Poirier, apparently, for he maintained a monopoly of the factory's production of these;, and Bernard was the first cabinetmaker to apply them to furniture: the earliest piece bearing porcelain plaques bears plaques of Vincennes porcelain, before the manufactory was taken under official royal patronage.

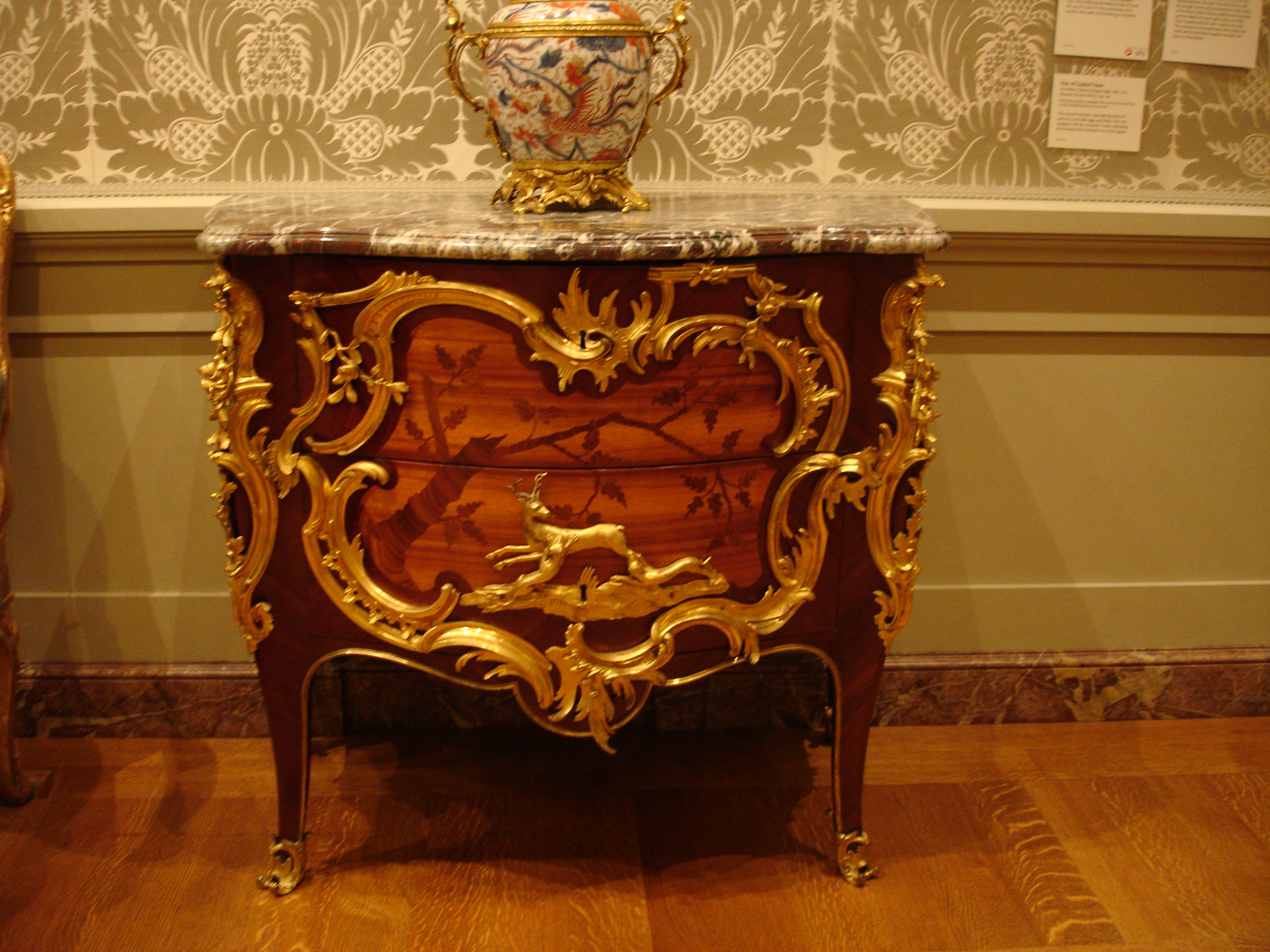
One of a pair of commodes by BVRB, c1750 (J. Paul Getty Museum)

Royal château marks and inventory numbers painted on many of his surviving works, related to corresponding entries in the daybooks of the Garde-Meuble du Roi, attest to his role in supplying ébénisterie to the Crown over more than two decades, often through intermediaries such as Thomas-Joachim Hébert and Lazare Duvaux; he also provided furniture for the marchand-mercier Charles Darnault.

Bernard removed from his late father's workshops in the Grande Rue du Faubourg Saint-Antoine to the rue Saint-Nicolas by 1752; by 1765 he was living in rue Charenton. In ill health, he retired in 1764, selling his workshop to his eldest son, Bernard III, on 18 October— it was reduced to three workbenches— and died soon thereafter. Bernard III van Risamburgh continued his workshop, but without success; he was recorded as a modeller in plaster at the time of his death, in 1799/1800. Since Bernard II's gilt-bronze furniture mounts are of distinctive designs, not ordinarily seen on furniture by other ébénistes, it is often speculated what role the younger van Risamburgh, never admitted to the guild of menuisiers-ébénistes, played in their production.

Examples of Bernard II van Risamburgh's work can be found in all the major museums. In the United States, the major assemblages of his output are the Wrightsman collection at the Metropolitan Museum of Art and the J. Paul Getty Museum.
