= Sappho and Alcaeus =

1881 painting by Lawrence Alma-Tadema

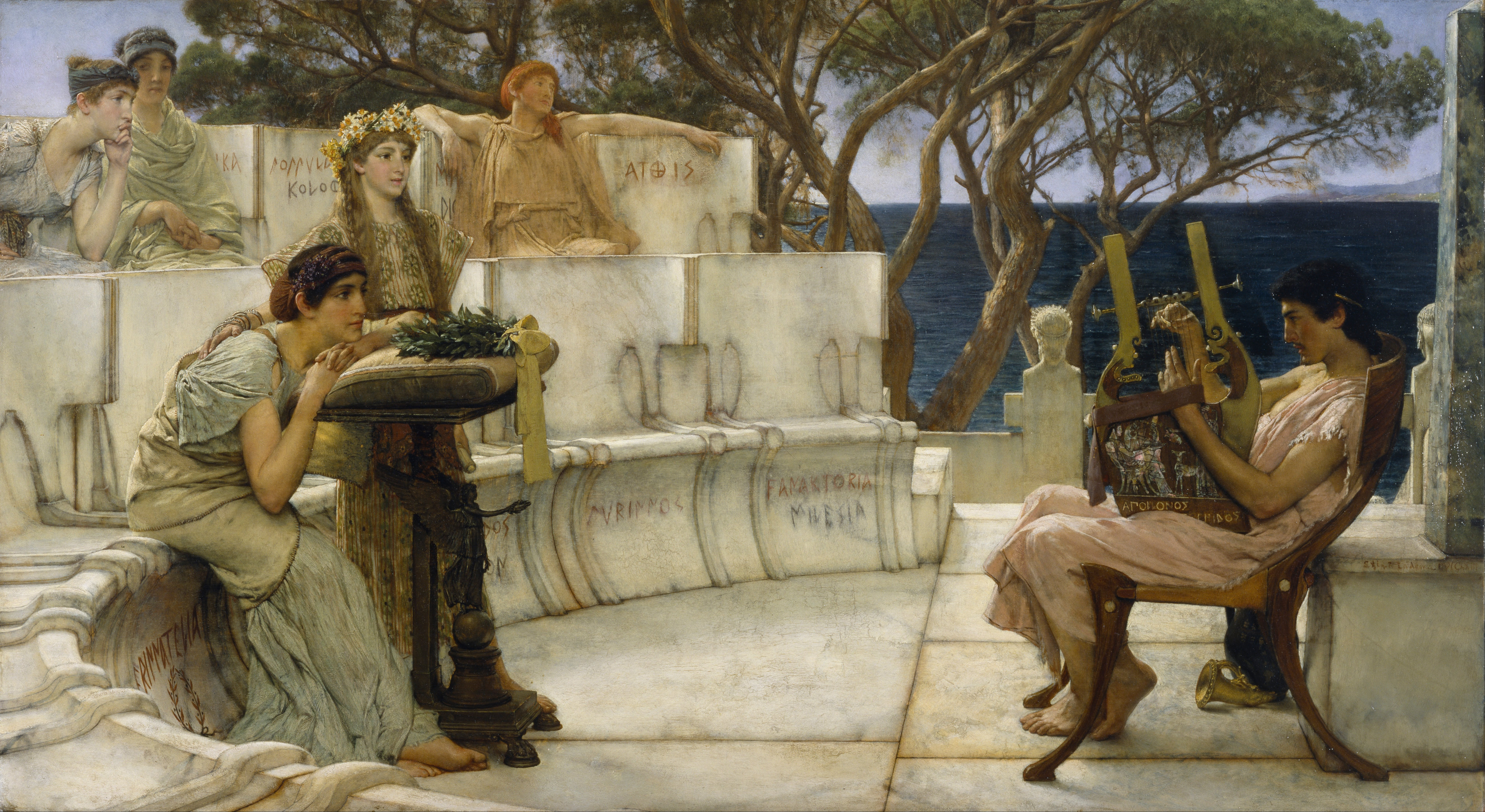
- Artist: Lawrence Alma-Tadema
- Year: 1881
- Medium: Oil on panel
- Dimensions: 66 cm × 122 cm (26 in × 48 in)
- Location: Walters Art Museum, Baltimore

Sappho and Alcaeus is an oil-on-panel painting by the Dutch-British artist Lawrence Alma-Tadema, from 1881. It is held by the Walters Art Museum, in Baltimore.

== Description ==
The painting measures 66 by 122 centimetres (26 in × 48 in). It depicts a concert in the late 7th century BC, with the poet Alcaeus of Mytilene playing the kithara. In the audience is fellow Lesbos poet Sappho, accompanied by several of her female friends. Sappho is paying close attention to the performance, resting her arm on a cushion which bears a laurel wreath, presumably intended for the performer. The painting illustrates a passage by the poet Hermesianax, recorded by Athenaeus in his Deipnosophistae ("The Philosophers' Banquet"), book 13, page 598.

The location, with tiers of white marble seating, is based on the Theatre of Dionysus in Athens, but Alma-Tadema replaced the original inscribed names of Athenians with the names of Sappho's friends. In the background, the Aegean Sea can be seen through some trees.

== Reception ==
The painting was exhibited at the Royal Academy in 1881, and depicted in William Powell Frith's A Private View at the Royal Academy, 1881, to the far right, being inspected by John Everett Millais. It was highly praised by critics: Punch described it as "marbellous".

== Provenance ==
It was acquired by William Thompson Walters of Baltimore, and on his death in 1894 it was inherited by his son Henry Walters, who left it to the Walters Art Museum on his own death in 1931.
