= Edme-François Gersaint =

French merchant (1694–1750)

Edmé-François Gersaint
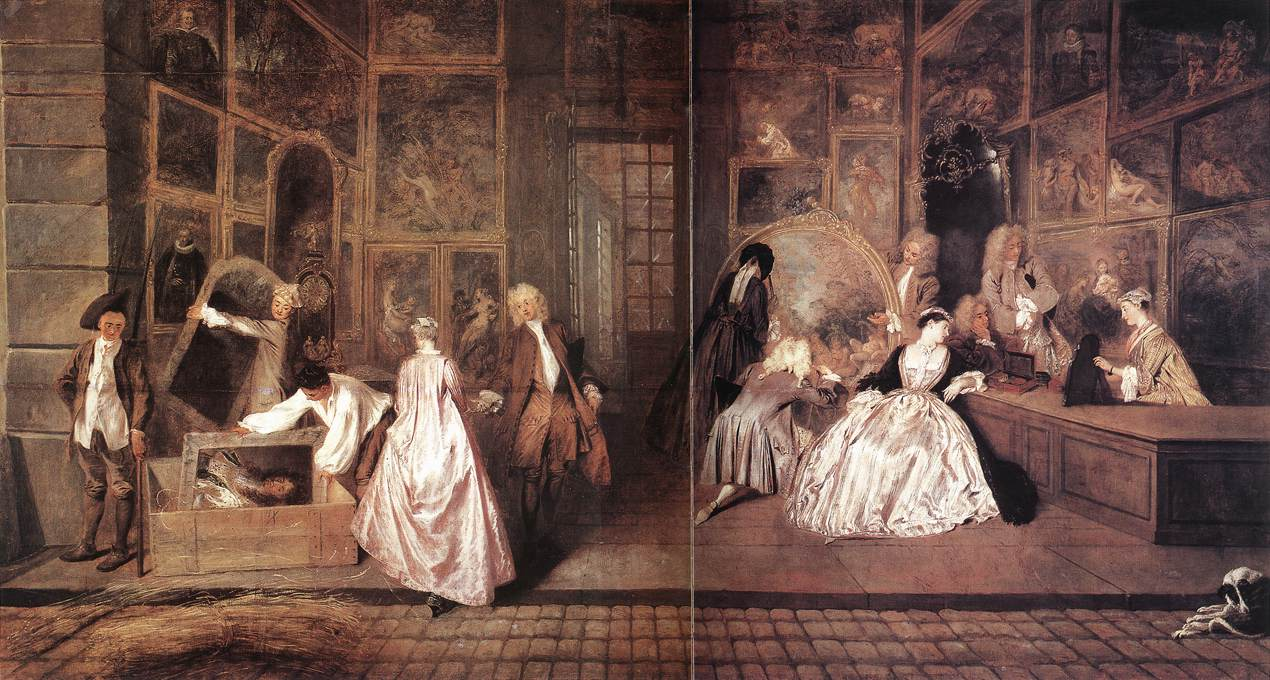
- L'Enseigne de Gersaint (1720) Antoine Watteau's last masterpiece presents an idealised vision of Gersaint's crowded art boutique
- Born: 1694; Burgundy (region)
- Died: 1750 (aged 55–56)
- Occupations: Art dealer, merchant
- Known for: Art Catalogs

Edmé-François Gersaint (1694–1750) was a Parisian marchand-mercier (merchant) who specialised in the sale of works of art and luxury goods and who is noted for revolutionising the art market by preparing, for the first time, detailed catalogs with descriptions of the work and biographies of the artist.

== Life and career ==
Edmé-François Gersaint (1694–1750) was a Parisian marchand-mercier who was a central figure in the development of the art market and the luxury trades during the era of the Régence and the rule of the rococo style. His shadowy figure has always been connected with his caring friendship with the dying Antoine Watteau, which resulted in the familiar shop sign painted in 1720, conserved at Charlottenburg, a masterpiece that provided publicity for Watteau as much as for Gersaint himself, but he had to wait until 2002 for his first in-depth biography. For his whole career, Gersaint presided from his cramped boutique, hardly more than a permanent booth with a little backshop, on the medieval Pont Notre-Dame, in the heart of the heart of Paris, both creating and following fashion as he purveyed works of art and luxurious trifles to an aristocratic clientele, an artistic creator in his own way.

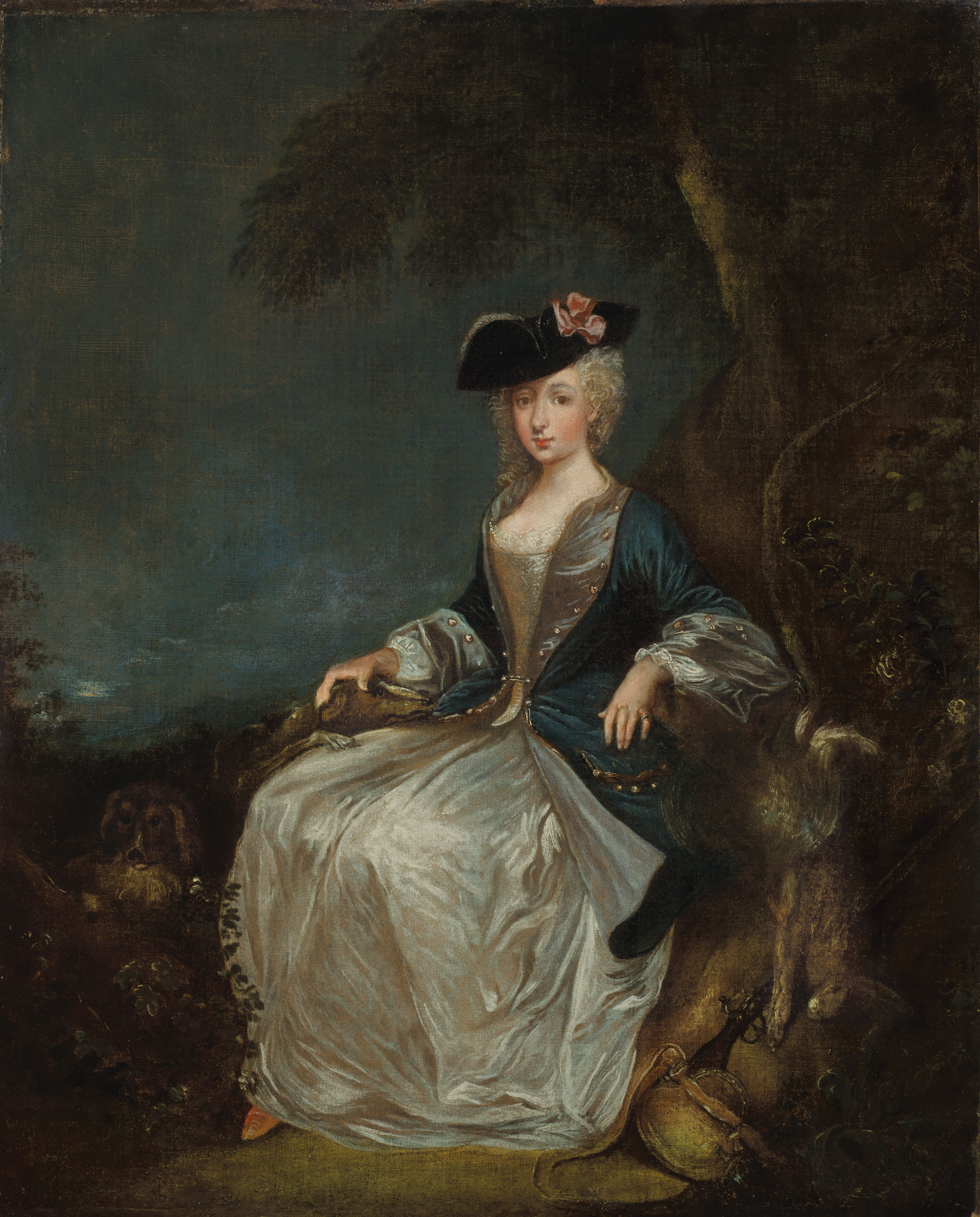
Antoine Watteau, Retour de Chasse, ca. 1715–1716, is a portrait of Gersaint's wife Marie-Louise (née Sirois; 1698-1725). Private collection

Born in 1694 in a modest merchant family of Burgundian origins, Gersaint's family relocated to Paris in the late 1690s. He was orphaned at a young age, his father, Edmé-François Gersaint died in 1707 and his mother, Edmée-Marguerite Rigault died in 1710. He was subsequently raised by an aunt. In 1716, he was apprenticed to the merchant, Charles Grimeau in le Pont Notre-Dame. He began his career as a merchant in 1718, purchasing the stock-in-trade and inheriting the clientele of a picture dealer on the Petit Pont, Antoine Dieu Au Grand Monarque, with a modest capital. Situated on the Quai de la Mégisserie at Le Pont Notre Dame, the area where the shop was located had been dominated the craftsmen miroitiers in the late 17th century, but by the time Gersaint established his shop it was in transition and becoming the home to many painters. In the same year, he married Marie-Louise Sirois, daughter of Pierre Sirois, glassmaker and merchant. He was aged 24 years and his bride, 22 years.

His shop initially dealt in European objects d'art. In around 1738, he changed the name of his shop from Au Grand Monarque to A la Pagode and began specialising in Chinese porcelain and Asian lacquers, as well as the French imitation known as venis Martin. He was amongst the first dealers to travel to Holland in search of wares, making more than a dozen trips via the Dutch East India company. He was at the centre of European collectors and merchants, attracting clientele from the aristocracy and the leading dealers of Paris.

Two inventories of Gersain's stock, taken in 1725 and 1750, revealed to his biographer, Guillaume Glorieux, the extent to which Gersaint's concerns had broadened from its inception, to concentrate as much on furniture (some 45% of the inventory valuation), exotic novelties, oriental lacquer and porcelain, tea and coffee equipages, shells from tropical seas, as on the presentation of paintings, cleaned and stylishly framed, and mirrors, during decades when Paris regarded itself as the center of civilization. He even resorted to selling licentious books under the counter to his clientele.

From the 1730s, Gersaint began to develop a number of innovative practices in sales. He was the first Parisian art dealer to use auctions for the sale of artworks and furniture, although he almost certainly borrowed this idea from Holland and Antwerp where auctions had long been used for the sale of luxury goods. He also made extensive use of advertising in the press, notably the Mercure of France. Starting in 1733, Gersaint compiled catalogues for auction sales in Paris. His catalogs were first to introduce detailed descriptions of the work and biographies of the artist. Another Parisian art dealer, François-Charles Joullain, built on his work by compiling the first index that documented provenance and the prices paintings had fetched at auctions. He followed up with a more detailed version in 1786. Between the contributions of Gersaint and Joullaint, the role of the art dealer in the valuation process was fundamentally transformed. Whereas art historians and curators were responsible for evaluating a painting's artistic merit, the dealer was responsible for evaluating a work's provenance. Thus, the art dealer was transformed into an expert.

Gersaint notably catalogued the collections of Quentin de Lorangère (2 March 1744), Antoine de la Roque (22 April 1745), and Angran, vicomte de Fonspertuis (17 December 1747); artists' biographies were appended to Gersaint's extended descriptions of their work. Gersaint's Catalogue raisonné de toutes les piėces qui forment l'oeuvre de Rembrandt (published posthumously, Paris, 1751), was the first catalogue raisonné of a single artist's graphic work, addressing at length the connoisseurship issues in distinguishing Rembrandt's work from that of his pupils in a chapter on doubtful attributions.

== Gersaint's shop ==
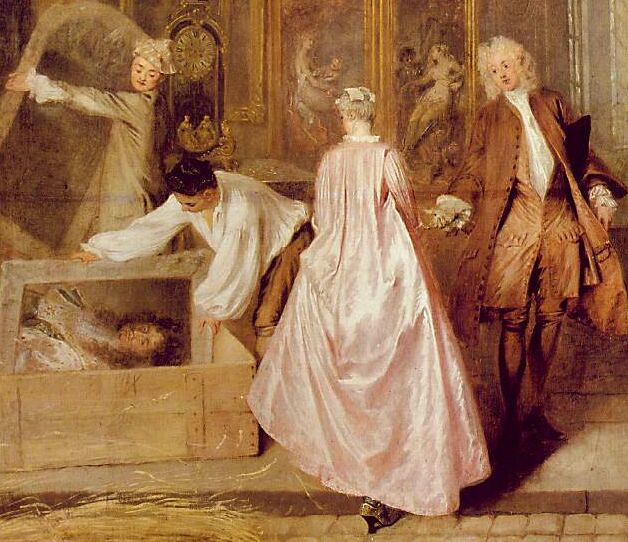
Detail from L’Enseigne de Gersaint

Gersaint's boutique shop in Paris achieved renown beyond its time due to a painting, L’Enseigne de Gersaint made by the artist, Jean-Antoine Watteau (1684-1721). (It was to be the artist's final picture as he was suffering from consumption at the time of preparing it and died just months after finishing the work. (See picture L'Enseigne de Gersaint above and detail at left.) L'Enseign (1720) is a painting depicting the interior of Gersaint's shop, it was originally intended to be used as a retail sign placed over the shop entrance, but was only displayed for a fortnight before being removed. It was much admired by Parisians during its brief period on display. Following its removal, the painting languished for a time in a store-room, was eventually sold to Frederick the Great of Prussia and is now on display in Berlin. The sign shows the shop interior, richly stocked with works of art in gilded frames, furniture, etchings, and curiosities along with a cast of eight elegantly dressed characters who appear to be discussing the artwork and subjecting the works to their critical eye.

The painting exaggerates the size of Gersaint's cramped boutique, which in reality was hardly more than a permanent booth with a little backshop, on the medieval Pont Notre-Dame, in the heart of Paris. It also depicts patrons dressed for a 15th-century royal court which suggests that it presented an idealised view of the past. Historians have pointed to the primitive nature of shops in early 18th-century Paris, noting that shops situated at Quai de la Mégisserie at Le Pont Notre Dame rarely had shopfronts. Assuming this to be the case for Gersaint's dealership, the staff would have been obliged to cart the inventory into a back room every day. The painting shows that the walls were of bare stone, rather than the plastered interior which was already being used in London at this time. Nevertheless, Gersaint created a following as he purveyed works of art and luxurious trifles for an aristocratic clientele.

== See also ==
- Merchant
- Retail

== Works ==
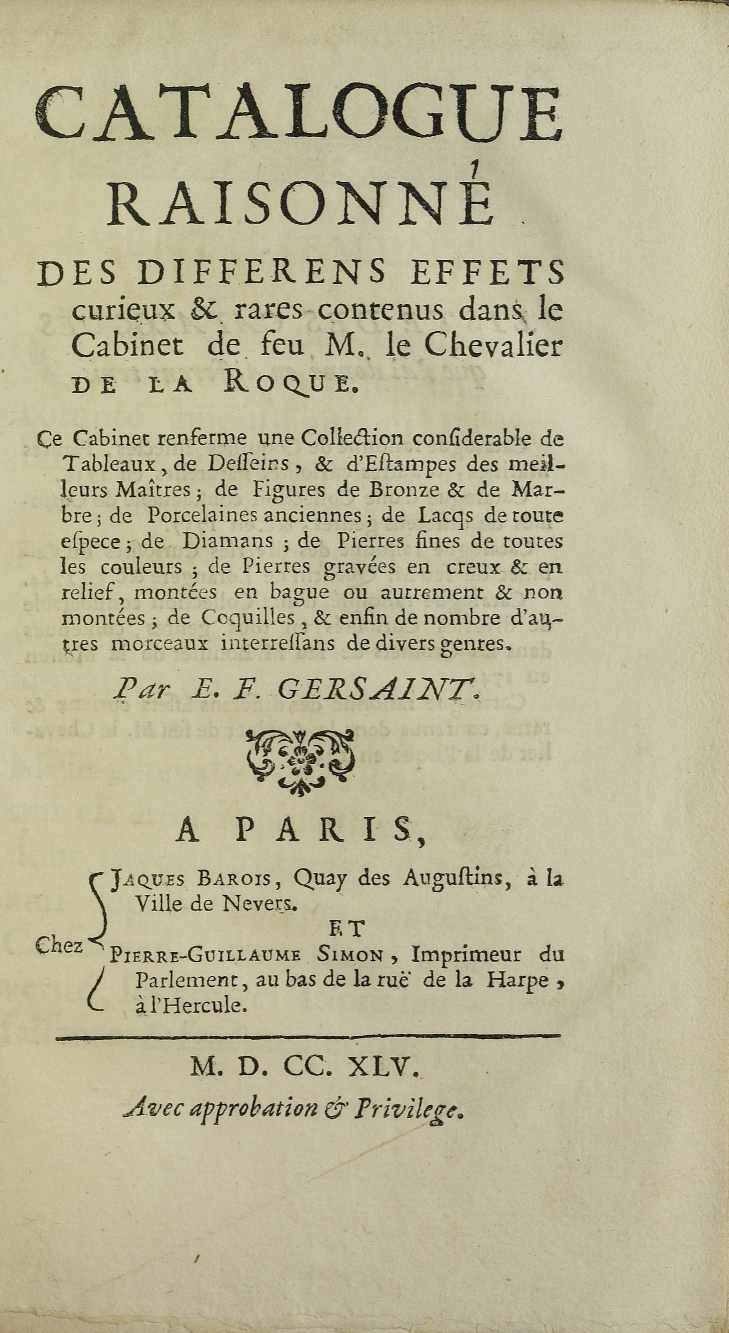
Catalogue raisonné des differens effets curieux & rares contenus dans le cabinet de feu m. le chevalier de La Roque, 1745

- Catalogue raisonné des differens effets curieux & rares contenus dans le cabinet de feu m. le chevalier de La Roque (in French). Paris: Jacques Barois & Pierre Guillaume Simon. 1745.
