= Thomas-Joachim Hébert =

Thomas-Joachim Hébert (1687–1773) was a leading Parisian marchand-mercier supplying the court (suivant le Cour) of Louis XV.

In the 1720s, Hébert commissioned furniture from the workshops of André-Charles Boulle. Among the ébénistes working to his commissions in later days was Bernard II van Risamburgh; about 1750, he supplied furniture by Bernard to the minister Jean-Baptiste de Machault d'Arnouville, some of which can be traced in modern collections.

== See also ==
- Lazare Duvaux
