= Marchand-mercier =

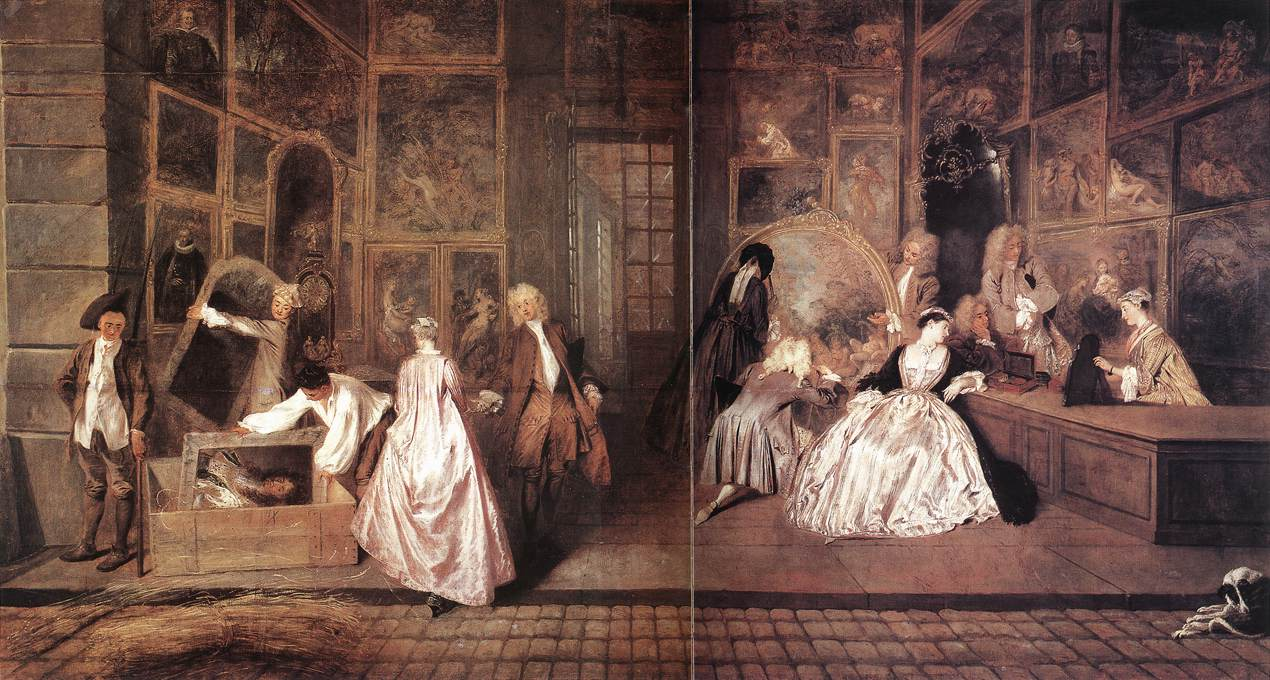
Edme-François Gersaint's shop, in Antoine Watteau's L'Enseigne de Gersaint, in form a shop sign, though never used as such.

A marchand-mercier is a French term for a type of entrepreneur working outside the guild system of craftsmen but carefully constrained by the regulations of a corporation under rules codified in 1613. The reduplicative term literally means a merchant of merchandise, but in the 18th century took the connotation of a merchant of objets d'art. Earliest references to this Corps de la Ville de Paris can be found at the close of the 16th century, but in the 18th century marchands-merciers were shopkeepers but they also played an important role in the decoration of Paris homes. In fact, they served as general contractors, designing and commissioning pieces of the most fashionable furniture, and often, in addition, worked outside of their shops as interior decorators, responsible for many aspects of a room's decor. In Paris, the guild system, in place since the late Middle Ages, prohibited craftsmen from working with any material with which they had not undergone a formal apprenticeship. Only a marchand-mercier who worked outside of the guild system, therefore, could mount Chinese porcelains with gilt-bronze handles and stands, fit the cabinetmaker's furniture with Japanese lacquer or Sèvres porcelain plaques, and supply furniture with opulent gilt-bronze (or ormolu) mounts.

The general lines permitted to their métier were set out under Charles IX, in 1570, as:

"Wholesale merchants, drapers and jewelers, in such way that under this status of wholesaler (estat de grossier) have been included at all times the merchants of cloth of gold, of silver, of silk... tapestries, jewellery, spiced goods, textiles, hammered copper, silk thread, hardware and the like, of which it is not permitted to have any manufacture whatsoever, but only to sell, buy, display, bedeck and beautify all kinds of merchandise"

Thus the marchands-merciers were characterised in the Encyclopédie as "sellers of everything, makers of nothing"". Jacques Savary des Bruslons elaborated this lapidary remark and revealed the disdain of his generation towards handcrafts:

"This Corporation is considered the noblest and most excellent of all the Corporations of Merchants, all the more because those who compose it do not labour at all and make no handiwork, if it were not to beautify those things that are already made and manufactured"

Though they were confined by law to no narrow specialisation, the Parisian marchands-merciers followed narrow fields— Savary distinguished twenty— following the usages of their training and their connections, in highly competitive fields dominated by fashion. Among them a small group of marchands-merciers specialised in works of art, catering to an elite circle of connoisseurs and collectors towards the middle of the 18th century, when a vogue for exoticism expressed itself in chinoiserie. Savary's Dictionnaire detailed the wares of:

"those who sell pictures, prints, candelabras, wall-lights, girandoles of gilded brass and [patinated] bronze, crystal chandeliers, figures of bronze, marble, wood and other material; cabinets, coffers, armoires, table, little tables, and candlestands put together of wood and gilded, marble tables and other merchandise and curiosities proper for the ornament of lodgings."

These entrepreneurs helped guide and even create fashions, such as that for Chinese porcelains, mounted in purely French gilt bronze, transforming a vase into a ewer with rococo lip and handle, or reversing one bowl over another, with an open-work gilt-bronze rim, to function as a perfume-burner. Only a marchand-mercier could marshal the resources required to create such objects. Marchands-merciers bought Japanese lacquer screens and boxes, had them dismantled and their wooden backing shaved down, then commissioned ébénistes like Bernard II Vanrisamberg or Joseph Baumhauer to produce furniture veneered with exotic lacquer panels shaped to fit the complex curves of Louis XV surfaces, and perhaps completed with French imitations, or entirely japanned in Vernis Martin, which might imitate Chinese blue and white porcelain decors, such as the blue-on-white ensemble of furniture Thomas-Joachim Hébert delivered in 1743 for Mme de Mailly

The influence of the marchands-merciers on French porcelain is also considerable. Lazare Duvaux alone bought three-fifths of the total output of Sèvres in 1757, representing a total of 165,876 livres. Certain forms in the Sèvres archives carry the names of well-known marchands-merciers in their designations.

Membership in the corps was carefully controlled. A new member, born in France, had to undergo an apprenticeship of three years, followed by another three as a compagnon, during which time he was bound to remain unmarried. His master could take on but one apprentice at a time, and the apprenticeships were duly enregistered at the corporation's offices in rue du Petit-Lion (rue Quincampoix). A sum changed hands, estimated by Guillaume Glorieux as averaging about 1720 500 or 600 livres, and a larger sum was owed to the corporation when the individual was received master (maîtris), some 1700 livres. There were two exceptions to this rule, made for purveyors to the Court— marchands privilégié suivant le cour— by decree of the king, and for those who married the daughter of one of the accredited merchants.

The Parisian marchands-merciers congregated in rue Saint-Honoré, marking their establishments with catchy and amusing signs; there could be found the premises of Hébert, Simon-Philippe Poirier— and later at the same premises at the sign of the Golden Crown his partner Dominique Daguerre and Martin-Eloi Lignereux— Mme Dulac, Julliot, Lebrun at the King of the Indies and Tuard au château de Bellevue. Nearby, in rue de la Monnaie, the street where the manufacture royale of Sèvres eventually chose to open its porcelain shop, were Darnault, father and son, at the sign of the King of Spain, and Lazare Duvaux. Edme-François Gersaint, for whom Watteau painted L'Enseigne de Gersaint as a shop sign had premises, following an old tradition, in a house on the Pont Notre-Dame. There, he advertised in 1740, he

"Sells all sorts of new and tasteful hardware (Clainquaillerie), trinkets, mirrors, cabinet pictures, pagods, lacquer and porcelain from Japan, shellwork and other specimens of natural history, stones, agates, and generally all curious and exotic merchandise".

A newcomer, Granchet, opened premises Au petit Dunkerque, in the Left Bank, Quai Conti at the far end of the Pont Neuf.

Among these entrepreneurial dealers and interior decorators at the apex of their profession, towards the middle of the century Hébert achieved the greatest celebrity, appearing in the popular novel Thémidore (1745) and marrying his daughter to the son of the Dauphine's first femme de chambre in 1751, in a contract signed at Versailles.
