= L'Enseigne de Gersaint =

Painting by Antoine Watteau

- The Shop Sign of Gersaint (English)
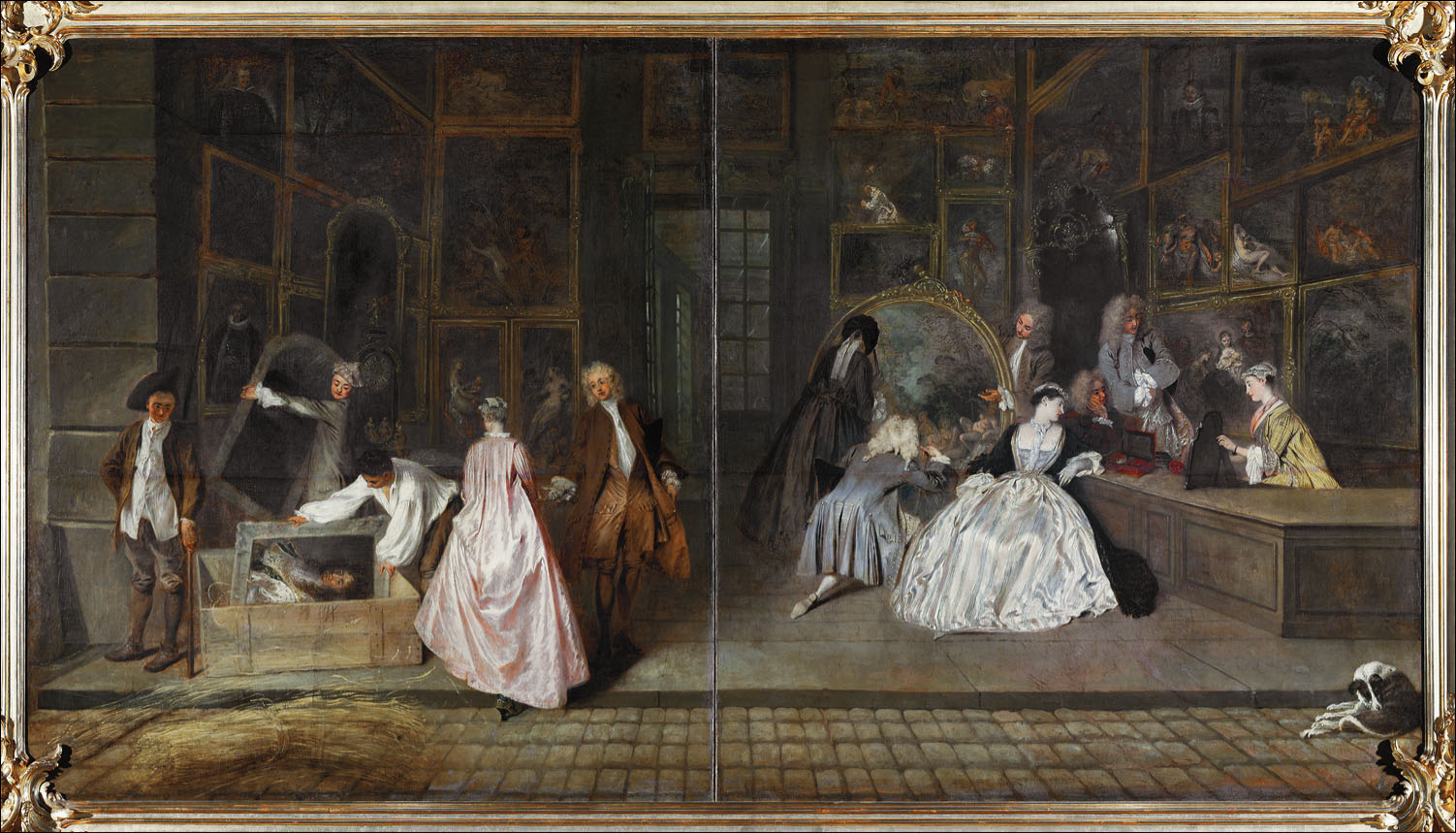
- Artist: Jean-Antoine Watteau
- Year: 1720–1721
- Catalogue: H 124 (126); G 95; DV 115; R 182; HA 215; EC 212; F A39; RM 248; RT 116
- Medium: Oil on canvas
- Dimensions: 163 cm × 308 cm (64 in × 121 in)
- Location: Charlottenburg Palace; Berlin

L'Enseigne de Gersaint (transl. "The Shop Sign of Gersaint") is an oil on canvas painting in the Charlottenburg Palace in Berlin, by French painter Jean-Antoine Watteau. Completed during 1720–21, it is considered to be the last prominent work of Watteau, who died some time after. It was painted as a shop sign for the marchand-mercier, or art dealer, Edme François Gersaint. According to Daniel Roche the sign functioned more as an advertisement for the artist than the dealer.

The painting exaggerates the size of Gersaint's cramped boutique, hardly more than a permanent booth with a little backshop, on the medieval Pont Notre-Dame, in the heart of Paris, both creating and following fashion as he purveyed works of art and luxurious trifles to an aristocratic clientele.

== Content ==
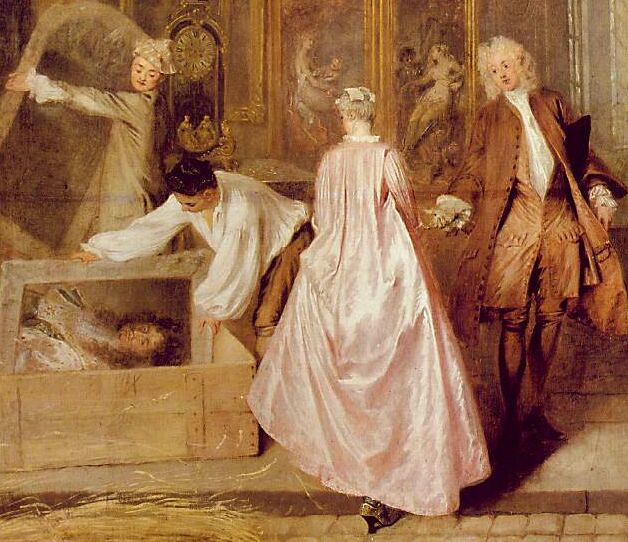
The central couple watch the boxing up of Louis XIV

The picture was originally painted on one canvas, depicting clients and staff at the shop. As a worker packs away a portrait of Louis XIV at the left, in the centre a young man offers his hand to a woman who is stepping over the threshold of the shop. At the right an elderly couple examine a painting of nudes, and a pretty young shop assistant, possibly Gersaint's wife, shows a painting to a group of well-dressed young people. In its present form, the painting consists of two separate parts, the upper sections of them were added between 1720 and 1732 by an unknown painter to transform the painting from its original, arched shape into a rectangular field. Watteau probably painted the work in the spring of 1720 when the entire entrance facade of Gersaint's shop was rebuilt. According to the study by Vogtherr and Wenders de Calisse (2007) the painting had originally covered the round field above the entrance of the shop. These changes to the building were made in the spring of 1720, the most likely date for the painting.

The artworks in the painting are set alongside the actions of high-society criticism. The young man offering his hand to the woman in pink is set against a series of female nudes, while puritanical figures in portraits at the left seem to look down disapprovingly. At the right, there are numerous images of orgies and naked figures, implying that art expresses the hidden lustful feelings of the genteel figures in the shop, who merely gaze at one another or engage in polite gestures of intimacy.

Commonly, the painting is interpreted as a commentary on the shift in aristocratic culture – or relief – that occurred during the government of the more licentious Régent Philippe II, Duke of Orléans (1715–1723), after the death of Louis XIV and before the accession to the throne of Louis XV. The boxing of Pierre Mignard's portrait of the deceased king implies the end of the old régime.

== Provenance ==
The painting never actually functioned as an external shop sign, spending only fifteen days at the shop. Watteau himself asked Gersaint to allow him to paint it, complaining of "cold fingers" that needed some exercise. It was soon bought by Claude Glucq. It was then acquired by Watteau's patron Jean de Jullienne. An engraving was made in 1732 after a small version by Pater who extended Watteau's composition for the print. It attracted the attention of Frederick the Great of Prussia. He bought the painting in 1748 (at that time already in two separate parts) from the Dutch dealer Pieter Boetgens. It remained in Germany thereafter, now forming part of the collection of the Stiftung Preußische Schlösser und Gärten Berlin-Brandenburg that display it at the Charlottenburg Palace, Berlin where it had first been displayed in 1748.

== Details ==
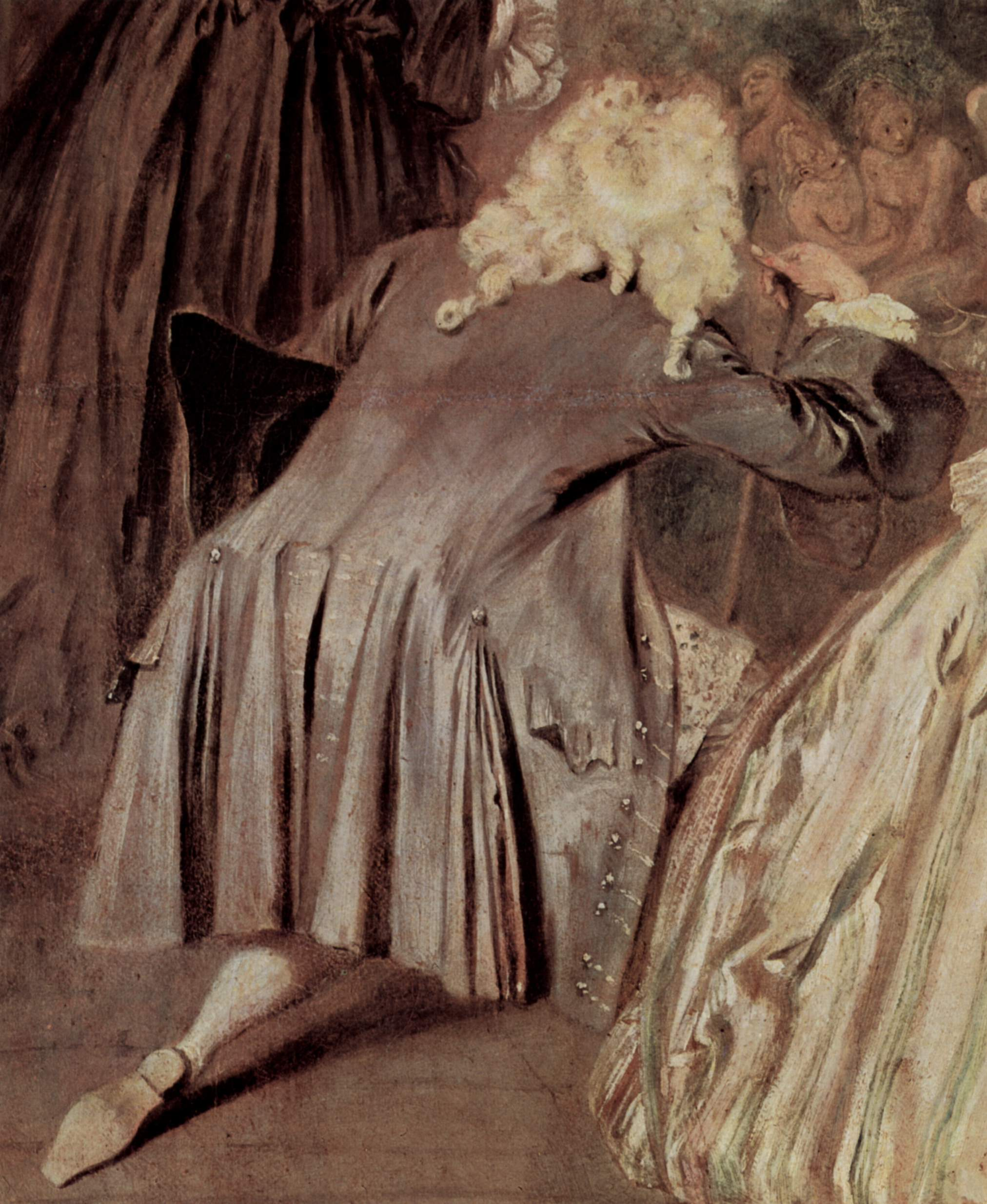
Detail

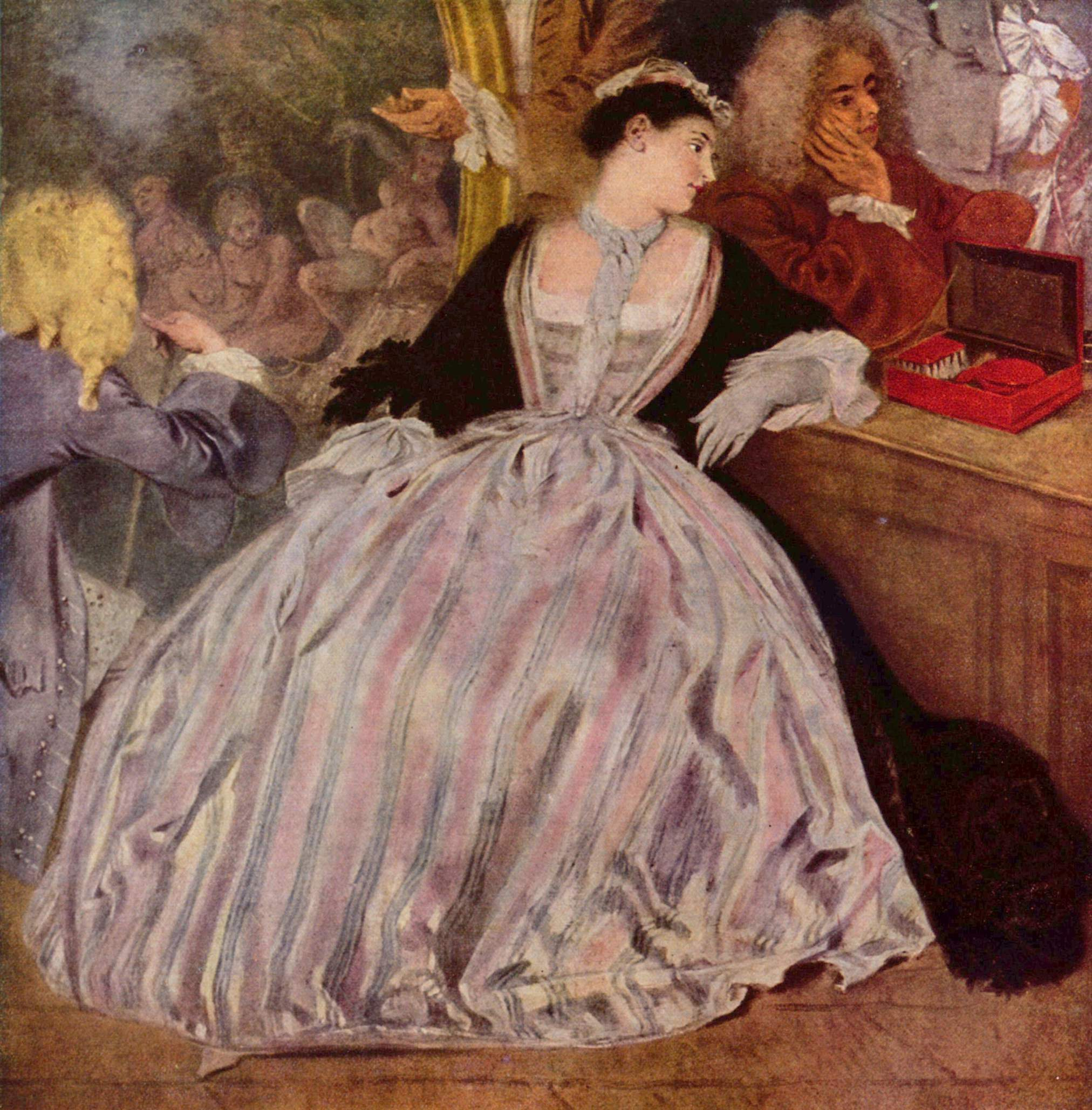
Detail

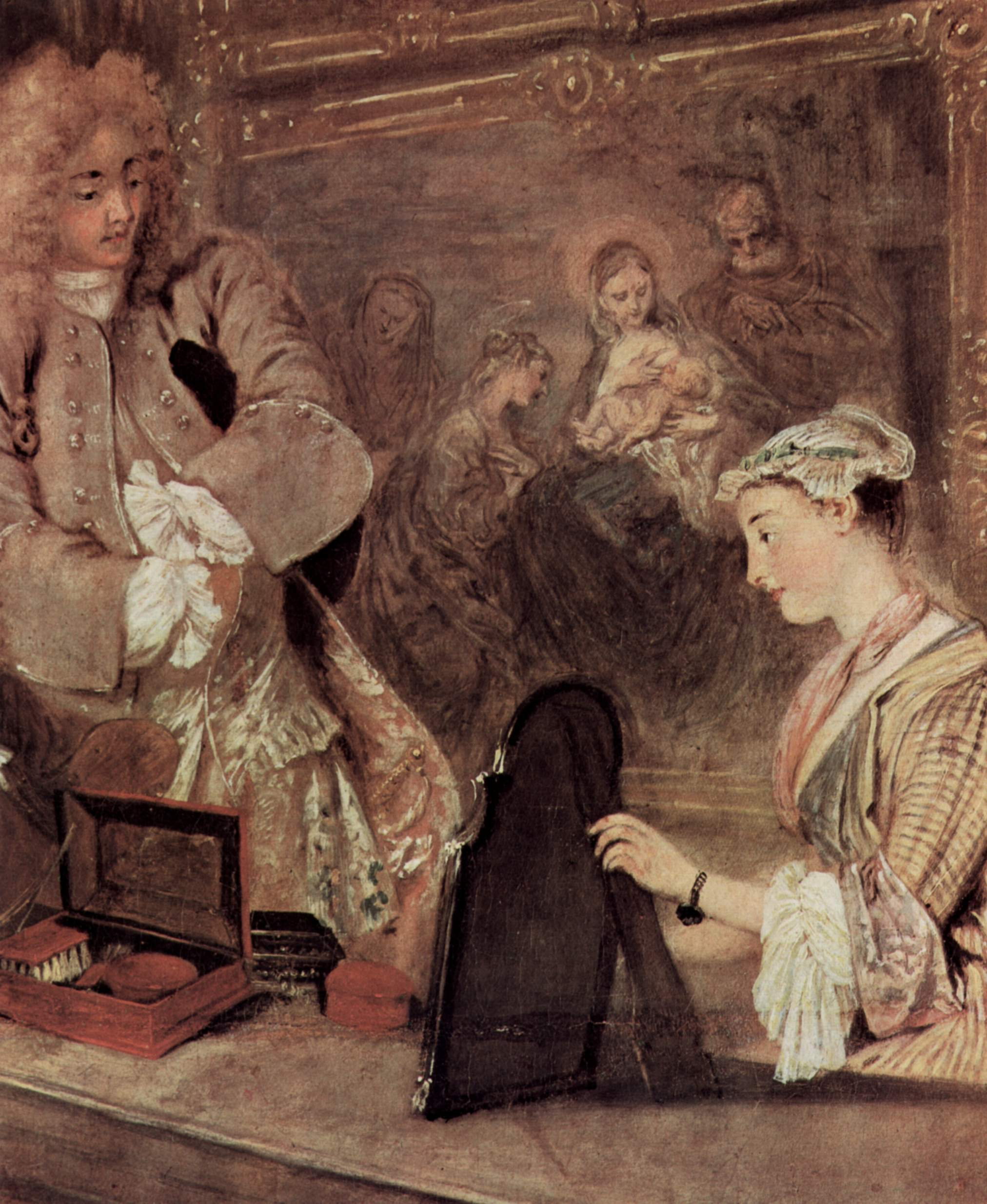
Detail (possibly Claude Glucq and Mme Gersaint)

== Bibliography ==
- Adhémar, Hélène (1950). Watteau; sa vie, son oeuvre (in French). Includes "L’univers de Watteau", an introduction by René Huyghe. Paris: P. Tisné. cat. no. 215. OCLC 853537.
- Adhemar, Helene (1964). "L'Enseigne de Gersaint. Aperçus Nouveaux". Bulletin du laboratoire du musee du Louvre (9): 7–16.
- Alfassa, Paul (1910). "L'Enseigne de Gersaint". Bulletin de la Société de l'histoire de l'art française: 126–172 – via Gallica.
- Aragon, Louis (1946). L'Enseigne de Gersaint: Hors-texte de Watteau. Neuchâtel, Paris: Ides et Calendes.
- Banks, Oliver T. (1977). Watteau and the North: Studies in the Dutch and Flemish Baroque Influence on French Rococo Painting. New York, London: Garland. pp. 231-291. OCLC 1075255658.
- Boerlin-Brodbeck, Yvonne (1973). Antoine Watteau und das Theater (in German). Basel: Universität Basel. pp. 200–202. OCLC 1965328.
- Brookner, Anita (1985) [1967]. Watteau. Colour Library of Art. Feltham: Hamlyn. pp. 13, 15, 34; colorpl. 44. ISBN 0-600-50156-6. OCLC 922565837 – via the Internet Archive.
- Camesasca, Ettore [in Portuguese] (1971). The Complete Painting of Watteau. Classics of the World's Great Art. Introduction by John Sutherland. New York: Harry N. Abrams. pp. 126–127, cat. no. 212. ISBN 0810955253. OCLC 143069 – via the Internet Archive.
- Clark, Kenneth (1970). "Watteau, L'Engseigne de Gersaint". Looking at Pictures. New York: Holt, Rinehart and Winston. pp. 75–87. OCLC 1036517825 – via the Internet Archive.
- Craske, Matthew (1997). Art in Europe, 1700–1830. Oxford History of Art. New York: Oxford University Press. pp. 172–175. ISBN 0-19-284246-3. OCLC 1147998710 – via the Internet Archive.
- Dilke, E. F. (1899). French Painters of the Eighteenth Century. London: G. Bell. p. 95. OCLC 1045594851 – via the Internet Archive.
- Gillet, Louis (1921). Watteau: un grand maître du XVIIIe siècle. Paris: Plon. pp. 184–186. OCLC 1102350703 – via the Internet Archive.
- Goncourt, Edmond de (1875). Catalogue raisonné de l'oeuvre peint, dessiné et gravé d'Antoine Watteau. Paris: Rapilly. pp. 74–75, cat. no. 78. OCLC 1041772738 – via the Internet Archive.
- Grasselli, Margaret Morgan; Rosenberg, Pierre; Parmantier, Nicole; et al. (1984). Watteau, 1684-1721 (PDF) (exhibition catalogue). Washington: National Gallery of Art. ISBN 0-89468-074-9. OCLC 557740787 – via the National Gallery of Art archive.
- Laban, Ferdinand (1900). "Bemerkungen zum Hauptbilde Watteaus: "L'Enseigne de Gersaint"". Jahrbuch der Königlich Preussischen Kunstsammlungen. 21: 54–59. JSTOR 25167411.
- Levey, Michael (1966). Rococo to Revolution: Major Trends in Eighteenth-Century Painting. London: Thames and Hudson. pp. 80–83. OCLC 1036855531 – via the Internet Archive.
- Licht, Fred (Spring 1994). "Gersaint's Shop Sign". Source: Notes in the History of Art. 13 (3). The University of Chicago Press: 36–38. JSTOR 23204894.
- Mantz, Paul (1892). Antoine Watteau. Paris: Librairie illustrée. pp. 127, 145, 185. OCLC 742536514 – via the Internet Archive.
- Mathey, Jacques (1959). Antoine Watteau. Peintures réapparues inconnues ou négligées par les historiens (in French). Paris: F. de Nobele. pp. 32, 59, 69. OCLC 954214682.
- Maurel, André (1913). L'enseigne de Gersaint : étude sur le tableau de Watteau, son histoire, les controverses, solution du problème. Paris: Hachette – via the Internet Archive.
- McClellan, Andrew (September 1996). "Watteau's Dealer: Gersaint and the Marketing of Art in Eighteenth-Century Paris". The Art Bulletin. 78 (3): 439–453. doi:10.2307/3046194. JSTOR 3046194.
- McClellan, Andrew (2006). "Gersaint's Shopsign and The World of Art Dealing in Eighteenth-Century Paris". In Sheriff, Mary D. (ed.). Antoine Watteau: Perspectives on the Artist and the Culture of His Time. Newark: University of Delaware. pp. 150–160. ISBN 978-0-87413-934-1. OCLC 185456942.
- Mollett, John William (1883). Watteau. Illustrated Biographies of the Great Artists. London: S. Low, Marston, Searle & Rivington. pp. 51-52. OCLC 557720162 – via the Internet Archive.
- Morel, Catherine (2009). "A L'Enseigne de Gersaint by Jean-Antoine Watteau: From Shop Sign to Masterpiece". In Godfrey, Tony (ed.). Understanding Art Objects: Thinking Through the Eye. Farnham: Lund Humphries. pp. 75–81. ISBN 978-1-84822-016-4 – via the Internet Archive.
- Neuman, Robert (November 1984). "Watteau's L'enseigne de Gersaint and Baroque Emblematic Tradition". Gazette des Beaux-Arts. 6.104: 154–163.
- Plax, Julie Anne (2000). Watteau and the Cultural Politics of Eighteenth-Century France. Cambridge etc.: Cambridge University Press. ISBN 0-521-64268-X. OCLC 803847893.
- Phillips, Claude (1895). Antoine Watteau. London: Seeley and co. Limited. pp. 48, 80–82. OCLC 729123867 – via the Internet Archive.
- Posner, Donald (1979). "In Detail: Watteau's Shopsign for Gersaint". Portfolio. 1 (3): 29–33.
- Posner, Donald (1984). Antoine Watteau. London: Weidenfeld & Nicolson. pp. 123-24, 148, 201, 266, 271-77. ISBN 0-8014-1571-3. OCLC 10736607 – via the Internet Archive.
- Roland Michel, Marianne (1981). Watteau: Tutti I Dipinti. I Maestri (in Italian). Vol. 19. Translated from the French by Marina Anzil Robertini. Milano: Rizzoli. cat. no. 248. OCLC 48636176. OCLC 801077589. Published in French as Tout Watteau. La Peinture. Paris: Flammarion. 1982. ISBN 2-08-012226-6. OCLC 490060827.
- Roland Michel, Marianne (1984). Watteau (in French). Paris: Flammarion. pp. 46, 51, 70–71, 109–11, 116–17, 210, 221, 265–66, 272, 302. ISBN 9782080120205. OCLC 417153549.
- Vidal, Mary (1992). Watteau's Painted Conversations: Art, Literature, and Talk in Seventeenth- and Eighteenth-Century France. New Haven, London: Yale University Press. ISBN 0-300-05480-7.
- Vogtherr, Christoph Martin & Wenders De Calisse, Eva (May 2007). "Watteau's 'Shopsign': The Long Creation of a Masterpiece". The Burlington Magazine. 149 (1250): 296–304. JSTOR 20074823.
- Vogtherr, Christoph Martin (2011). Französische Gemälde I: Watteau • Pater • Lancret • Lajoüe (collection catalogue). Berlin: Akademie Verlag. cat. no. 7. ISBN 305004652X. OCLC 505749744.
- Wine, Humphrey (April 1990). "Watteau's Consumption and L'Enseigne de Gersaint". Gazette des Beaux-Arts. 6.115: 163–170.
- Zimmermann, E. Heinrich [in German] (1912). Watteau: des Meisters Werke in 182 Abbildungen. Klassiker der Kunst (in German). Vol. 21. Stuttgart, Leipzig: Deutsche Verlags-Anstalt. p. 108. OCLC 561124140.
