= Lazare Duvaux =

Lazare Duvaux (c.1703 – 24 November 1758) was a Parisian marchand-mercier, among the most prominent designers and purveyors of furnishings, gilt-bronze-mounted European and Chinese porcelains, Vincennes porcelain and later Sèvres porcelain and all the small, refined luxuries that appealed to Mme de Pompadour, one of his most prominent clients, who entrusted the furnishing of her many châteaux to Duvaux. Another prominent client was Pierre Victor, Baron de Besenval de Brunstatt, who furnished his residence in Paris, the Hôtel de Besenval, with the help of Lazare Duvaux. Lazare Duvaux was retrieved from posthumous obscurity when his daybook covering the decade 1748-1758 was published in 1873; it remains a central document of the decorative arts of the mid-18th century.

Established in trade by 1740, he was already a marchand suivant le Cour by 1747, when he figured, as "sieur Devos, marchand-orfévre", and supplying gold boxes, among the suppliers of the king's gift of jewels to the new Dauphine for her marriage to the Dauphin. He moved his shop from the rue de la Monnaie in Saint-Germain l'Auxerrois to the fashionable rue Saint-Honoré, the center of Parisian commerce in works of art and what the French called la curiosité.
