= French art =

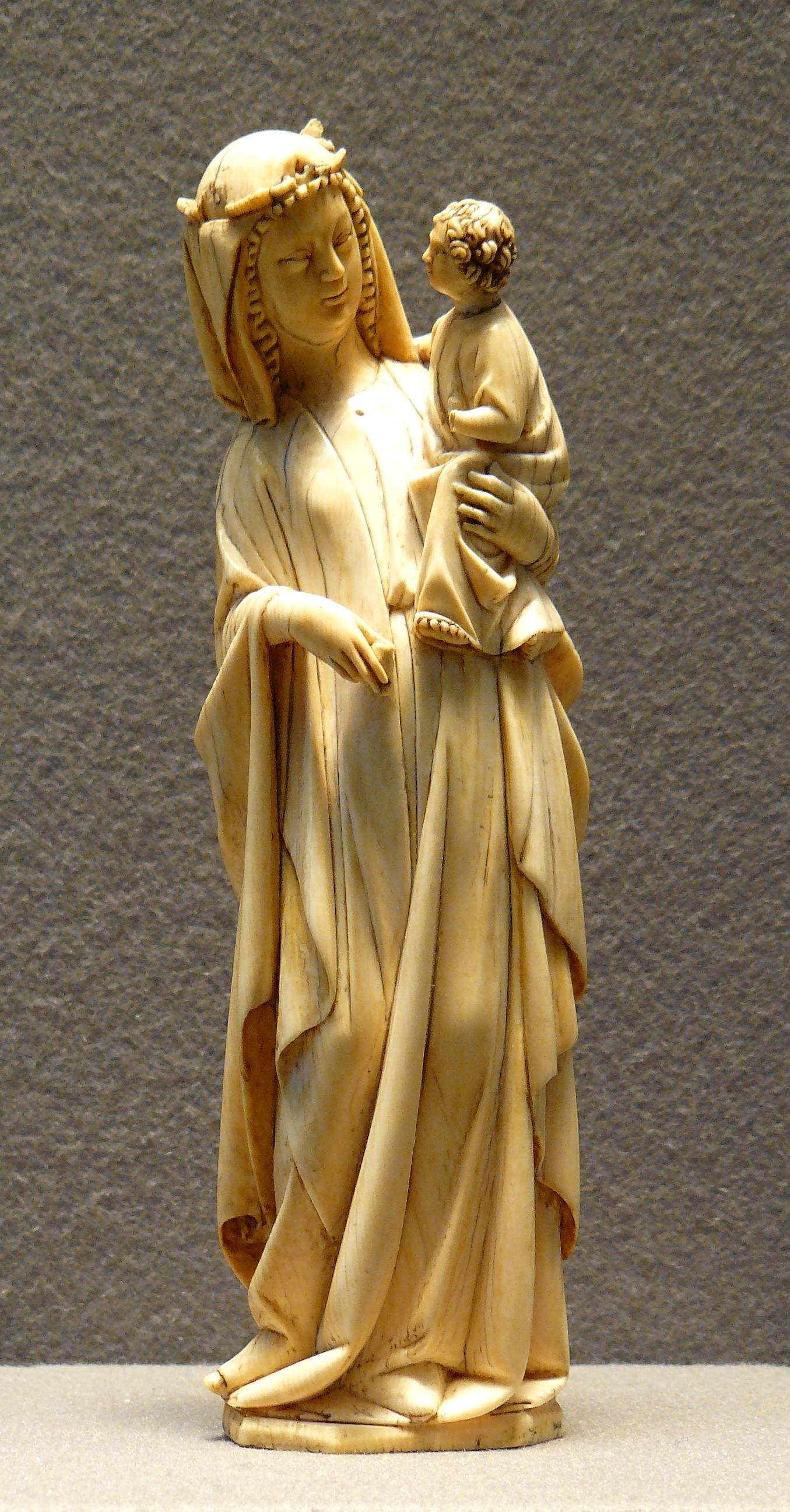
French ivory Virgin and Child, end of the 13th century, 25 cm high, curving to fit the shape of the ivory tusk.

French art consists of the visual and plastic arts (including French architecture, woodwork, textiles, and ceramics) originating from the geographical area of France. Modern France was one of the main centre for the European art of the Upper Paleolithic, then left many megalithic monuments, and in the Iron Age many of the most impressive finds of early Celtic art. The Gallo-Roman period left a distinctive provincial style of sculpture, and the region around the modern Franco-German border led the empire in the mass production of finely decorated Ancient Roman pottery, which was exported to Italy and elsewhere on a large scale. With Merovingian art the story of French styles as a distinct and influential element in the wider development of the art of Christian Europe begins.

Romanesque and Gothic architecture flourished in medieval France with Gothic architecture originating from the Île-de-France and Picardy regions of northern France and soon expanding in all of Europe. From the 16th century, the Renaissance led to Italy becoming the main source of stylistic developments until France became the leading artistic influence in France during the late phase of Louis XIV's reign, especially during the Rococo and Neoclassicism periods. During the 19th century and up to mid-20th century France, and especially Paris, was considered the center of the art world with art styles such as Impressionism, Post-Impressionism, Cubism, Fauvism originating there as well as movements and congregations of foreign artists such as the École de Paris.

== Historic overview ==
=== Prehistory ===
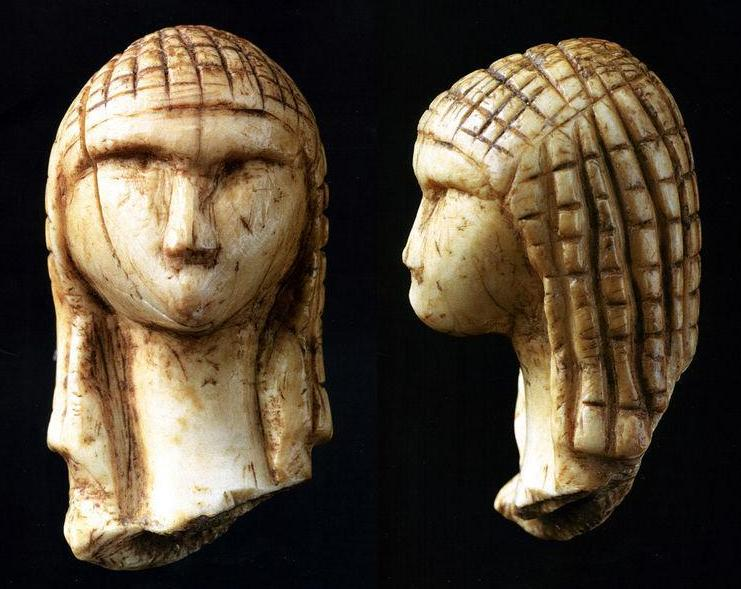
Front and side view of the Venus of Brassempouy

Currently, the earliest known European art is from the Upper Palaeolithic period of between 40,000 and 10,000 years ago and France has a large selection of extant pre-historic art from the Châtelperronian, Aurignacian, Solutrean, Gravettian, and Magdalenian cultures. This art includes cave paintings, such as the famous paintings at Pech Merle in the Lot in Languedoc which date back to 16,000 BC, Lascaux, located near the village of Montignac, in the Dordogne, dating back to between 13,000 and 15,000 BC, or perhaps, as far back as 25,000 BC, the Cosquer Cave, the Chauvet Cave dating back to 29,000 BC, and the Trois-Frères cave; and portable art, such as animal carvings and great goddess statuettes called Venus figurines, such as the "Venus of Brassempouy" of 21,000 BC, discovered in the Landes, now in the museum at the Château de Saint-Germain-en-Laye or the Venus of Lespugue at the Musée de l'Homme. Ornamental beads, bone pins, carvings, as well as flint and stone arrowheads also are among the prehistoric objects from the area of France.

Speculations exist that only Homo sapiens are capable of artistic expression, however, a recent find, the Mask of la Roche-Cotard—a Mousterian or Neanderthal artifact, found in 2002 in a cave near the banks of the Loire River, dating back to about 33,000 B.C.—now suggests that Neanderthal humans may have developed a sophisticated and complex artistic tradition.

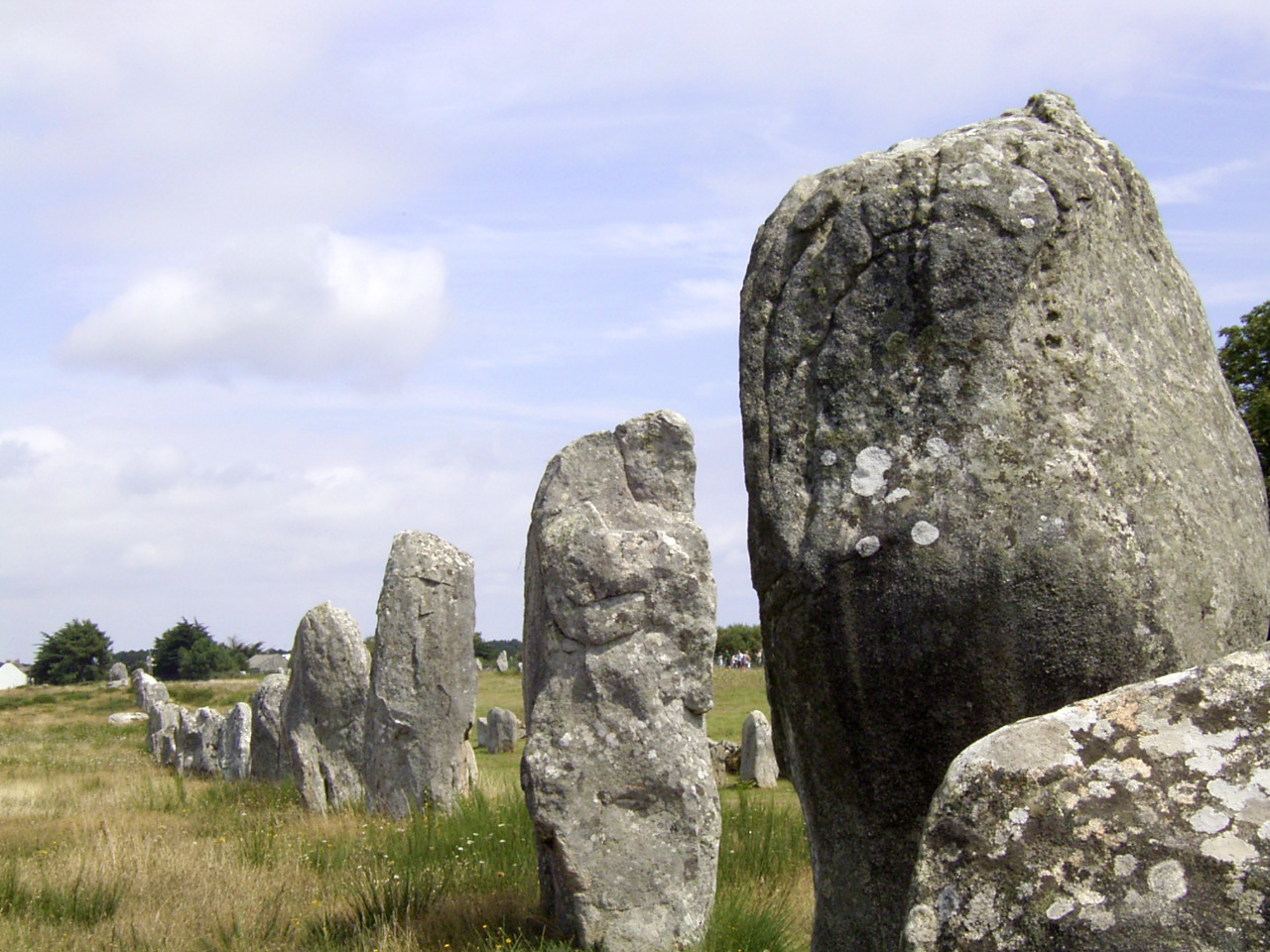
The Menec alignments, the most well-known megalithic site among the Carnac stones

In the Neolithic period (see Neolithic Europe), megalithic (large stone) monuments, such as the dolmens and menhirs at Carnac, Saint-Sulpice-de-Faleyrens and elsewhere in France begin to appear; this appearance is thought to start in the fifth millennium BC, although some authors speculate about Mesolithic roots. In France there are some 5,000 megalithic monuments, mainly in Brittany, where there is the largest concentration of these monuments. In this area there is a wide variety of these monuments that have been well preserved, such as menhirs, dolmens, cromlechs and cairns. The Cairn of Gavrinis in southern Brittany is an outstanding example of megalithic art : its 14 meters inner corridor is nearly completely adorned with ornamental carvings. The great broken menhir of Er-Grah, now in four pieces, was more than 20 meters high originally, making it the largest menhir ever erected. France also has numerous painted stones, polished stone axes, and inscribed menhirs from this period. The Grand-Pressigny area was known for its precious silex blades and they were extensively exported during the Neolithic.

In France from the Neolithic to the Bronze Age, one finds a variety of archaeological cultures, including the Rössen culture of c. 4500–4000 BC, Beaker culture of c. 2800–1900 BC, Tumulus culture of c. 1600–1200 BC, Urnfield culture of c. 1300–800 BC, and, in a transition to the Iron Age, Hallstatt culture of c. 1200–500 BC.

For more on Prehistoric sites in Western France, see Prehistory of Brittany.

=== Celtic and Roman periods ===
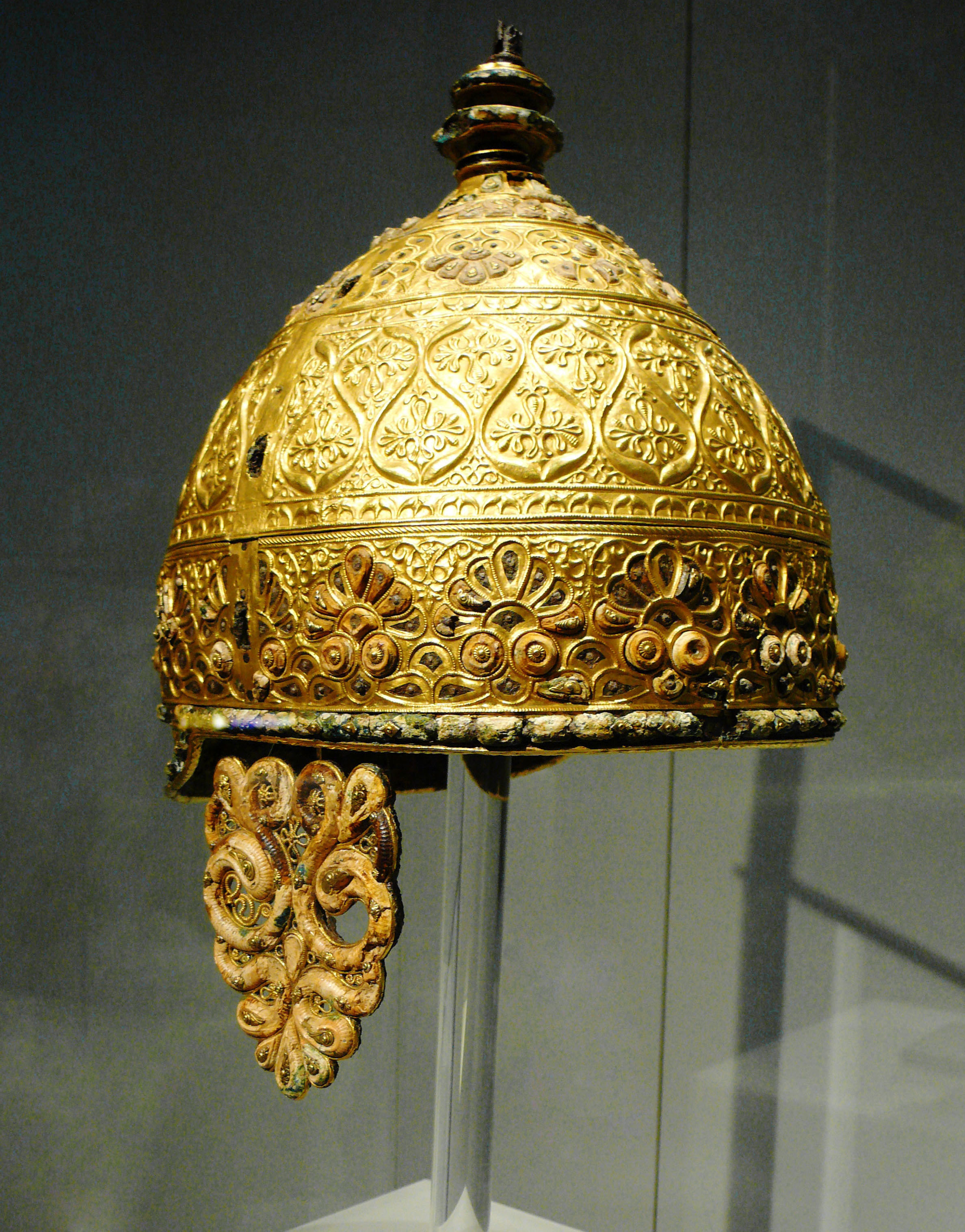
Agris Helmet

From the Proto-Celtic Urnfield and Hallstatt cultures, a continental Iron Age Celtic art developed; mainly associated with La Tène culture, which flourished during the late Iron Age from 450 BC to the Roman conquest in the first century BC. This art drew on native, classical and perhaps, the Mediterranean, oriental sources. The Celts of Gaul are known through numerous tombs and burial mounds found throughout France.

Celtic art is very ornamental, avoiding straight lines and only occasionally using symmetry, without the imitation of nature nor ideal of beauty central to the classical tradition, but apparently, often involves complex symbolism. This artwork includes a variety of styles and often incorporates subtly modified elements from other cultures, an example being the characteristic over-and-under interlacing which arrived in France only in the sixth century, although it was already used by Germanic artists. The Celtic Vix grave in present-day Burgundy revealed the largest bronze crater of the Antiquity, that was probably imported by Celtic aristocrats from Greece.

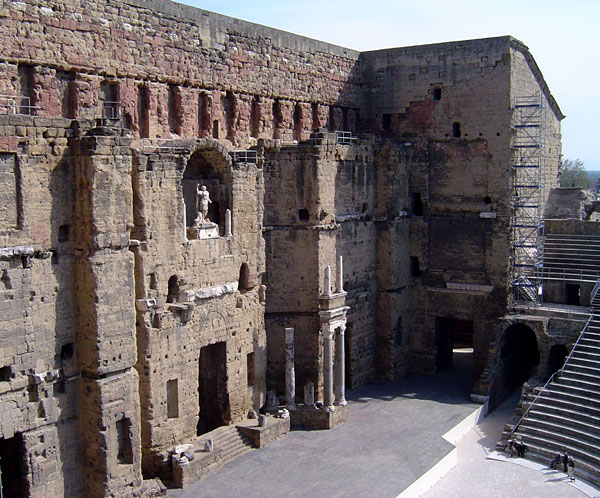
Théâtre antique d'Orange

The region of Gaul (Latin: Gallia) came under the rule of the Roman Empire from the first century BC to the fifth century AD. Southern France, and especially Provence and Languedoc, is known for its many intact Gallo-Roman monuments. Lugdunum, modern Lyon, was at the time of the Roman Empire the largest city outside Italy and gave birth to two Roman Emperors. The city still boasts some Roman remains including a Theater. Monumental works from this period include the amphitheater in Orange, Vaucluse, the "Maison Carrée" at Nîmes which is one of the best preserved Roman temples in Europe, the city of Vienne near Lyon, which features an exceptionally well preserved temple (the temple of Augustus and Livia), a circus as well as other remains, the Pont du Gard aqueduct which is also in an exceptional state of preservation, the Roman cities of Glanum and Vaison-la-Romaine, two intact Gallo-Roman arenas in Nîmes and Arles, and the Roman baths, and the arena of Paris.

=== Medieval period ===
==== Merovingian art ====
Merovingian art is the art and architecture of the Merovingian dynasty of the Franks, which lasted from the fifth century to the eighth century in present-day France and Germany. The advent of the Merovingian dynasty in Gaul during the fifth century led to important changes in the arts. In architecture, there was no longer the desire to build robust and harmonious buildings. Sculpture regressed to being little more than a simple technique for the ornamentation of sarcophagi, altars, and ecclesiastical furniture. On the other hand, the rise of gold work and manuscript illumination brought about a resurgence of Celtic decoration, which, with Christian and other contributions, constitutes the basis of Merovingian art. The unification of the Frankish kingdom under Clovis I (465–511) and his successors, corresponded with the need to build churches. The plans for them probably were copied from Roman basilicas. Unfortunately, these timber structures have not survived because of destruction by fire, whether accidental or caused by the Normans at the time of their incursions.

==== Carolingian art ====
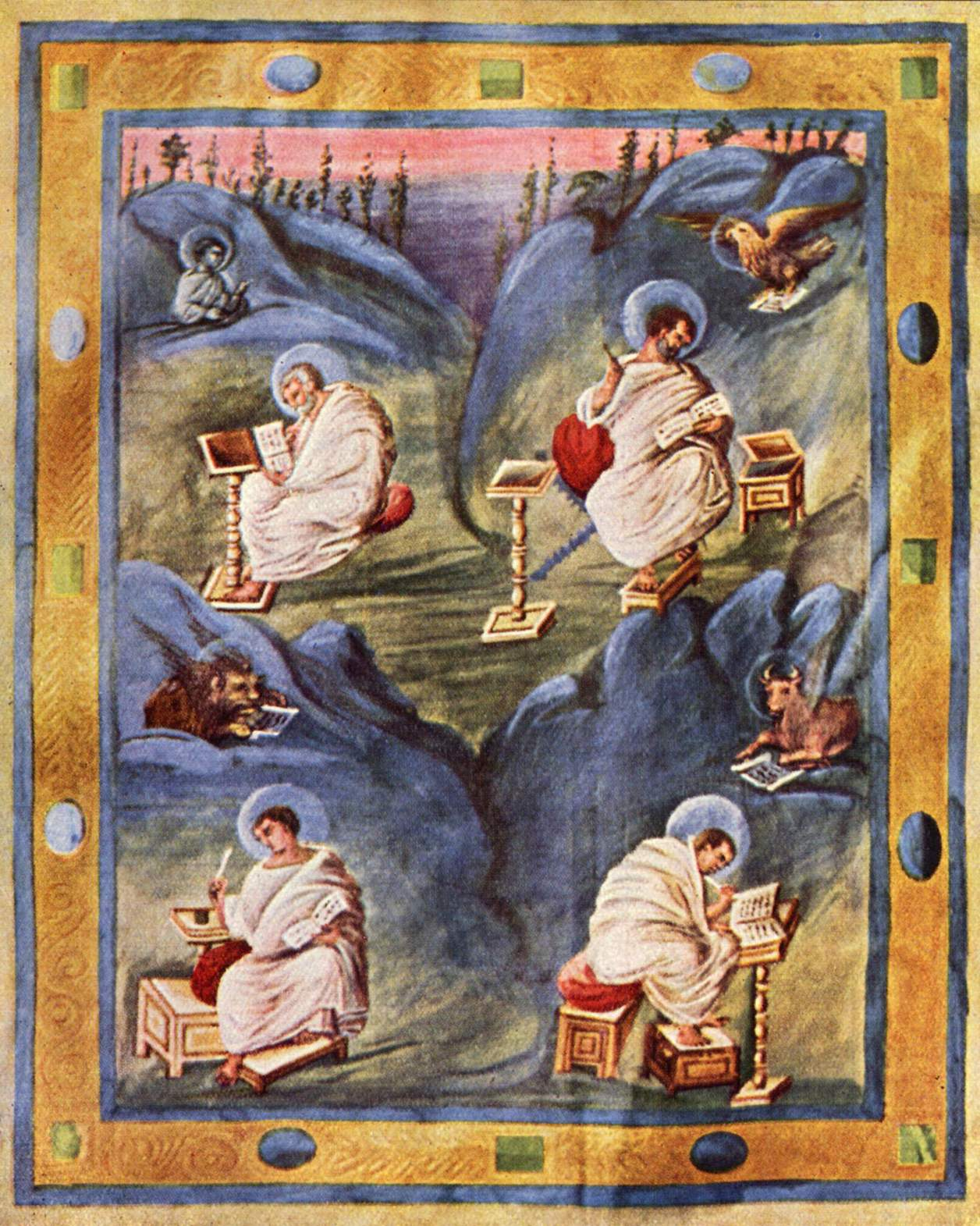
Aachen Gospels, c. 820, an example of Carolingian illumination

Carolingian art is the approximate 120-year period from 750 to 900—during the reign of Charles Martel, Pippin the Younger, Charlemagne, and his immediate heirs—popularly known as the Carolingian Renaissance. The Carolingian era is the first period of the medieval art movement known as Pre-Romanesque. For the first time, Northern European kings patronized classical Mediterranean Roman art forms, blending classical forms with Germanic ones, creating entirely new innovations in figurine line drawing, and setting the stage for the rise of Romanesque art and, eventually, Gothic art in the West.

Illuminated manuscripts, metalwork, small-scale sculpture, mosaics, and frescos survive from the period. The Carolingians also undertook major architectural building campaigns at numerous churches in France. These include those of Metz, Lyon, Vienne, Le Mans, Reims, Beauvais, Verdun, Saint-Germain in Auxerre, Saint-Pierre in Flavigny, and Saint-Denis, as well as the town center of Chartres. The Centula Abbey of Saint-Riquier (Somme), completed in 788, was a major achievement in monastic architecture. Another important building (mostly lost today) was "Theodulf's Villa" in Germigny-des-Prés.

With the end of Carolingian rule around 900, artistic production halted for almost three generations. After the demise of the Carolingian Empire, France split into a number of feuding provinces, lacking any organized patronage. French art of the tenth and eleventh centuries was produced by local monasteries to promote literacy and piety, however, the primitive styles produced were not so highly skilled as the techniques of the earlier Carolingian period.

Multiple regional styles developed based on the chance availability of Carolingian manuscripts as models to copy, and the availability of itinerant artists. The monastery of Saint Bertin became an important center under its abbot Odbert (986–1007), who created a new style based on Anglo-Saxon and Carolingian forms. The nearby abbey of St. Vaast (Pas-de-Calais) also created a number of important works. In southwestern France a number of manuscripts were produced c. 1000, at the monastery of Saint Martial in Limoges, as well as at Albi, Figeac, and Saint-Sever-de-Rustan in Gascony. In Paris a unique style developed at the abbey of Saint-Germain-des-Prés. In Normandy a new style arose in 975. By the later tenth century with the Cluny reform movement and a revived spirit for the concept of Empire, art production resumed.

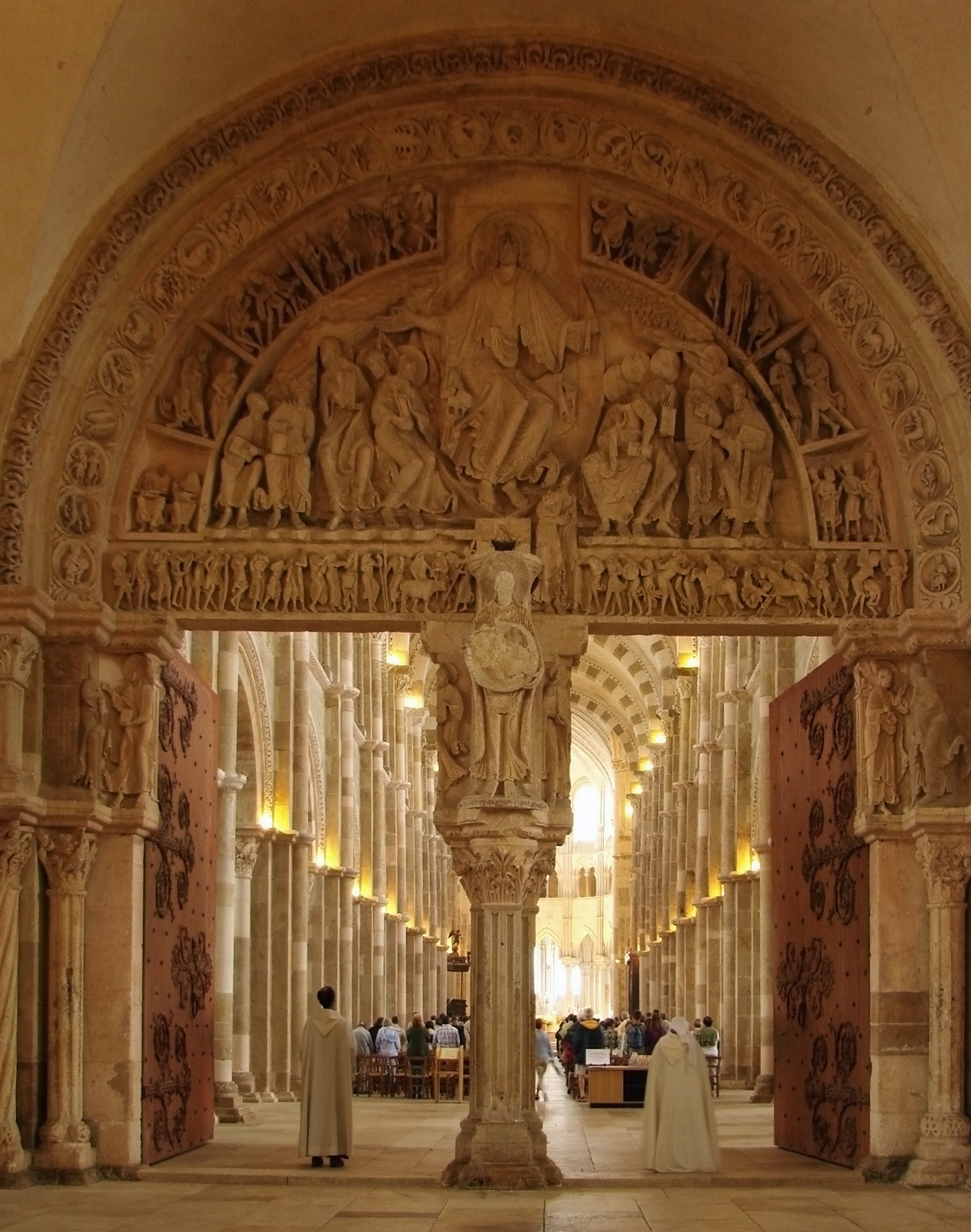
Central tympanum of the narthex of the Vézelay Abbey in Vézelay, 1140–1150

==== Romanesque art ====
Romanesque art refers to the art of Western Europe during a period of one hundred and fifty years, from approximately 1000 AD to the rise of the Gothic style, which arose in the middle of the twelfth century in France. "Romanesque Art" was marked by a renewed interest in Roman construction techniques. For example, the twelfth-century capitals on the cloister of Saint-Guilhem-le-Désert, adopt an acanthus-leaf motif and the decorative use of drill holes, which were commonly found on Roman monuments. Other important Romanesque buildings in France include the abbey of Saint-Benoît-sur-Loire in Loiret, the churches of Saint-Foy in Conques of Aveyron, Saint-Martin in Tours, Saint-Philibert in Tournus of Saône-et-Loire, Saint-Remi in Reims, and Saint-Sernin in Toulouse. In particular, Normandy experienced a large building campaign in the churches of Bernay, Mont-Saint-Michel, Coutances Cathedral, and Bayeux.

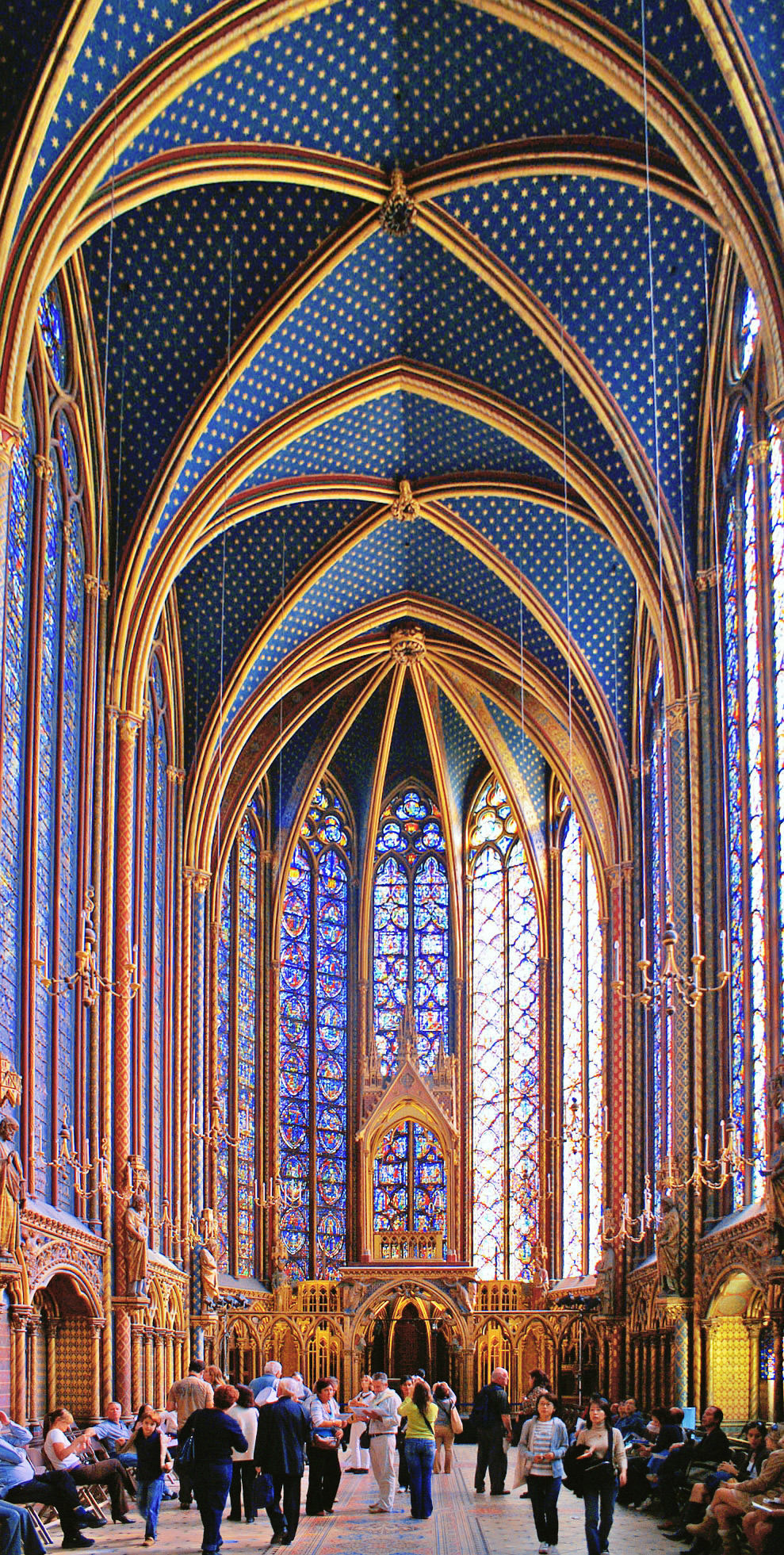
Interior of the Chapelle Haute, Sainte Chapelle, Paris

Most Romanesque sculpture was integrated into church architecture, not only for aesthetic, but also for structural purposes. Small-scale sculpture during the pre-Romanesque period was influenced by Byzantine and Early Christian sculpture. Other elements were adopted from various local styles of Middle Eastern countries. Motifs were derived from the arts of the "barbarian," such as grotesque figures, beasts, and geometric patterns, which were all important additions, particularly in the regions north of the Alps. Among the important sculptural works of the period are the ivory carvings at the monastery of Saint Gall. Monumental sculpture was rarely practised separately from architecture in the Pre-Romanesque period. For the first time after the fall of the Roman empire, monumental sculpture emerged as a significant art form. Covered church façades, doorways, and capitals all increased and expanded in size and importance, as in the Last Judgment Tympanum, Beaulieu-sur-Dordogne, and the Standing Prophet at Moissac. Monumental doors, baptismal fonts, and candle holders, frequently decorated with scenes from biblical history, were cast in bronze, attesting to the skills of the contemporary metalworkers. Frescoes were applied to the vaults and walls of churches. Rich textiles and precious objects in gold and silver, such as chalices and reliquaries, were produced in increasing numbers to meet the needs of the liturgy, and to serve the cult of the saints. In the twelfth century, large-scale stone sculpture spread throughout Europe. In the French Romanesque churches of Provence, Burgundy, and Aquitaine, sculptures adorned the façades and statues were incorporated into the capitals.

==== Gothic ====
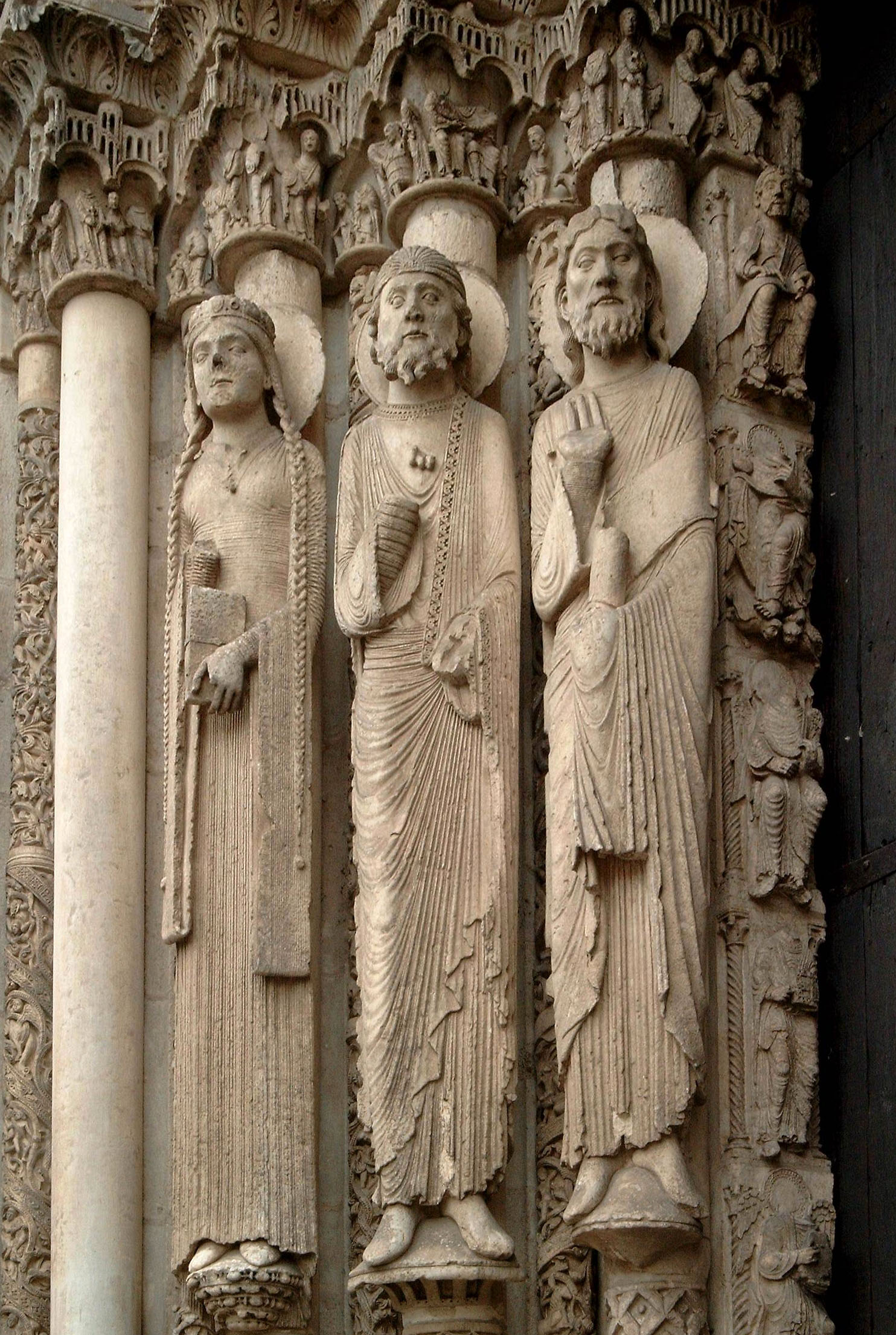
The Western (Royal) Portal at Chartres Cathedral, c. 1145, these architectural statues are the earliest Gothic sculptures, a revolution in style and the models for a generation of sculptors

Gothic art and architecture were products of a medieval art movement that lasted about three hundred years. It began in France, developing from the Romanesque period in the mid-twelfth century. By the late fourteenth century, it had evolved toward a more secular and natural style known as International Gothic, which continued until the late fifteenth century, when it evolved further, into Renaissance art. The primary Gothic art media were sculpture, panel painting, stained glass, fresco, and illuminated manuscript.

Gothic architecture was born in the middle of the twelfth century in Île-de-France, when Abbot Suger built the abbey at St. Denis, c. 1140, considered the first Gothic building, and soon afterward, the Chartres Cathedral, c. 1145. Prior to this, there had been no sculpture tradition in Île-de-France—so sculptors were brought in from Burgundy, who created the revolutionary figures acting as columns in the Western (Royal) Portal of Chartres Cathedral (see image) — it was an entirely new invention in French art, and would provide the model for a generation of sculptors. Other notable Gothic churches in France include Bourges Cathedral, Notre-Dame de Laon, Notre-Dame in Paris, Reims Cathedral, Amiens Cathedral and the Sainte-Chapelle in Paris.

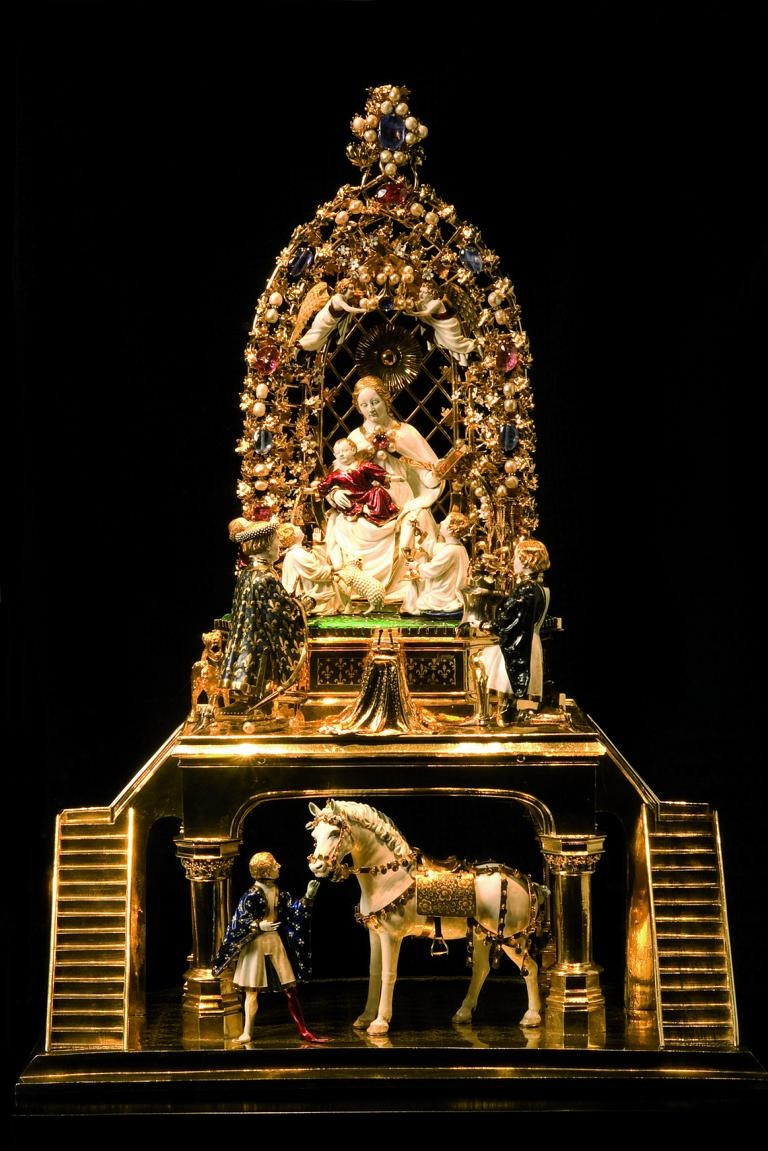
The Goldenes Röss, c. 1402, made in Paris for king Charles VI

The designations of styles in French Gothic architecture are as follows: Early Gothic, High Gothic, Rayonnant, and Late Gothic or Flamboyant. Division into these divisions is effective, but debatable. Because Gothic cathedrals were built over several successive periods, and the artisans of each period not necessarily following the wishes of previous periods, the dominant architectural style often changed during the building of a particular building. Consequently, it is difficult to declare one building as belonging to a certain era of Gothic architecture. It is more useful to use the terms as descriptors for specific elements within a structure, rather than applying it to the building as a whole : the Western portal of Chartres cathedral is an example of Early gothic while the West and North transept portals, dating back to the early 13th-century, are typical of High Gothic.

The French ideas spread. Gothic sculpture evolved from the early stiff and elongated style, still partly Romanesque, into a spatial and naturalistic treatment in the late twelfth and early thirteenth century. French architects and sculptors were active abroad, in England, Spain and the Holy Roman Empire: the gothic sculptures of the Door of the Sarmental in Burgos cathedral in Spain were made by French artists while the anonymous German sculptor from the 13th-century known as the Naumburg Master is presumed to be of French origin. Influences from surviving ancient Greek and Roman sculptures were incorporated into the treatment of drapery, facial expression, and pose of the Dutch-Burgundian sculptor, Claus Sluter, and the taste for naturalism first signaled the end of Gothic sculpture, evolving into the classicistic Renaissance style by the end of the fifteenth century.

Paris, at the time, the largest city in the Western world, became a leading center for the production of luxurious artifacts in the 13th and 14th century, especially little ivory sculptures and ivory caskets with scenes of courtly love (such as Casket with Scenes of Romances in the Walters Art Museum). Paris also developed into one of the most exuberant centers for the production of jewellery and precious reliquaries, such as the Holy Thorn Reliquary made for Jean, duke of Berry or the Goldenes Rössl of Altötting, made for Charles VI, king of France.

French Gothic art

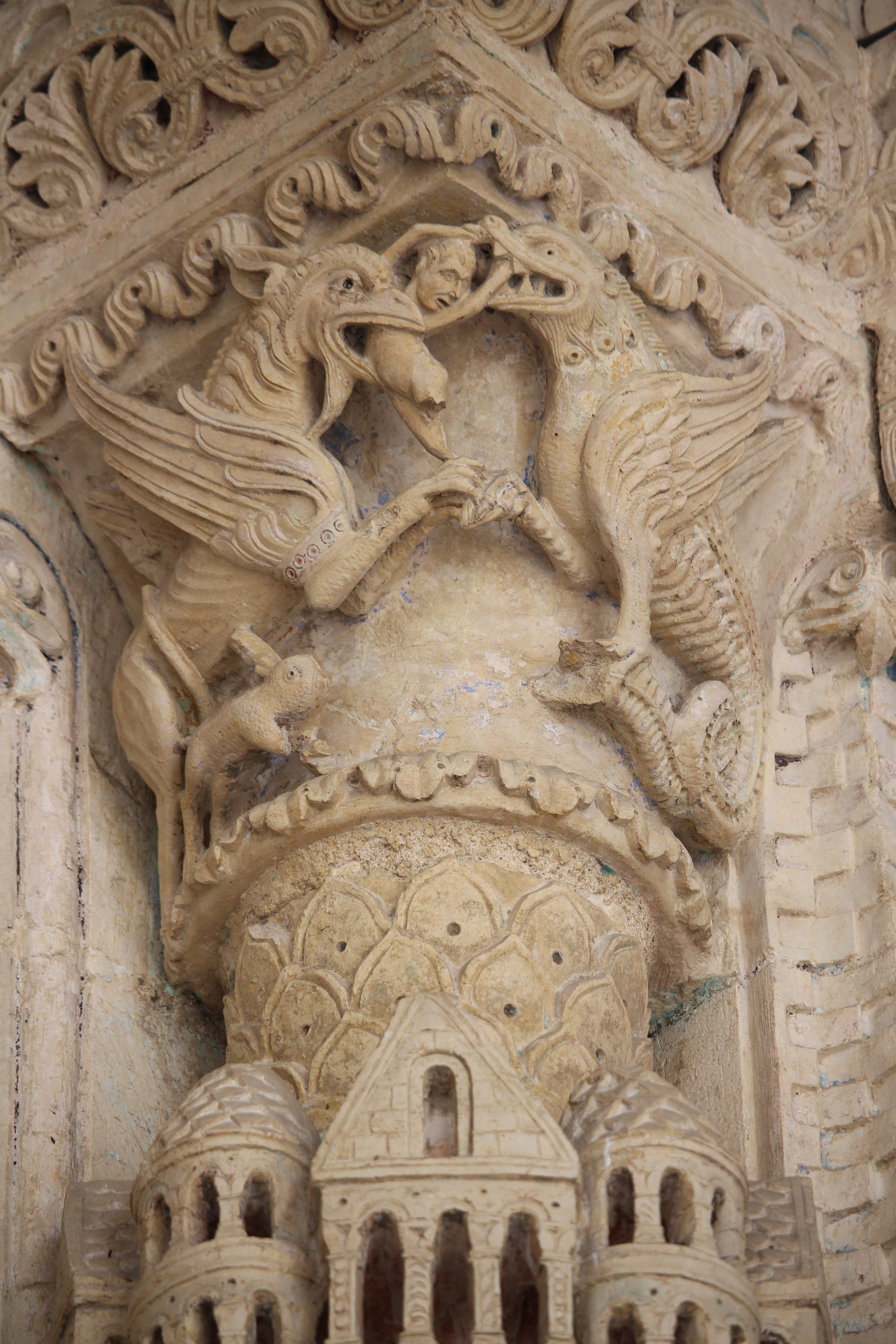
A capital of the south portal of Bourges Cathedral, circa 1160–1170

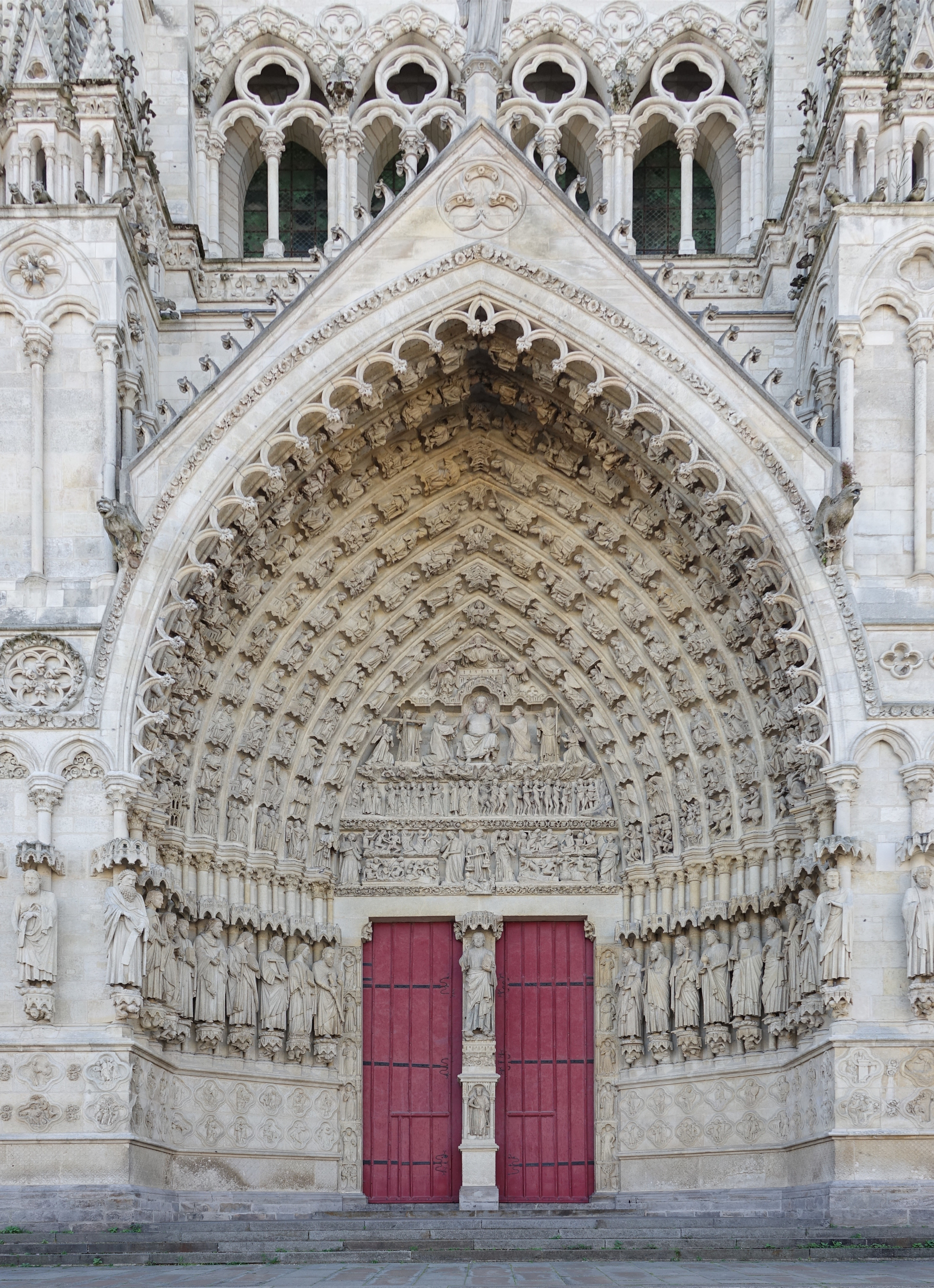
Last Judgment portal of the West facade of Amiens Cathedral, 1220–1230

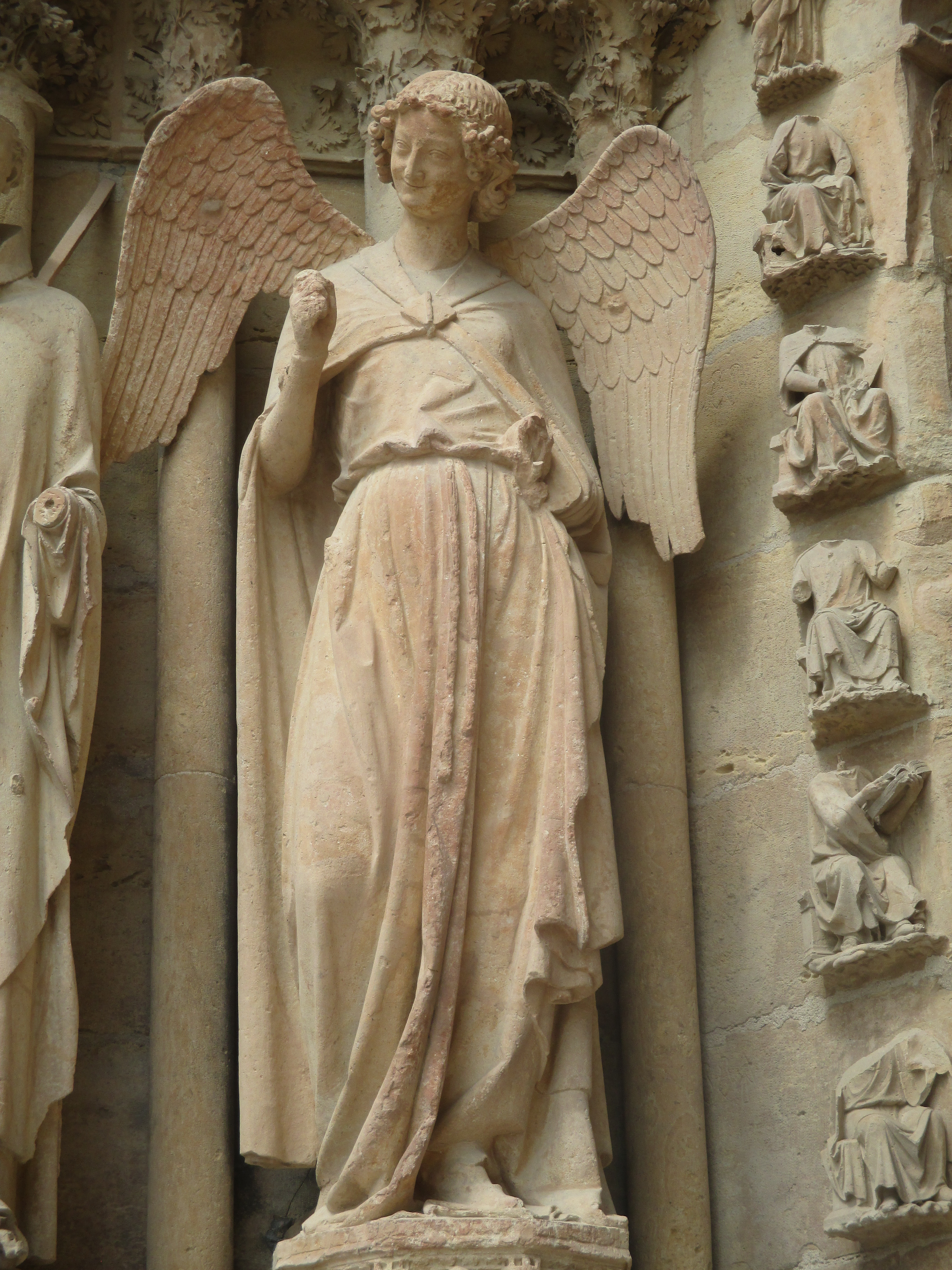
Smiling Angel of Reims Cathedral, 1236–1245

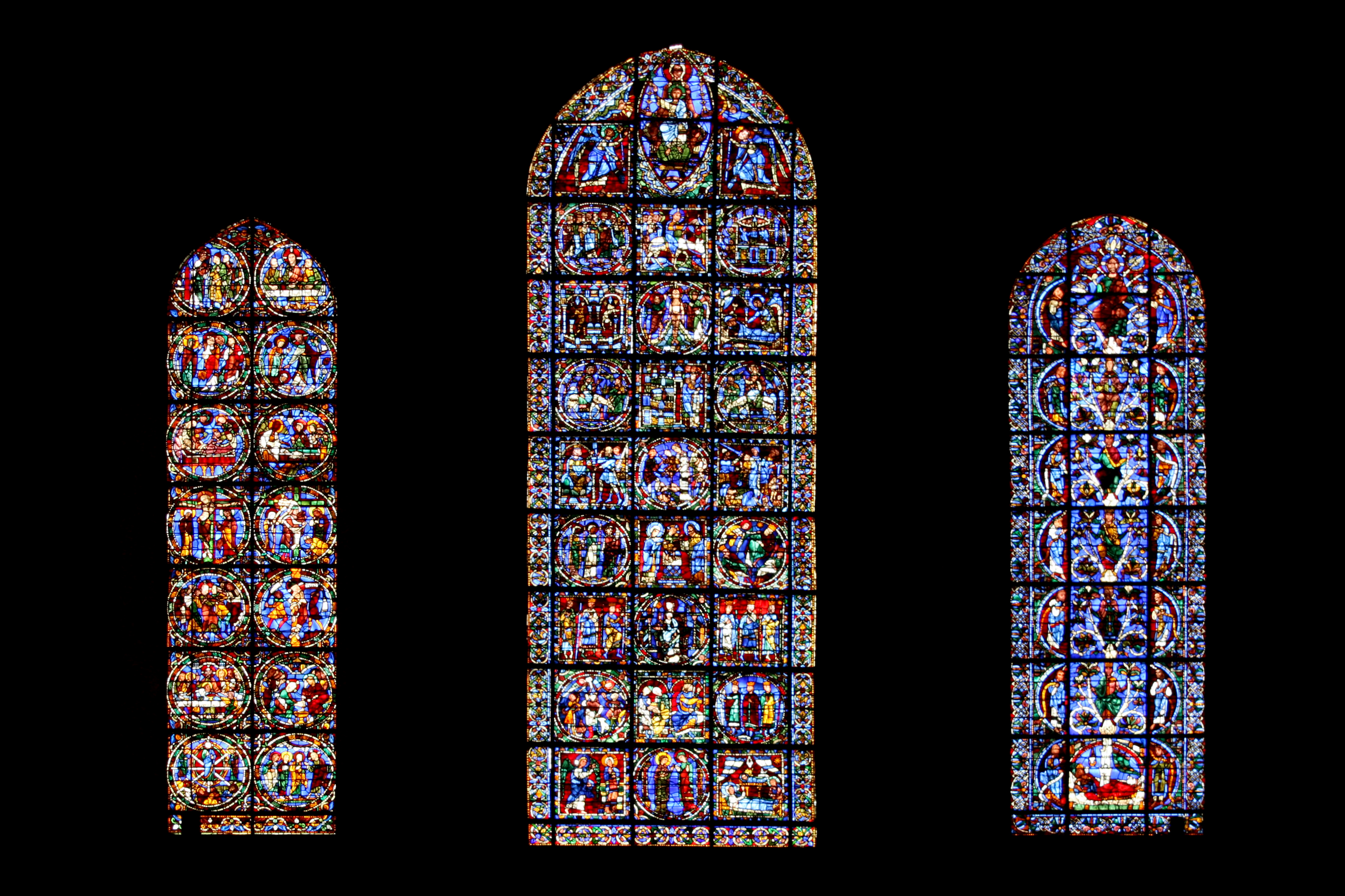
Stained glass of the western rose lancets of Chartres Cathedral, middle of the 12th century

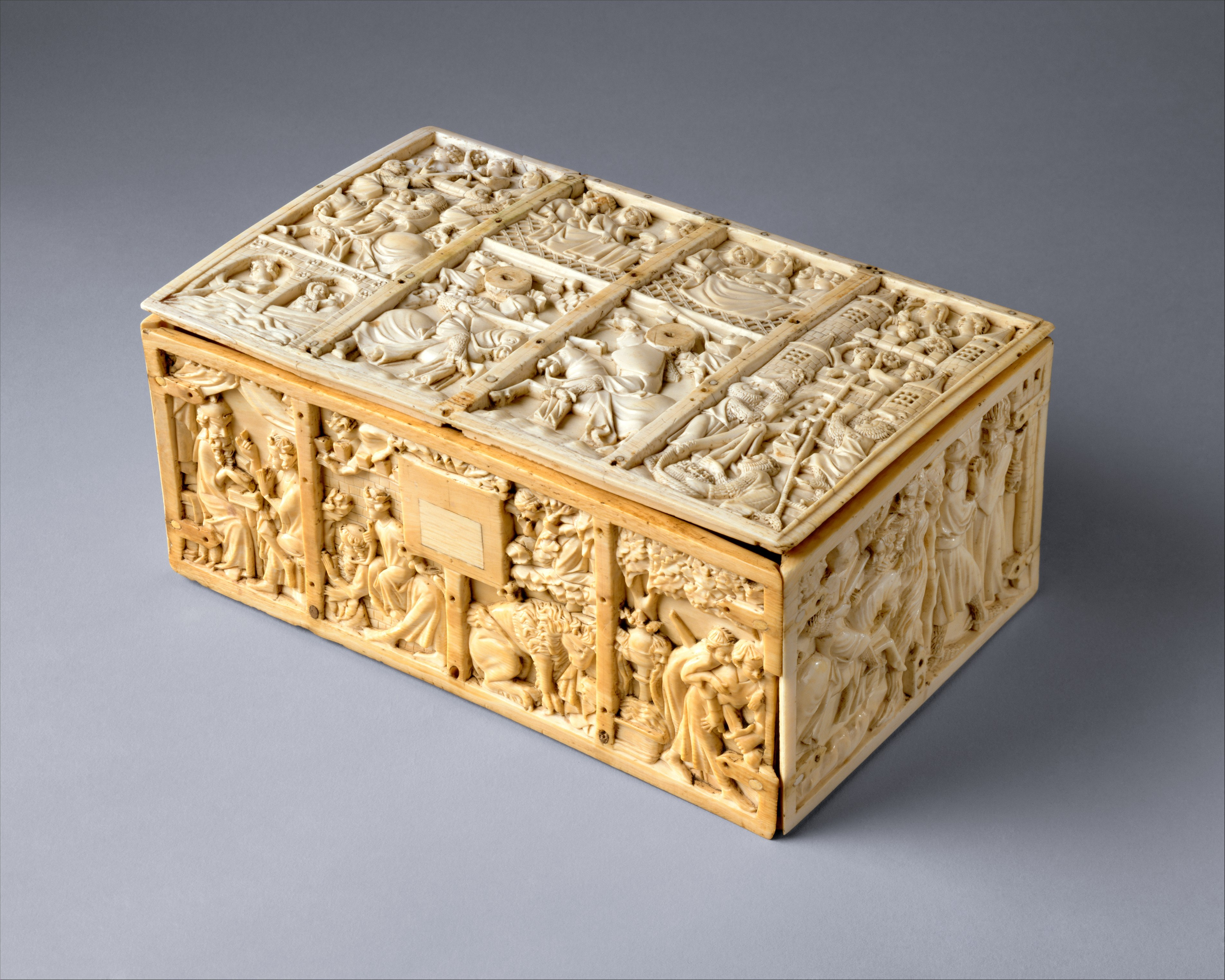
Casket with Scenes from Romances, circa 1310–1330

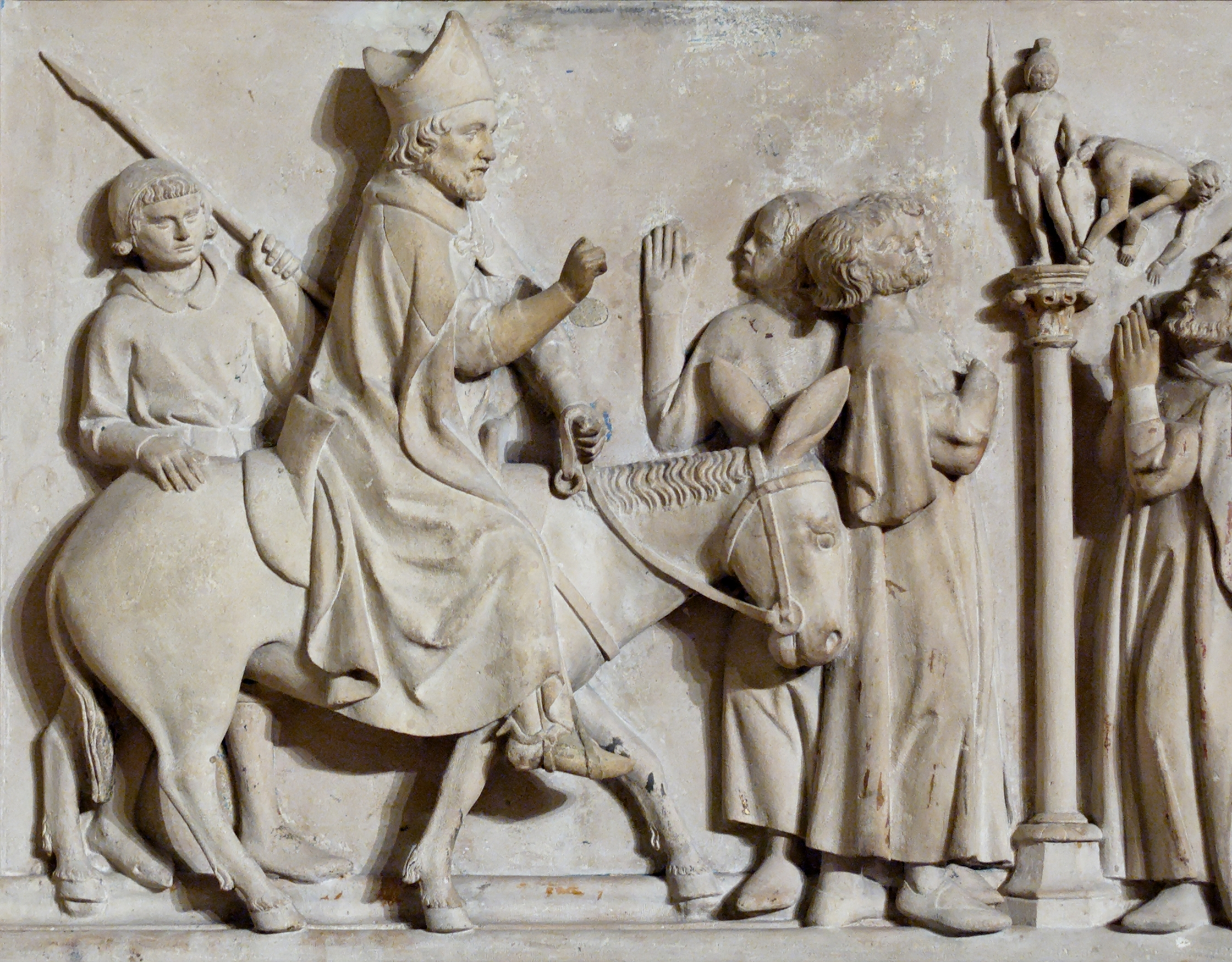
Scenes from the Life of Saint Benedict, 1250-1260 stone relief

Painting in a style that may be called "Gothic" did not appear until about 1200, nearly fifty years after the start of Gothic architecture and sculpture. The transition from Romanesque to Gothic is very imprecise and by no means clearly delineated, but one may see the beginning of a style that is more somber, dark, and emotional than the previous period. This transition occurs first in England and France around 1200, in Germany around 1220, and in Italy around 1300. Painting, the representation of images on a surface, was practiced during the Gothic period in four primary crafts, frescos, panel paintings, manuscript illumination, and stained glass. Frescoes continued to be used as the main pictorial narrative craft on church walls in southern Europe as a continuation of early Christian and Romanesque traditions. In the north, stained glass and manuscript illumination remained the dominant art form until the fifteenth century.

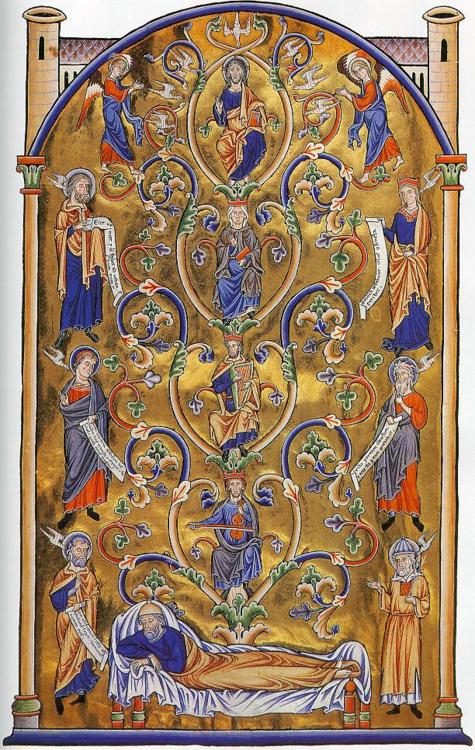
A page from the Ingeborg Psalter, Northern France, c. 1195.

At the end of the 14th century and during the 15th century French princely courts such as those of the dukes of Burgundy, the duke of Anjou or the duke of Berry as well as the pope and the cardinals in Avignon employed renowned painters, such as the Netherlandish Limbourg Brothers, Barthélemy d'Eyck and Jean Hey and the French painters Enguerrand Quarton, Jean Fouquet or Nicolas Froment who developed the so-called International Gothic style that spread through Europe and incorporated the new Flemish influence and, later, the innovations of the Italian early Renaissance artists. Sculptors from Flanders and the Netherlands - then mostly part of the Burgundian Netherlands as they were ruled by the Dukes of Burgundy, a cadet branch of the Valois - also worked extensivly for the dukes Philip the Bold and John the Fearless, like Claus Sluter, who created the well of Moses in Dijon, and Claus de Werve. They renovated gothic sculpture with a new sense of expression and a more natutalistic style and were later joined by the Spanish Jean de la Huerta and the French Antoine Le Moiturier. Northern France was also the main European center for illuminated manuscripts production. Illuminated manuscripts represent the most complete record of Gothic painting, providing a record of styles in places where no monumental works have otherwise survived.

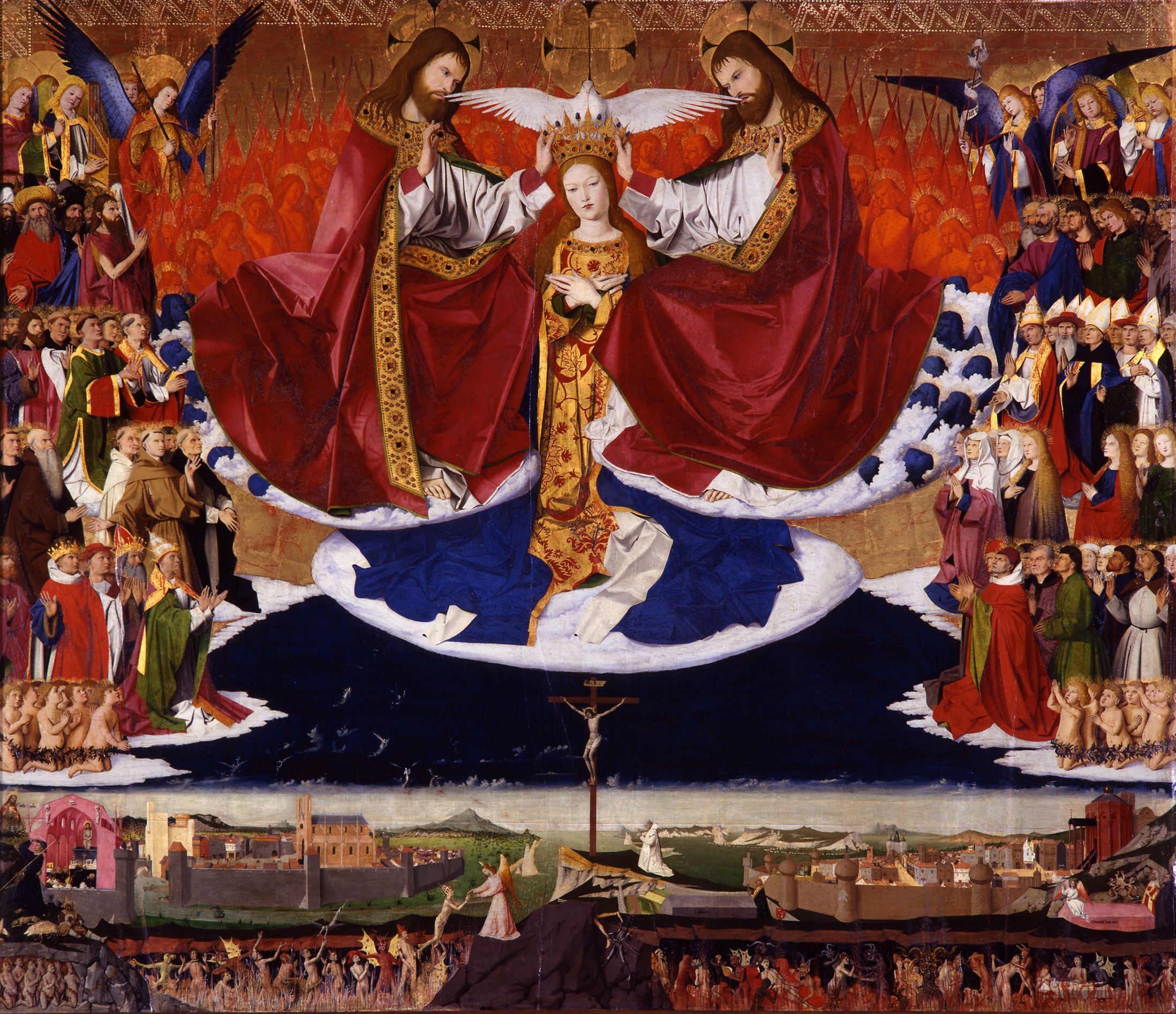
Enguerrand Quarton, The Coronation of the Virgin, 1452–53

The earliest full manuscripts with French Gothic illustrations date to the middle of the 13th century. Many such illuminated manuscripts were royal bibles, although psalters also included illustrations; the Parisian Psalter of Saint Louis, dating from 1253 to 1270, features 78 full-page illuminations in tempera paint and gold leaf.

Illuminated manuscripts flourished especially in the 15th century, thanks to the many ducal courts that rose to power in France at the time. In the 15th century, these precious painted books were usually made by Flemish painters from the Burgundian Netherlands or French painters in the service of the main princely courts (the king's court in Paris, but also the ducal courts of Burgundy, Anjou, Berry, Bourbon, Orléans and Brittany). The king of Sicily and duke of Anjou, René was himself a writer of courtly love novels and asked the best artists to decorate his own writings with elaborate paintings, such as the Livre du cœur d'Amour épris illuminated by Barthélémy d'Eyck. The Limbourg brothers were responsible for the Très riches heures du duc de Berry, considered the masterpiece of International gothic manuscripts, made for the Duke of Berry, king Charles V's brother.

French Gothic art

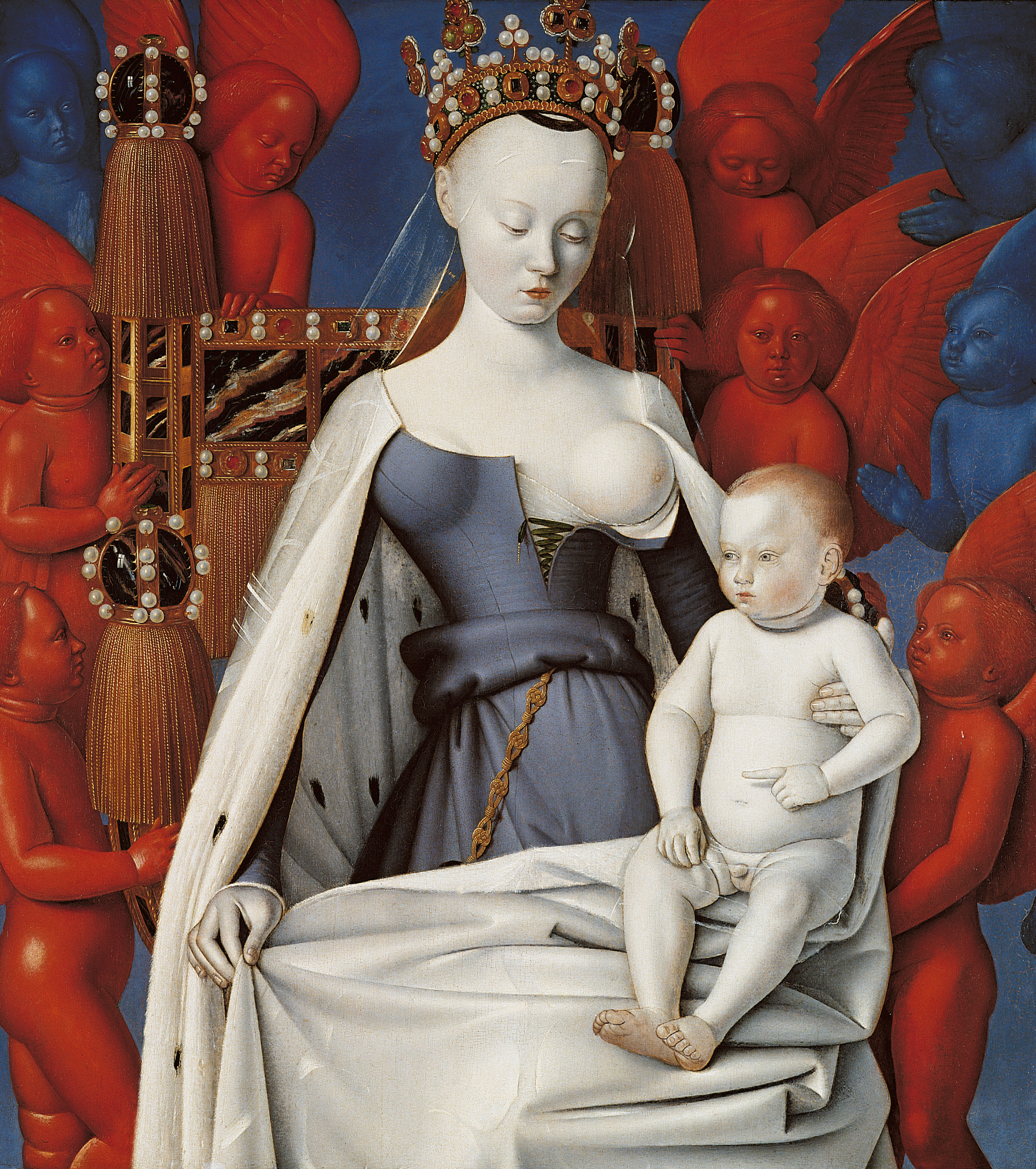
Jean Fouquet, Virgin and Child Surrounded by Angels, right wing of the Melun Diptych, circa 1452

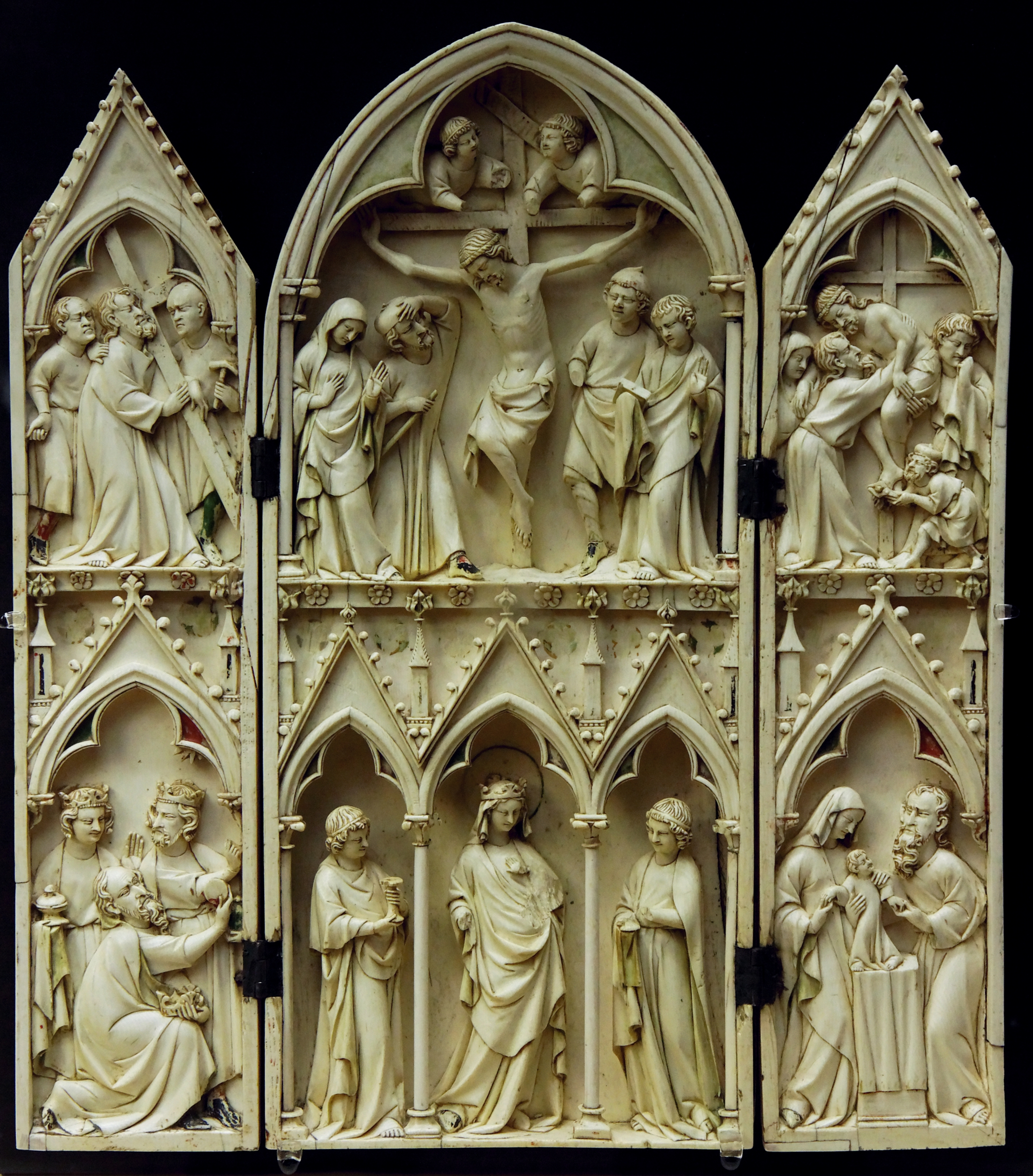
Ivory triptych, Scenes from the Childhood and the Passion of Christ, Paris, end of 13th-century

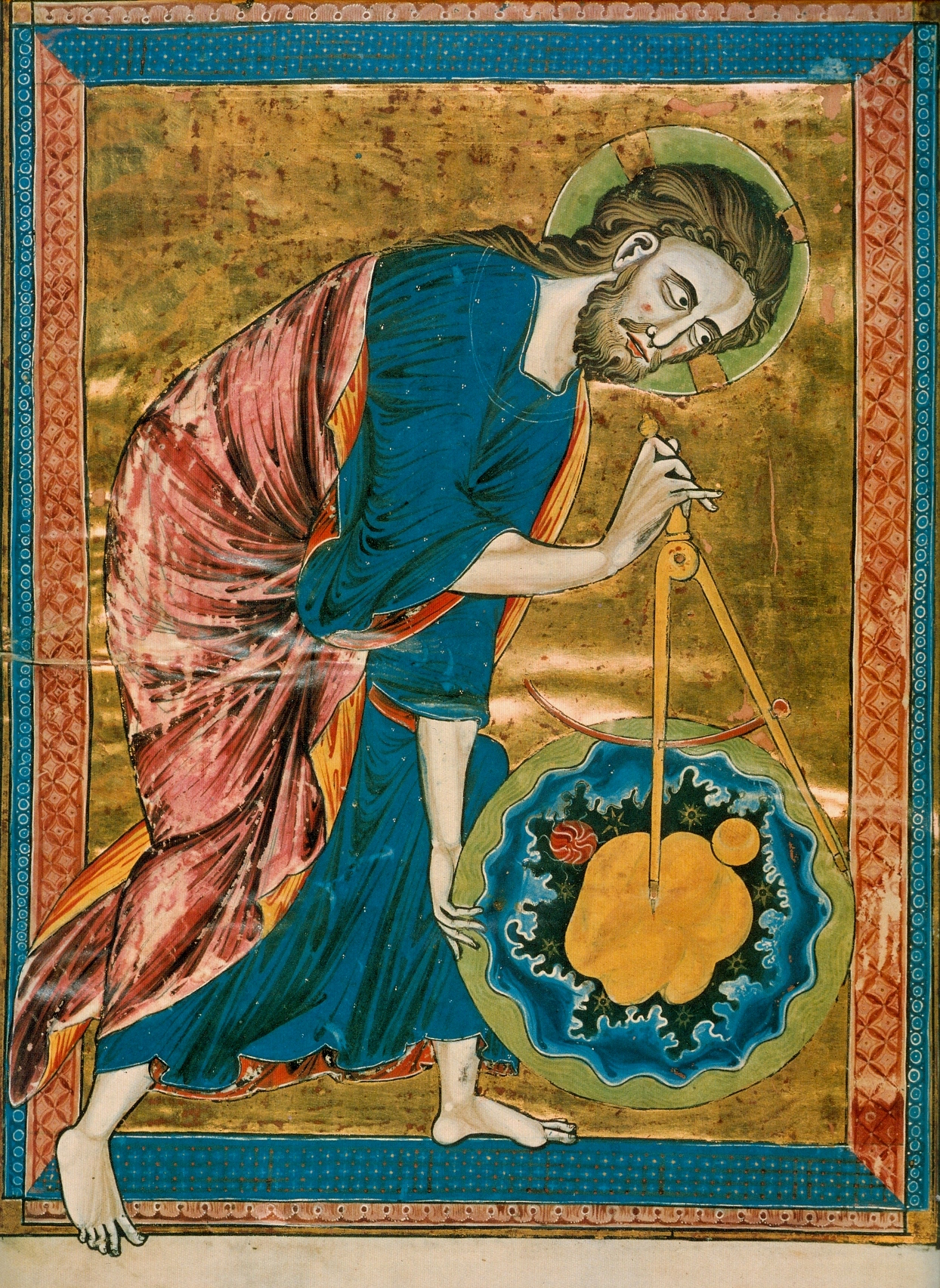
God the Geometer, illuminated manuscript, circa 1220–1230

Albi Cathedral Roodscreen, 1474–1483

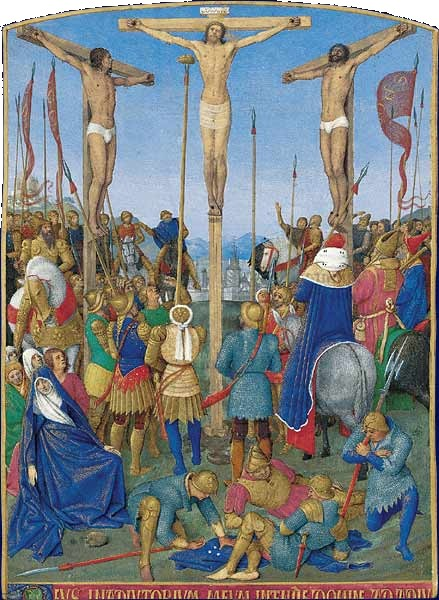
Jean Fouquet, Crucifixion, circa 1452–1460, from an illuminated manuscript

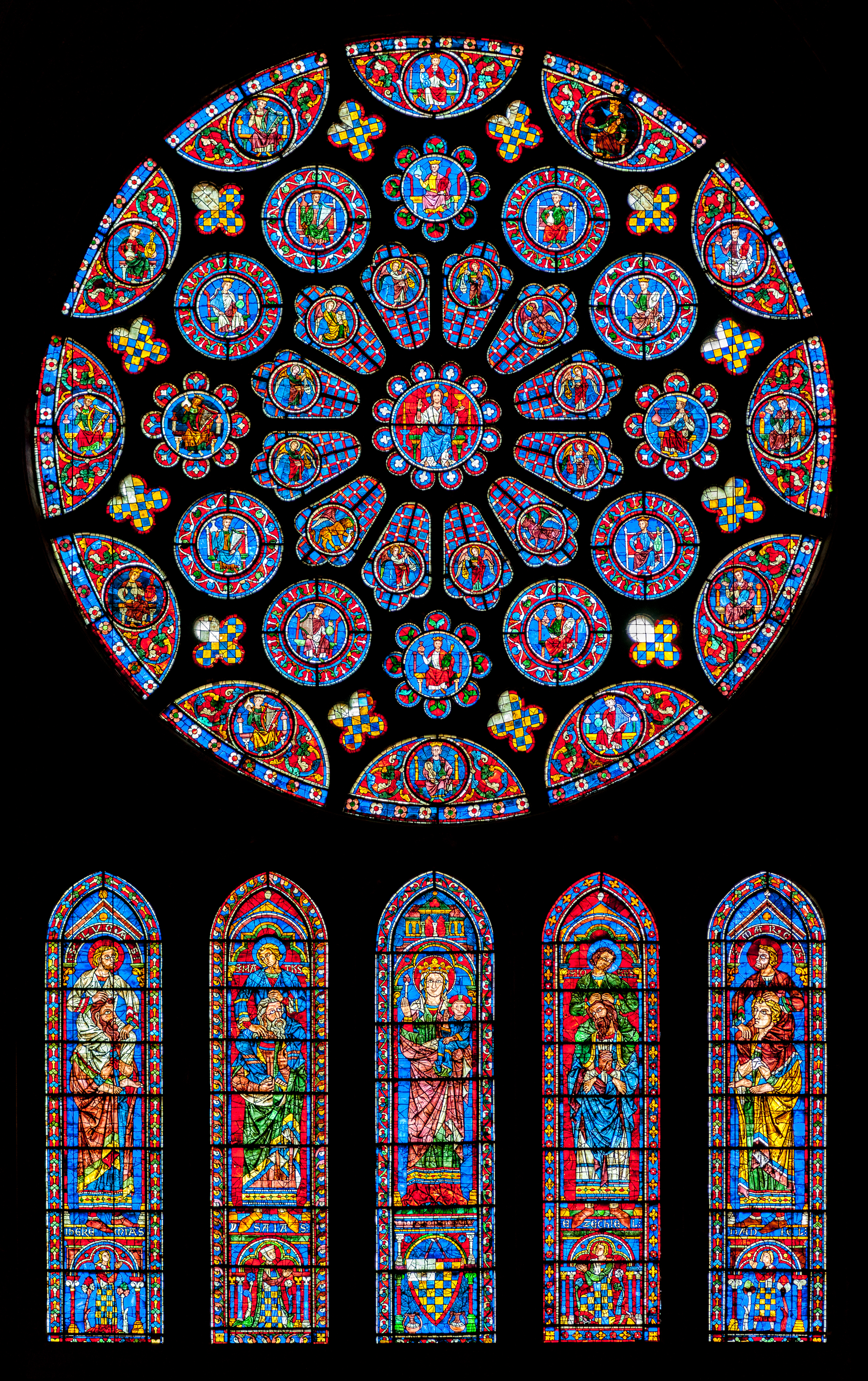
Chartres Cathedral stained glass, south rose window, 1221–1230

=== Early Modern period ===
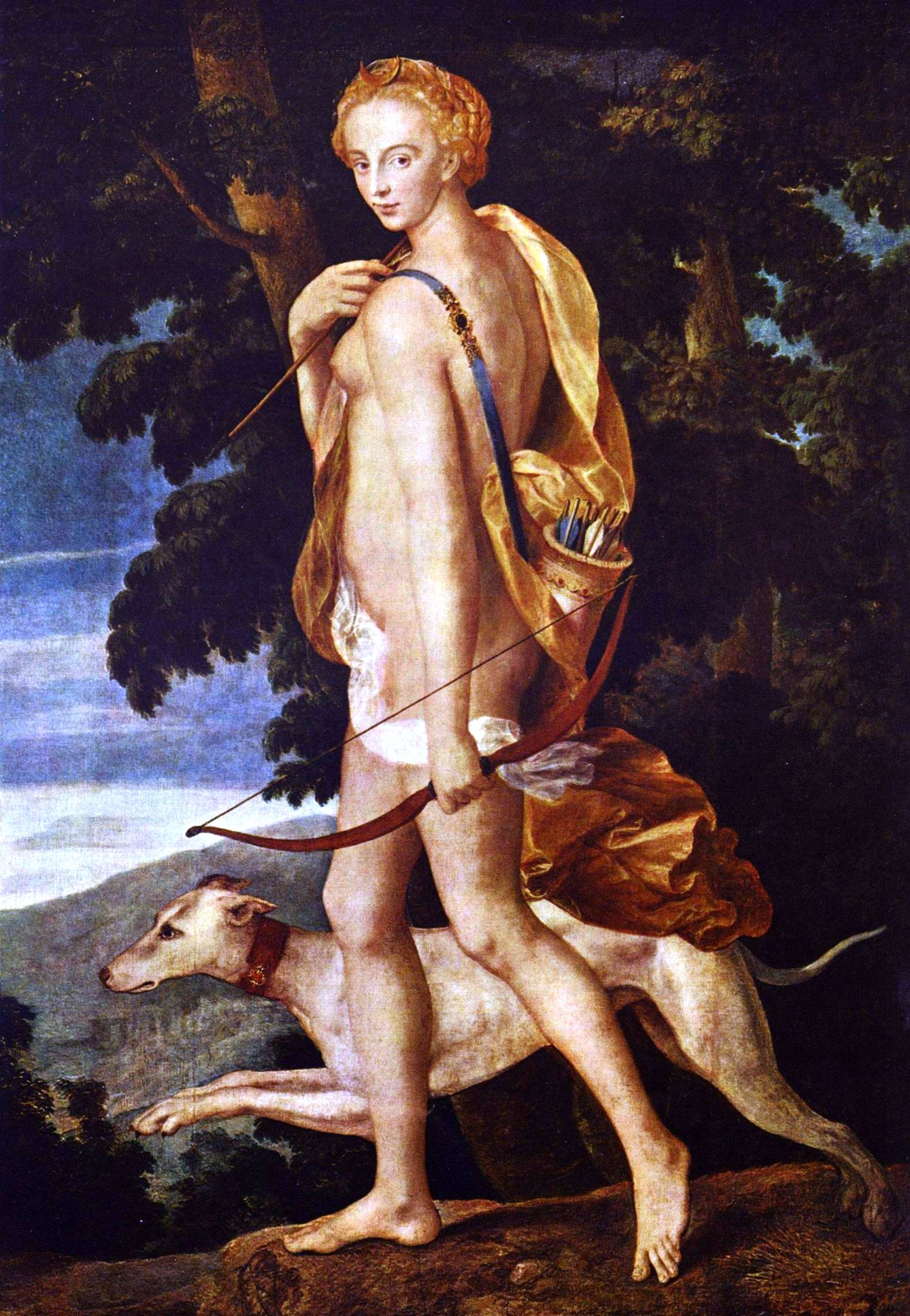
Diana the Huntress - School of Fontainebleau, 1550–1560

In the late fifteenth century, the French invasion of Italy and the proximity of the vibrant Burgundy court, with its Flemish connections, brought the French into contact with the goods, paintings, and the creative spirit of the Northern and Italian Renaissance. Initial artistic changes to painting at that time in France were executed by Flemish artists, such as Jean Clouet and his son François Clouet (who was born in France) or the portrait painter Corneille de Lyon, along with the Italians, Rosso Fiorentino, Francesco Primaticcio, and Niccolò dell'Abbate, the last three constituting what is often called the first School of Fontainebleau from 1531. In the Palace of Fontainebleau, one of Francis I favorite residences, they executed numerous works for the palace's decoration, like the 64-meters long great gallery adorned with frescos, stuccos and carved wood panellings. Leonardo da Vinci also was invited to France by Francis I, but other than the paintings which he brought with him, he produced little for the French king.

But far from disappearing, Gothic art remained very much in vogue in France during the first third of the 16th century, particularly in architecture. In many cases, architects and sculptors combined Gothic structure (pointed arches, large stained-glass windows, ribbed vaults) and Renaissance decoration inspired by antiquity in a richly ornamented style that can be considered a continuation of Flamboyant Gothic. A good example is the church of Saint-Eustache in Paris.

The art of the period from the 1530s through the reign of Henry IV is often heavily inspired by late Italian pictorial and sculptural developments commonly referred to as Mannerism, which is associated with the later works of Michelangelo and Parmigianino, among others. It is characterized by figures which are elongated and graceful and rely upon visual rhetoric, including the elaborate use of allegory and mythology. Perhaps the greatest accomplishment of the French Renaissance was the construction of the Châteaux of the Loire Valley, like Azay-le-Rideau, Chambord and Chenonceau. No longer conceived of as fortresses, such pleasure palaces took advantage of the richness of the rivers and lands of the Loire region and show remarkable architectural skill - like the Chenonceau castle, which is built on a bridge across the river Cher.

Some important French architects who adopted the Renaissance style are Pierre Lescot, who rebuilt a part of the Louvre palace for the king, Philibert Delorme, who built the Château d'Anet for Diane de Poitiers, Jean Bullant, who rebuilt the Château d'Écouen nea Paris for Anne de Montmorency, and Jacques I Androuet du Cerceau, remembered especially for his suites of engravings of French châteaux and the perspective views of their gardens which he published in Les plus excellents bastiments de France (1576, second volume 1579).

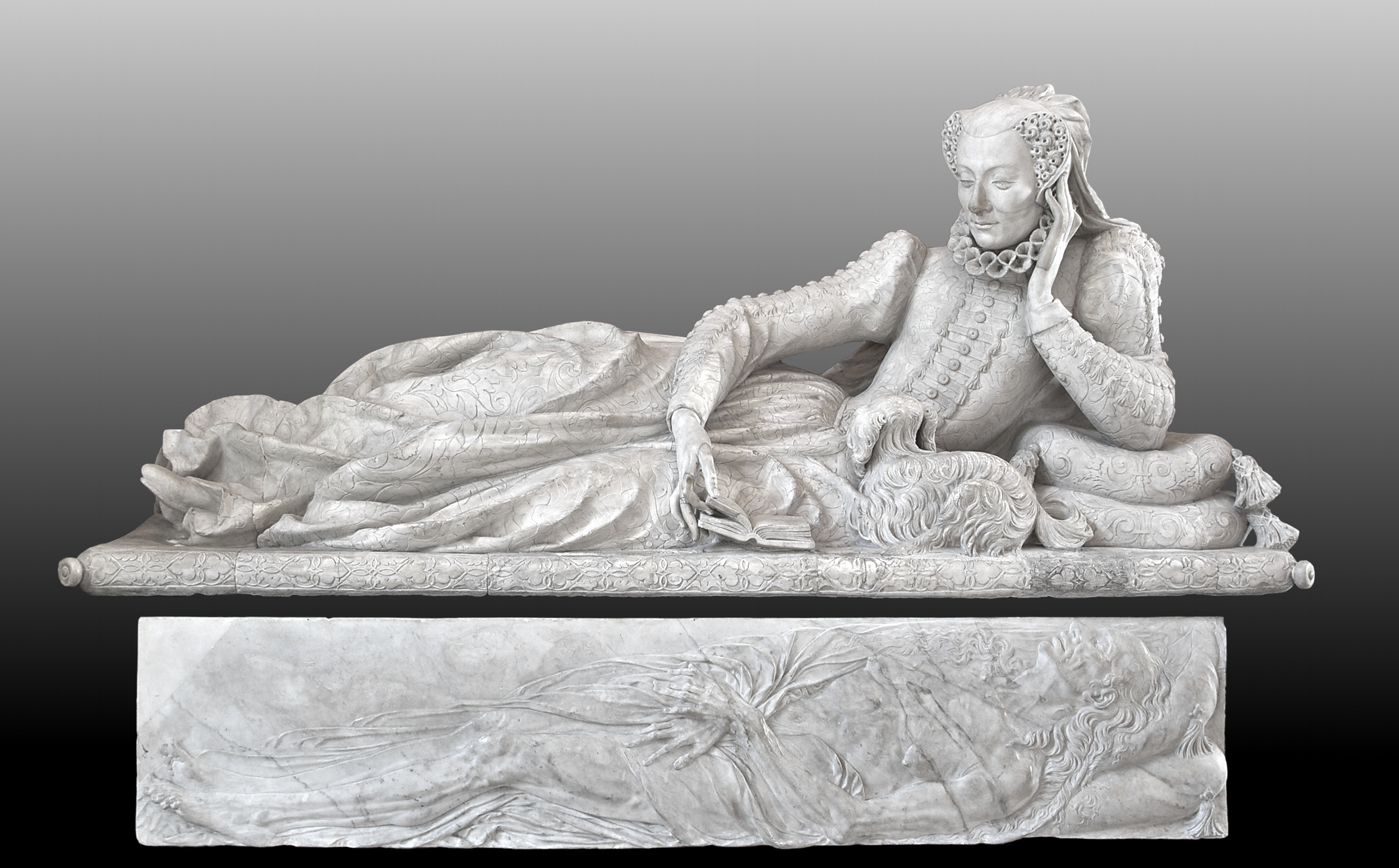
Germain Pilon, Tomb of Valentina Balbiani, 1573

Sculpture knew a great development in France during the Renaissance and has been better preserved than painting. Though Francesco Laurana worked in France for a short period of time in the late 15th century, it was only in the beginning of the 16th century that the Italian style became prevalent in France, after the Italian Wars started. In sculpture, the arrival of the Giusto family, who followed Louis XII in France in 1504 was instrumental. Later, another major Italian sculptor who was employed at the court was Benvenuto Cellini, who worked for François Ier from 1540, and imported the Mannerist style to France (one example being his Nymph of Fontainebleau). Major French sculptors of the time are Michel Colombe, responsible for the Tomb of Francis II, Duke of Brittany in Nantes, who had the opportunity to work alongside the Giusto brothers. Along with Colombe, Jean Goujon and Germain Pilon are considered the best French sculptors of the period, working in an elaborate Mannerist style. Goujon executed pure and graceful feminine figures for the Louvre's new decoration. They are elongated, sensual and fluid while their drapery reveals his knowledge of Greek sculpture, though certainly not at first hand. Pilon's work - mainly funerary monuments - is imbued with realism and theatrical emotions and marked by the influence of Michelangelo. Another important figure of the time is Pierre Bontemps. The Champagne region around Troyes but also the Loire valley and Normandy were important regional centres for sculpture. In the Duchy of Lorraine and Bar, a regional but very talented figure appeared in the person of Ligier Richier.

In the Renaissance, Limoges became the leading the leading centre for enamel production, with several dynastic workshops, who often signed or punchmarked their work, like the one of Léonard Limosin and his descendants. Luxury pieces such as plates, plaques and ewers were painted with sophisticated Mannerist decoration of pictorial figure scenes, which were surrounded by elaborate borders. From the 1520s to around the 1550s, Saint-Porchaire ware was made in the Poitou region of Western France: very few example of it have survived. It is characterized by the use of inlays of clay in a different coloured clay. The main body is white, though covered by a thin cream glaze. There is intensive use of patterns inlaid in brown, reddish-brown or yellow-ochre slips. It might be called the first high-quality European ceramic style to show an interest in sculptural forms, rather than the decoration in paint of flattish dish surfaces typical in Hispano-Moresque ware and Italian Renaissance maiolica.

In the second half of the 16th-century, Bernard Palissy, a Protestant humanist who worked for the queen and the king, invented a very original style of ceramic: he is best known for his so-called "rusticware", typically highly decorated large oval platters featuring small animals in relief among vegetation, the animals apparently often being moulded from casts taken of dead specimens. In the 19th-century a revival of this style was named Palissy ware after him.

French Renaissance art

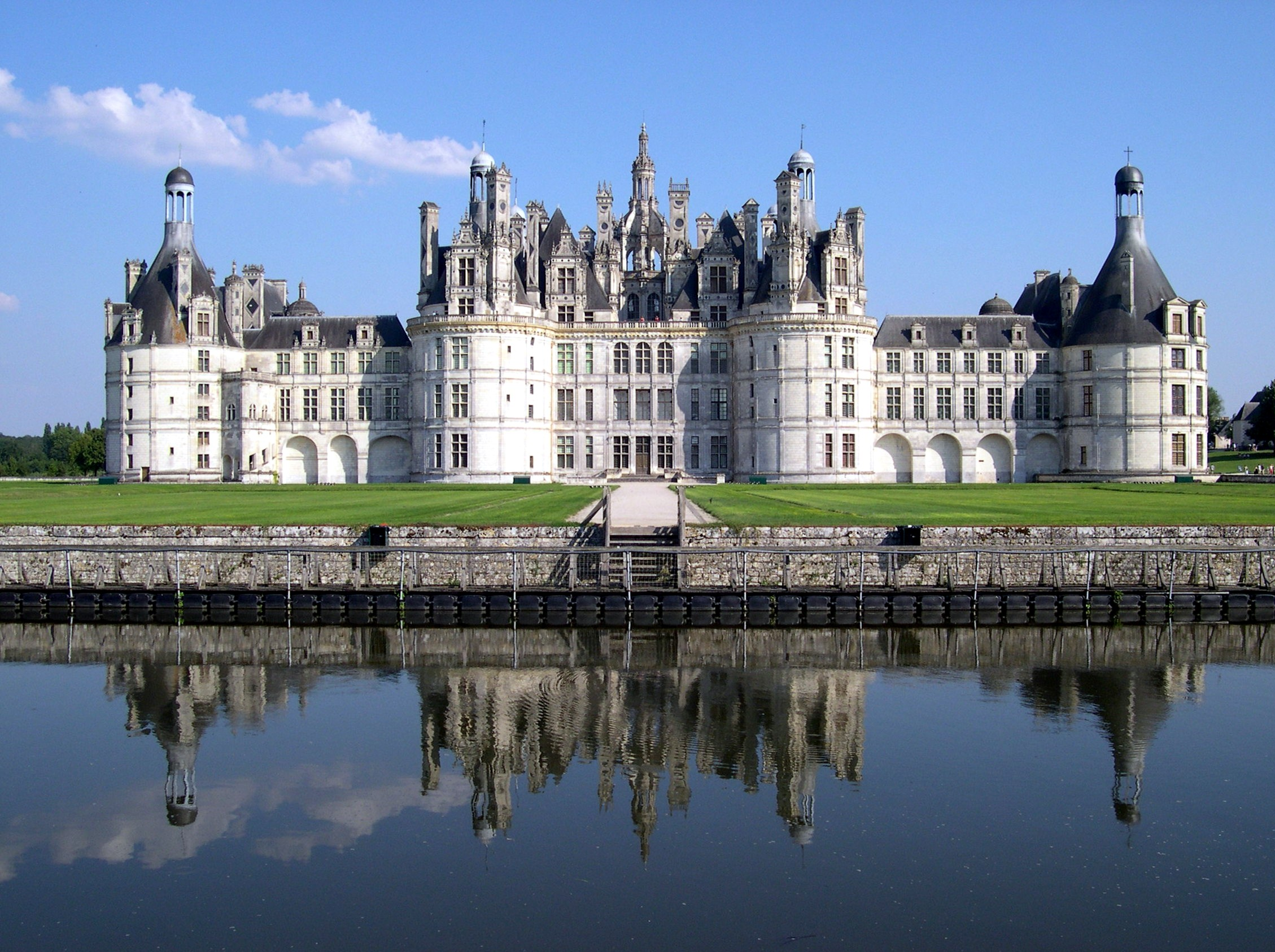
Château de Chambord

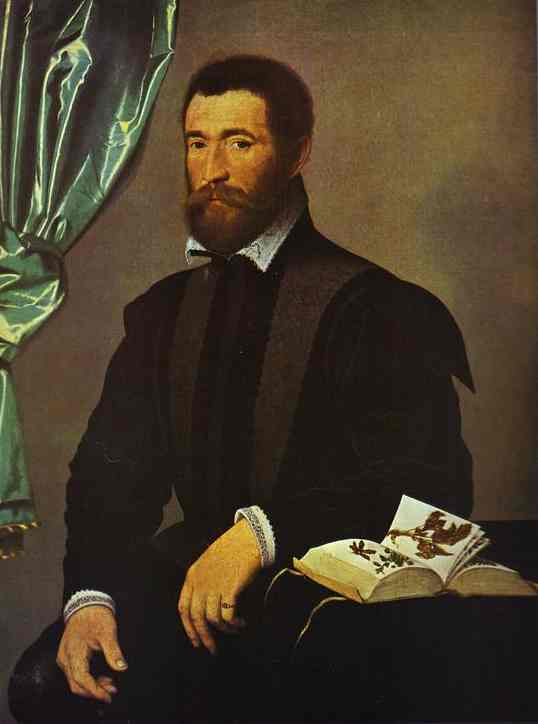
François Clouet, Portrait of Pierre Quthe, 1562

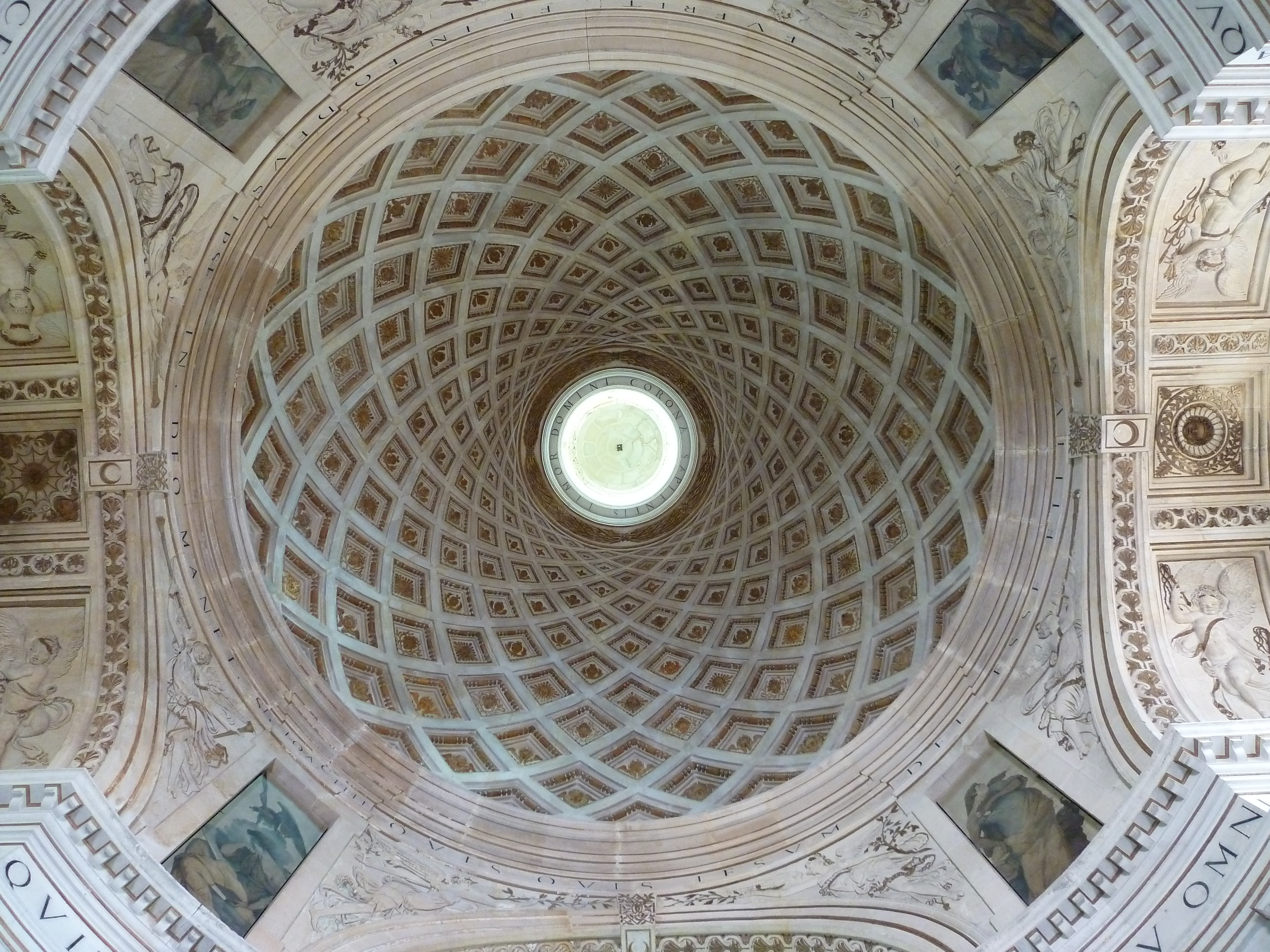
Ceiling of the chapel of the Château d'Anet

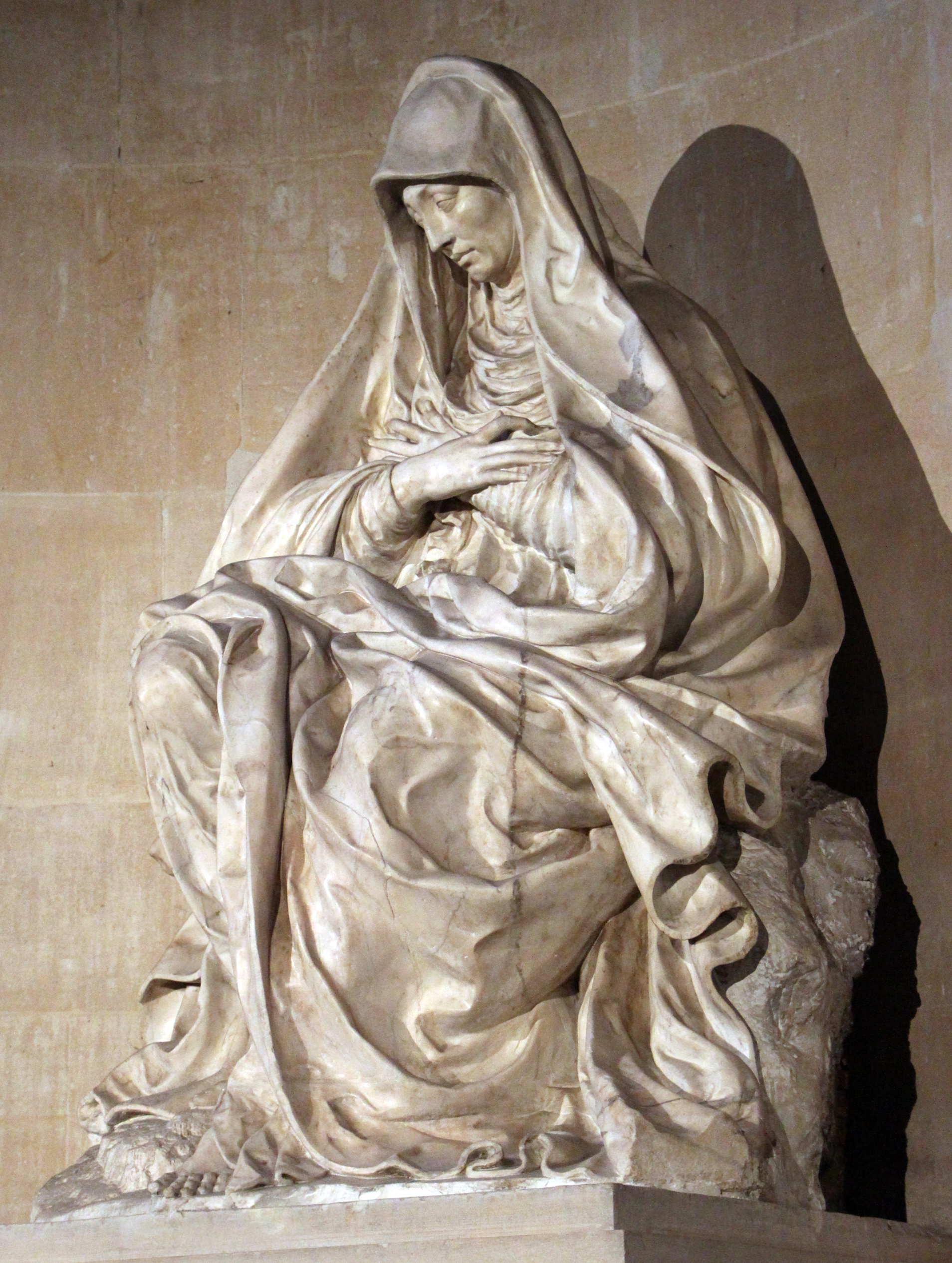
Germain Pilon, Virgin of Sorrows, 1586

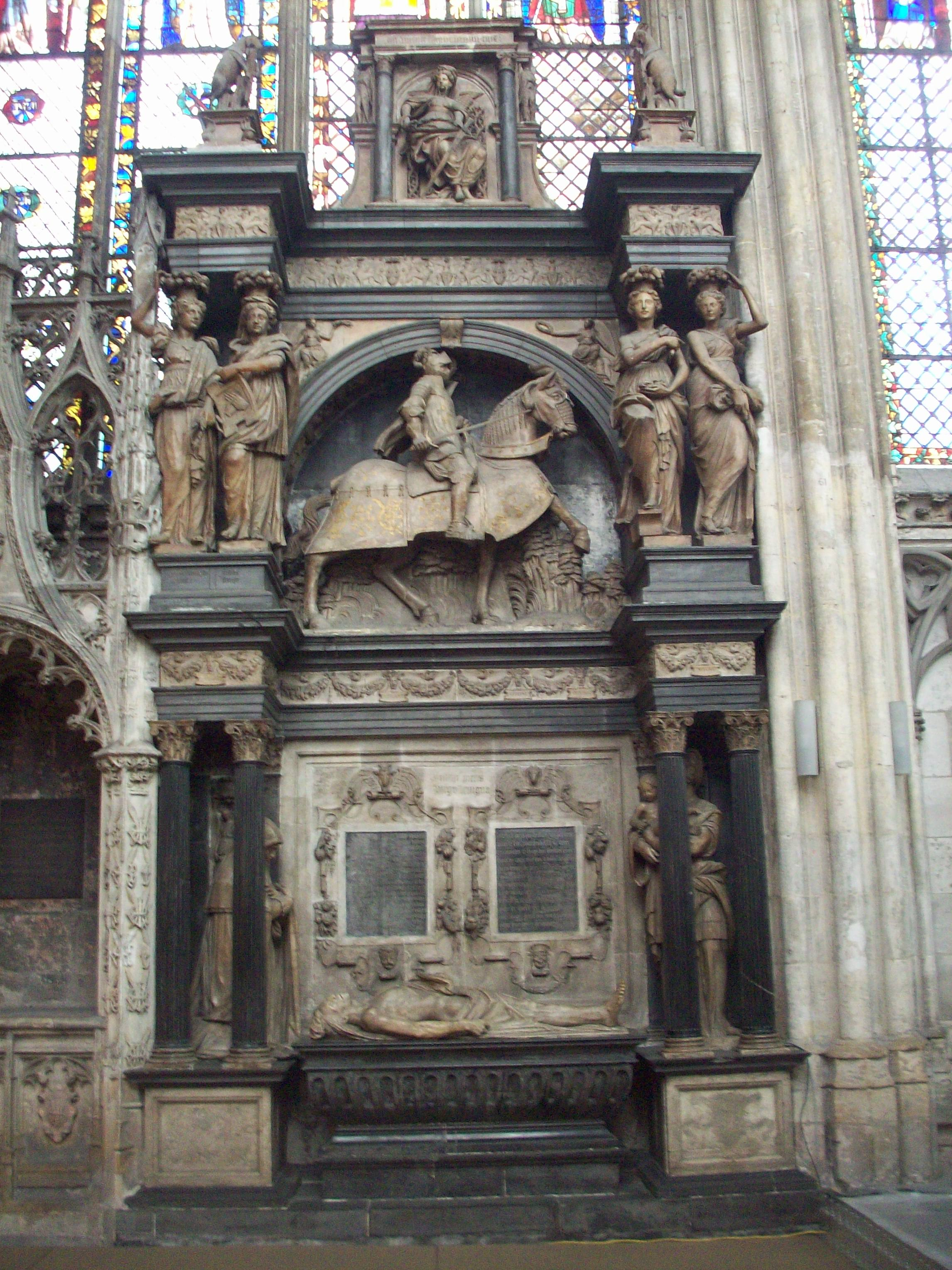
Jean Goujon and others, Funerary monument of Louis de Brezé in Rouen Cathedral, 1536–1544

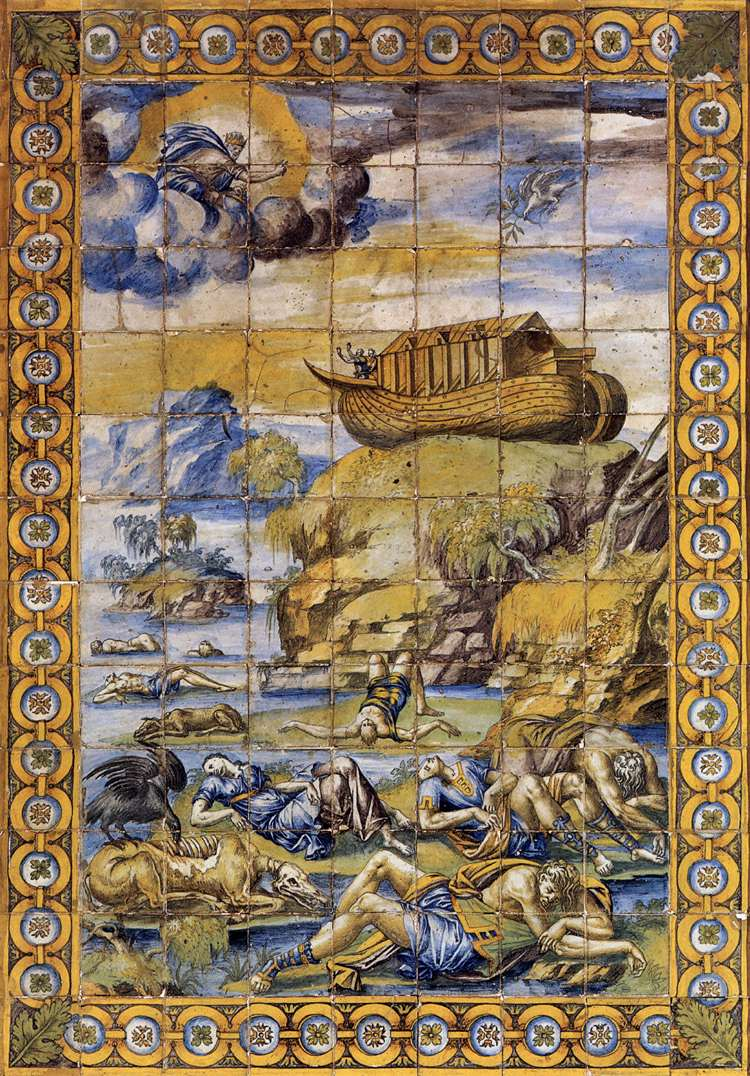
Masseot Abaquesne, faience pavement, 1550

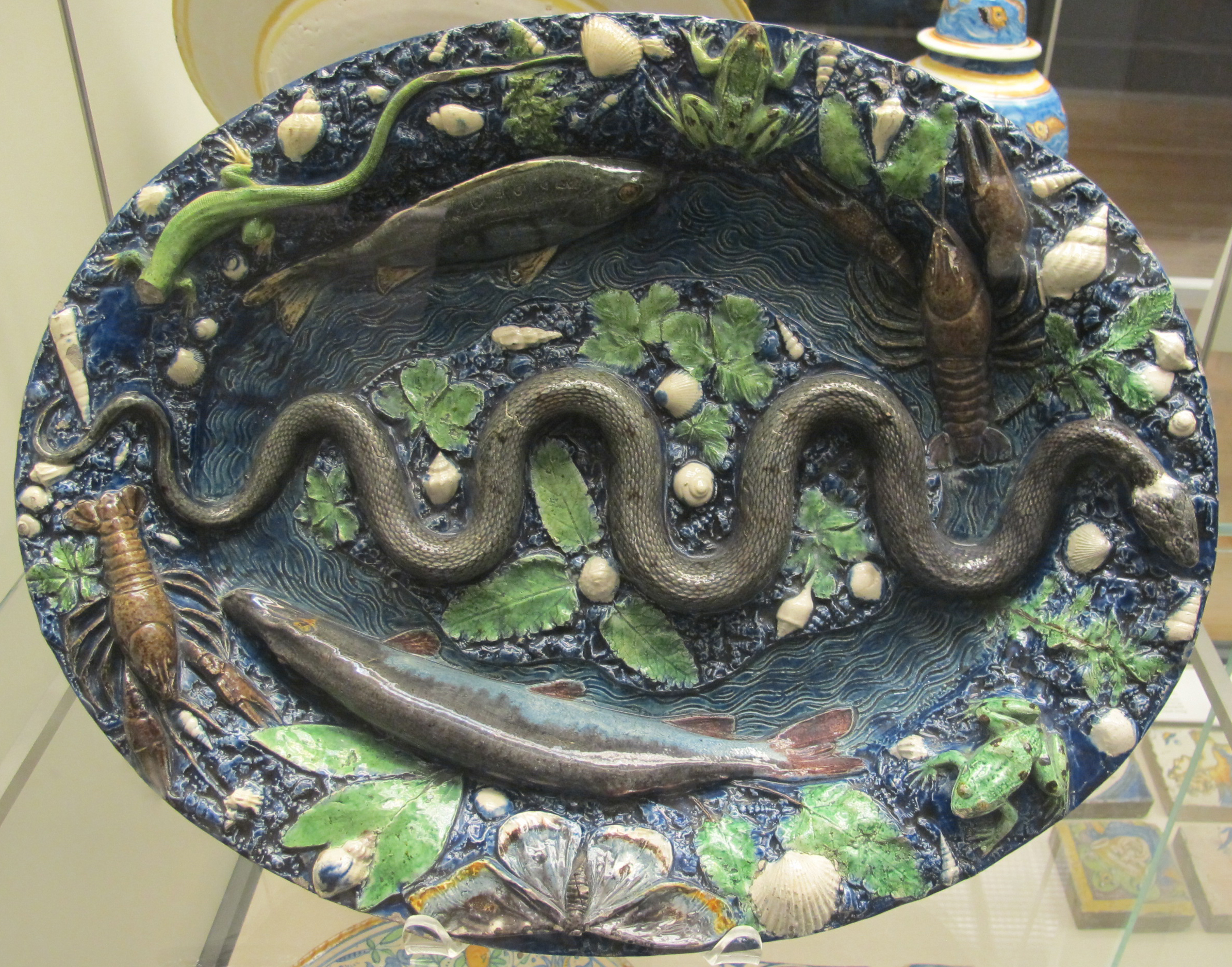
Bernard Palissy (attributed to), plate, 1575–1600

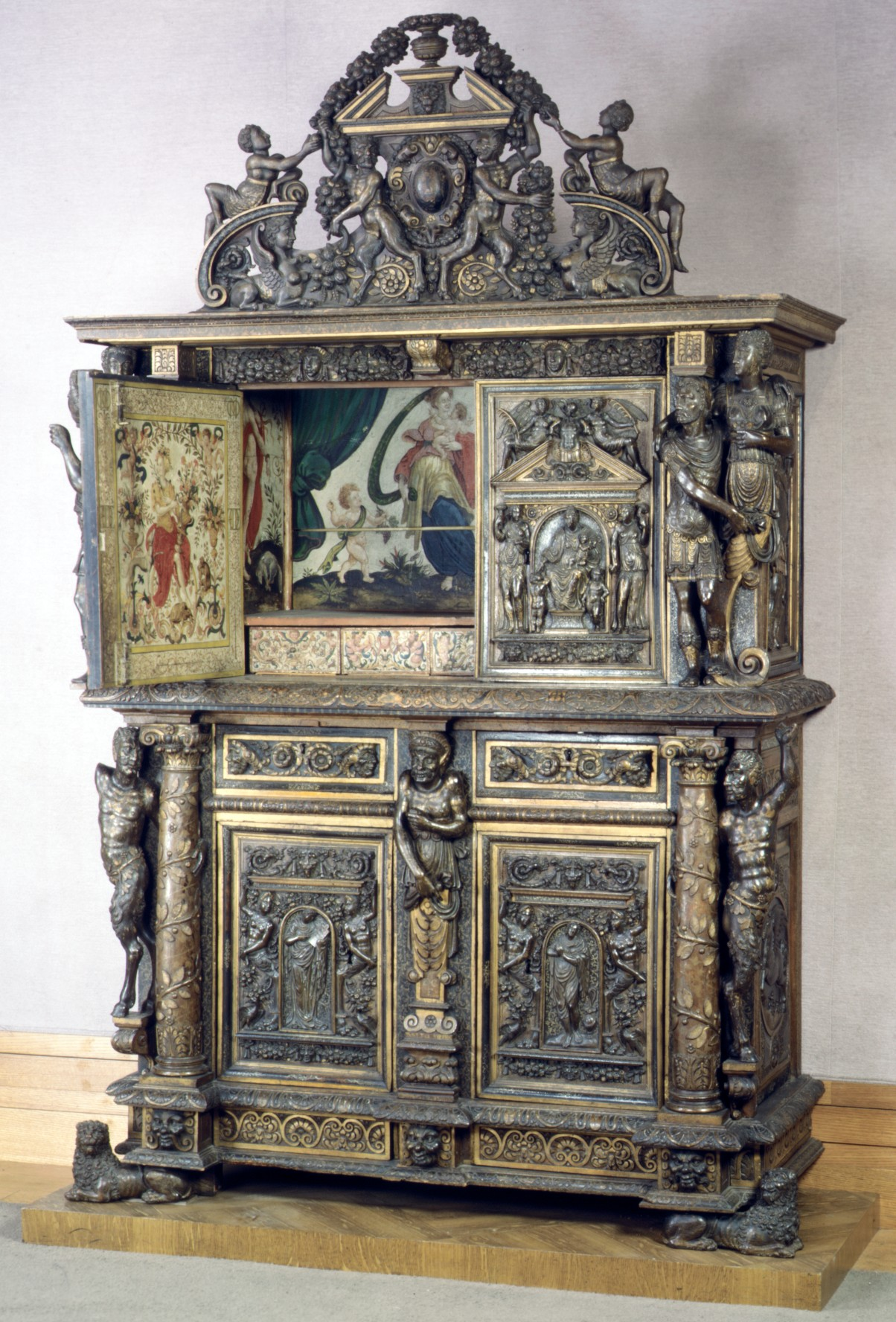
Cabinet by Hugues Sambin

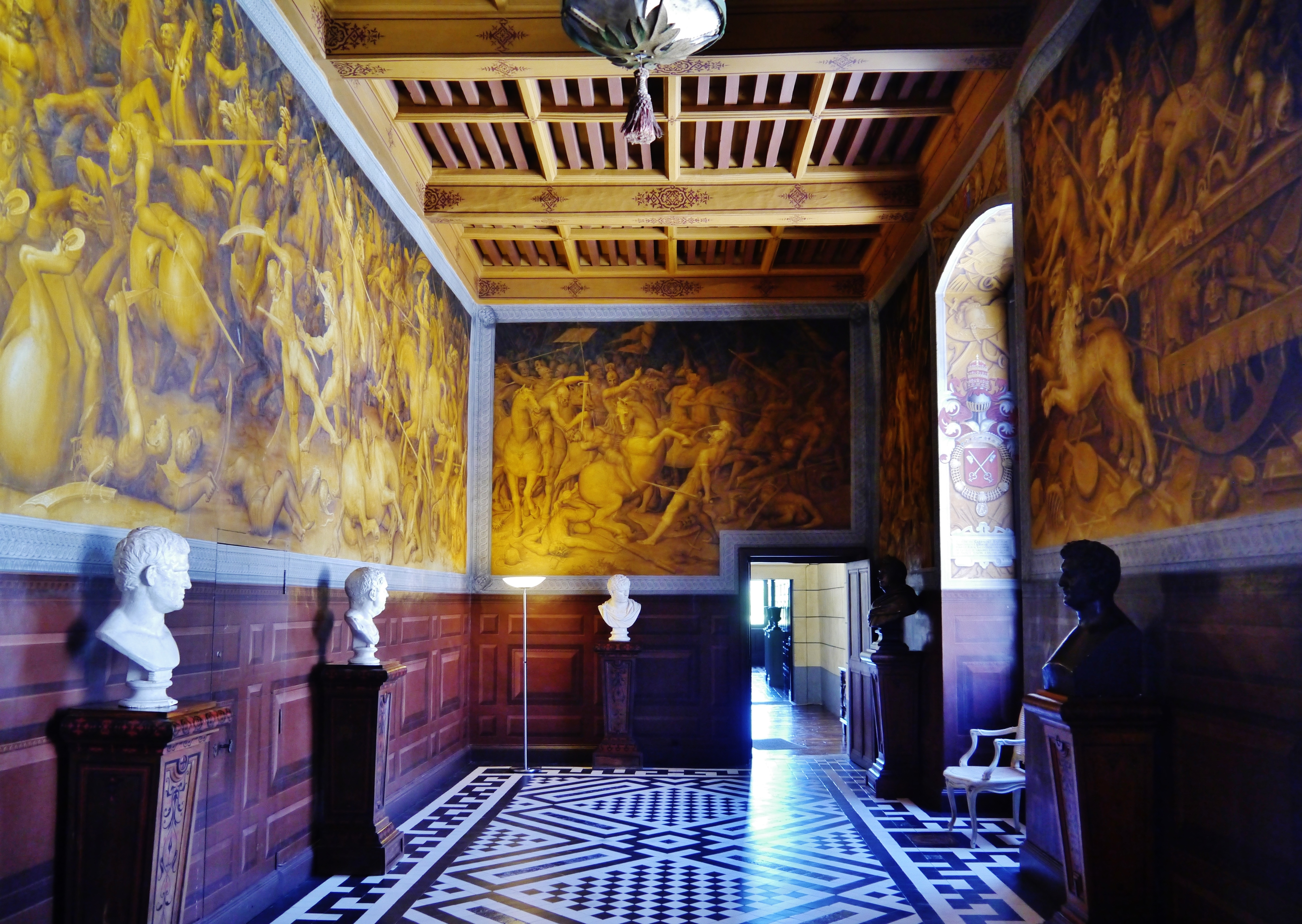
Pharsalus gallery of the Château d'Ancy-le-Franc, 1560s

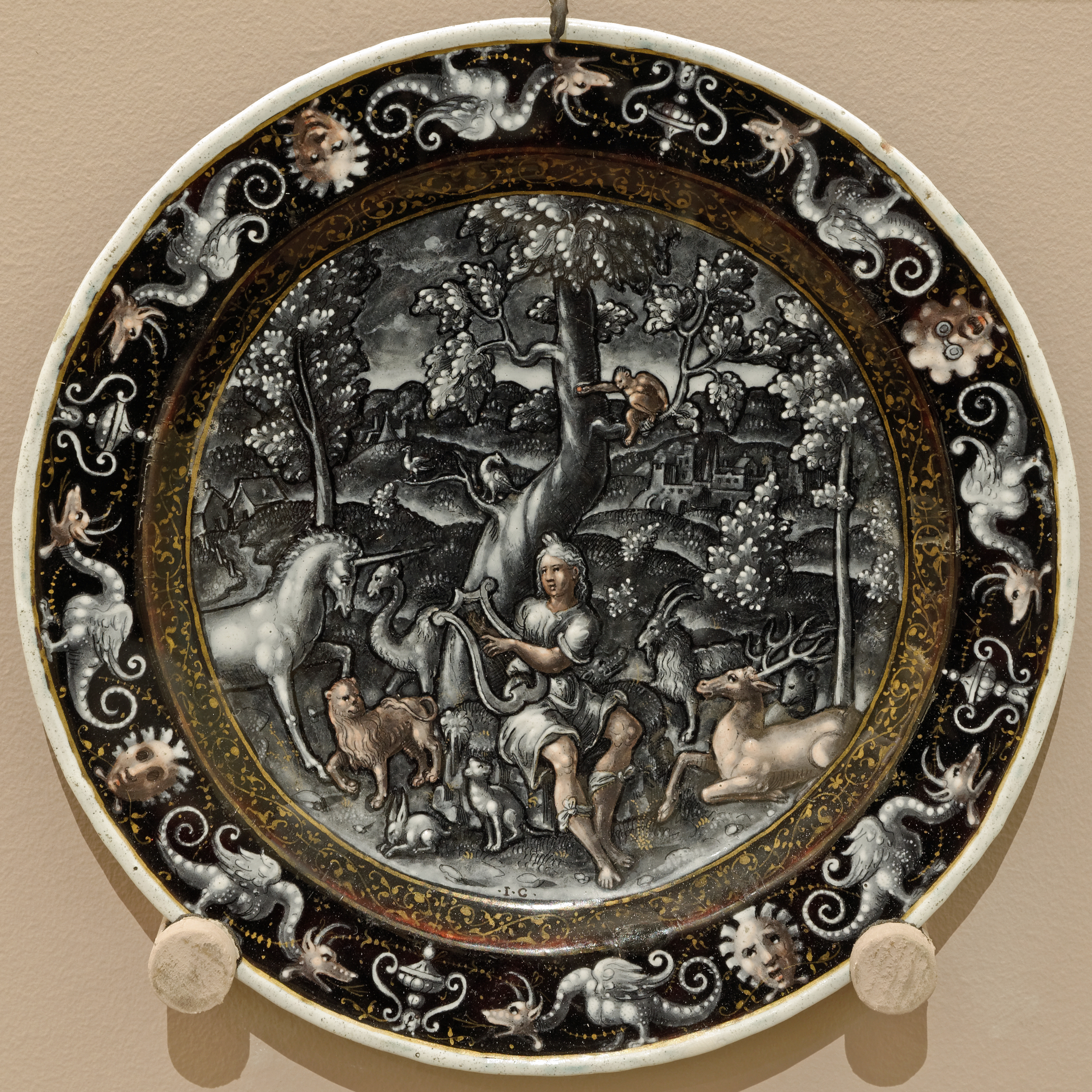
Master I. C, Limoges enamel plate, Second half of the 16th-century

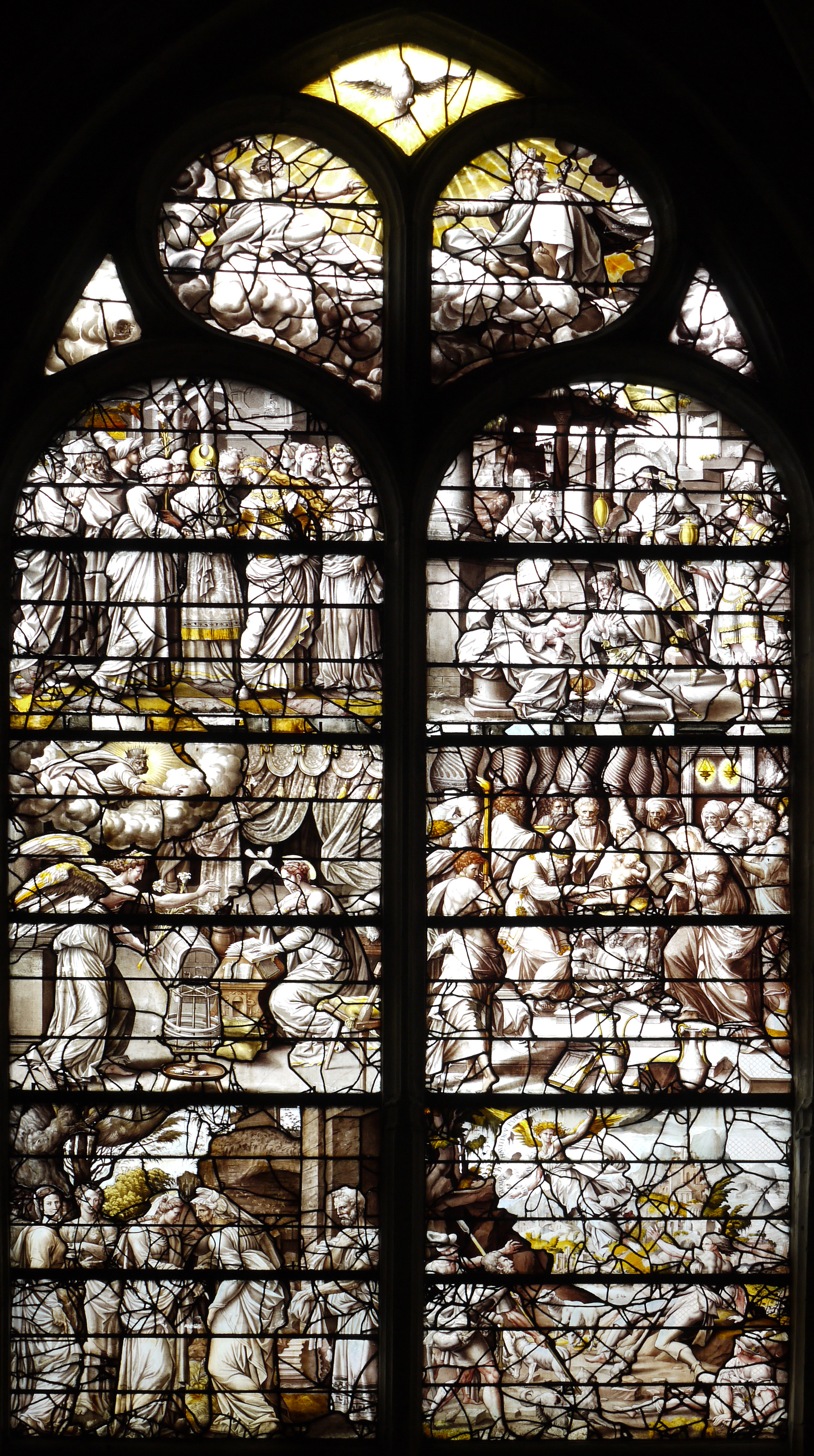
1545 stained glass window in Saint-Gervais Saint-Protais church in Gisors

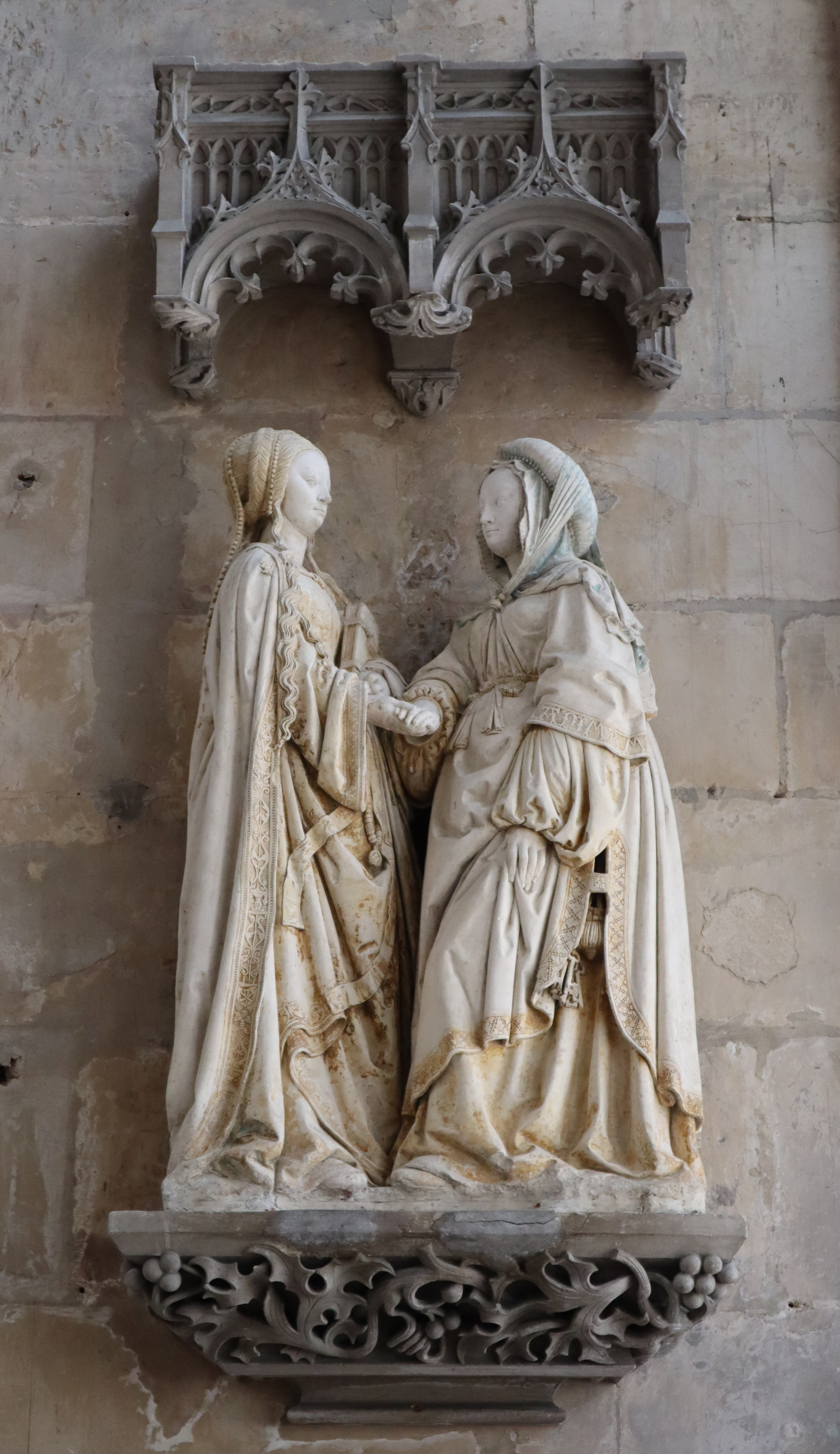
Visitation, 1520 c., Troyes, Church of Saint-Jean-au-Marché

==== Baroque and Classicism ====
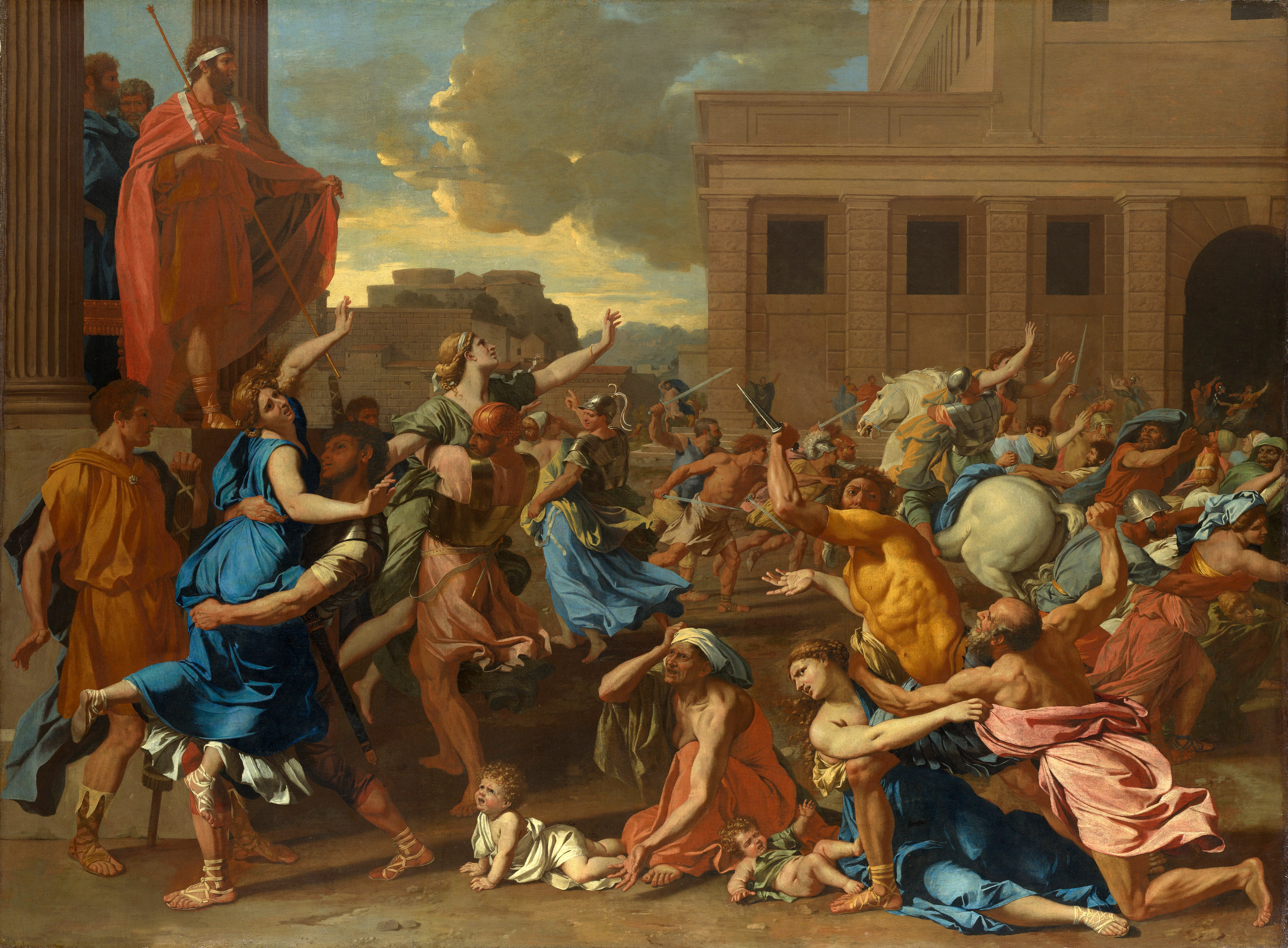
The abduction of the Sabines by Nicolas Poussin, 1634-35.

The seventeenth century marked a golden age for French art in all fields as the country recovered from its Wars of Religion and established itself as the leading European political power under the reigns of Henry IV, Louis XIII and Louis XIV. In the early part of the seventeenth century, late mannerist and early Baroque tendencies continued to flourish in the court of Marie de Medici and her son Louis XIII. Art from this period shows influences from both the north of Europe, namely the Dutch and Flemish schools, and from Roman painters of the Counter-Reformation. Artists in France frequently debated the contrasting merits of Peter Paul Rubens with his Flemish baroque, voluptuous lines and colors to Nicolas Poussin with his rational control, proportion, Roman classicist baroque style. Another proponent of classicism working in Rome was Claude Gellée, known as Le Lorrain, who defined the form of classical landscape.

Many young French painters of the beginning of the century went to Rome to train themselves and soon assimilated Caravaggio's influence, for example Valentin de Boulogne and Simon Vouet. The latter is credited with bringing the baroque in France and at his return to Paris in 1627 he was named first painter of the king. But French painting soon departed from the extravagance and naturalism of Italian baroque, and painters such as Eustache Le Sueur and Laurent de La Hyre, following Poussin's example, developed a classicist way known as Parisian Atticism, inspired by Antiquity, and focusing on proportion, harmony and the importance of drawing. Even Vouet, after his return from Italy, changed his manner to a more measured but still highly decorative and elegant style.

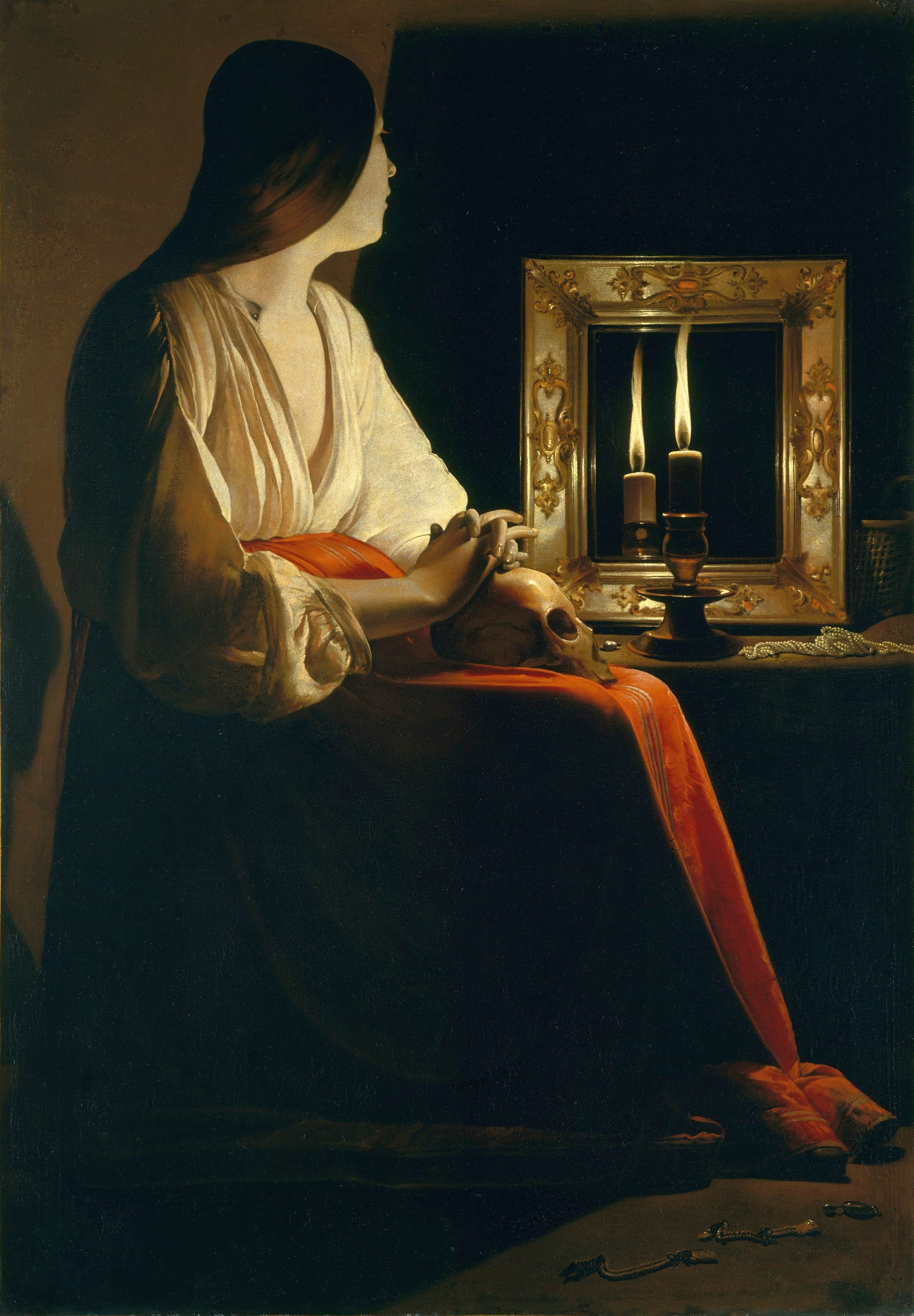
Georges de La Tour, The Penitent Magdalene, c. 1640.

But at the same time there was still a strong Caravaggisti school represented by the amazing candle-lit paintings of Georges de La Tour, who was mainly active in his native Lorraine but also worked for a short period of time in Paris. The wretched and the poor were featured in a quasi-Dutch manner in the paintings by the three Le Nain brothers. In the paintings of Philippe de Champaigne there are both propagandistic portraits of first minister Cardinal Richelieu and other more contemplative portraits of people in the Catholic Jansenist sect.

In architecture, architects such as Salomon de Brosse, who built the Luxembourg Palace in Paris, François Mansart and Jacques Lemercier helped define the French form of the baroque. They developed the formula of the urban hôtel particulier that was to influence all of Europe and strongly departed from the Italian equivalent, the palazzo. Many aristocratic castles were rebuilt in the new classic-baroque style, some of the most famous being Maisons by Mansart and Cheverny, characterized by high roofs "à la française" and a form that retained the medieval model of the castle adorned with prominent towers, now converted in elegant pavilions.

From the mid to late seventeenth century, French art is more often referred to by the term "Classicism" which implies an adherence to certain rules of proportion and sobriety uncharacteristic of the Baroque, as it was practiced in most of the rest of Europe during the same period. Under Louis XIV, the Baroque as it was practiced in Italy, was not in French taste, for instance, as Bernini's famous proposal for redesigning the Louvre was rejected by Louis XIV. Through propaganda, wars, and great architectural works, Louis XIV launched a vast program designed for the glorification of France and his name. The Palace of Versailles, initially a tiny hunting lodge built by his father, was transformed by Louis XIV into a marvelous palace for fêtes and parties, under the direction of architects Louis Le Vau (who had also built the château de Vaux-le-Vicomte) and Jules Hardouin Mansart (who built the church of the Invalides in Paris), painter and designer Charles Le Brun, and the landscape architect André Le Nôtre who perfected the rational form of the French garden that from Versailles spread in all of Europe. In portrait painting, two figures emerged in the 1680s with the portraitists Hyacinthe Rigaud and Nicolas de Largillière, whose theatrical yet psychologically refined portraits set a new model for the 18th century.

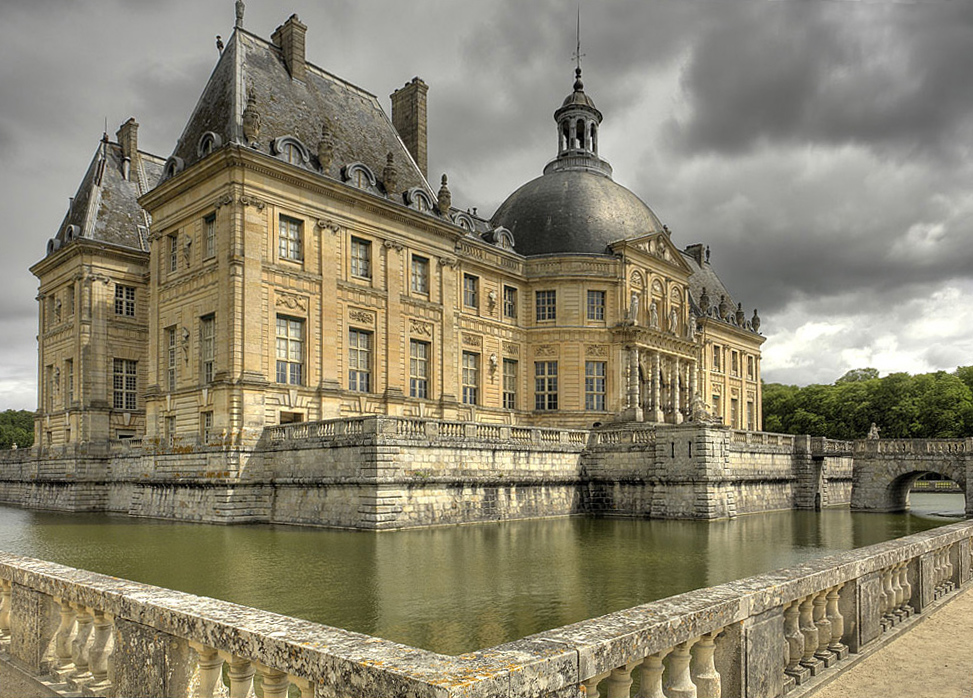
Château de Vaux-le-Vicomte by Louis Le Vau.

French sculpture of the 17th-century moved away from late Mannerism to a more sophisticated, classical yet grand style in the 1630s thanks to the likes of Jacques Sarazin, Simon Guillain and the Anguier brothers. The many châteaux, hôtels particuliers, churches' altarpieces and funerary monuments that were built over the century meant that the demand for sculpture was high and many skilled artists flourished. French sculpture also found its own distinctive way in the pursuit of classicism, particularly during the reign of Louis XIV, which proved to be a seminal moment for the development of sculpture thanks to the King's protection of artists such as Pierre Puget (who was also active in Italy), François Girardon, Antoine Coysevox and Nicolas Coustou. They all produced sculptures for the gardens of Versailles and then Marly and the Invalides, where ambitious decorative programs involved tens of sculptors, and also extensivly worked for the high nobility. In Rome, where many young French sculptors were sent to study Antiquity and the Renaissance, Pierre Legros the Younger, working in a more baroque manner, was one of the most influential sculptors of the end of the century alongside Pierre-Étienne Monnot.

Outside of Paris and other major centers, the 17th-century saw significant activity in the redecoration of religious buildings in the provinces, with the creation of countless elaborate altarpieces and reredos in stone or wood—works, combining architecture, painting, and sculpture. They were produced by local workshops in a style decidedly more Baroque and decorative than the one in vogue at court. Some of these workshops enjoyed great success over several generations and developed vernacular styles that spread throughout various regions. This was the case with the altarpiece makers of Laval, a town near which black and red marble quarries were discovered, and whose style spread to the provinces of Maine, Anjou, Tourraine and eastern Brittany, with artists such as Pierre Corbineau and Tugal Caris, who were often both architects and sculptors. In western Brittany, local artists developed a different genre, based on very elaborate and highly carved wooden and painted altars. In southern France, dynasties of sculptors and architects were very active in the Pyrenees, with the Ferrère dynasty of altarpiece makers for instance, and in Provence where highly-trained sculptors like Christophe Veyrier or the members of the Péru family in Avignon were active, building palaces, churches, fountains and altarpieces alike.

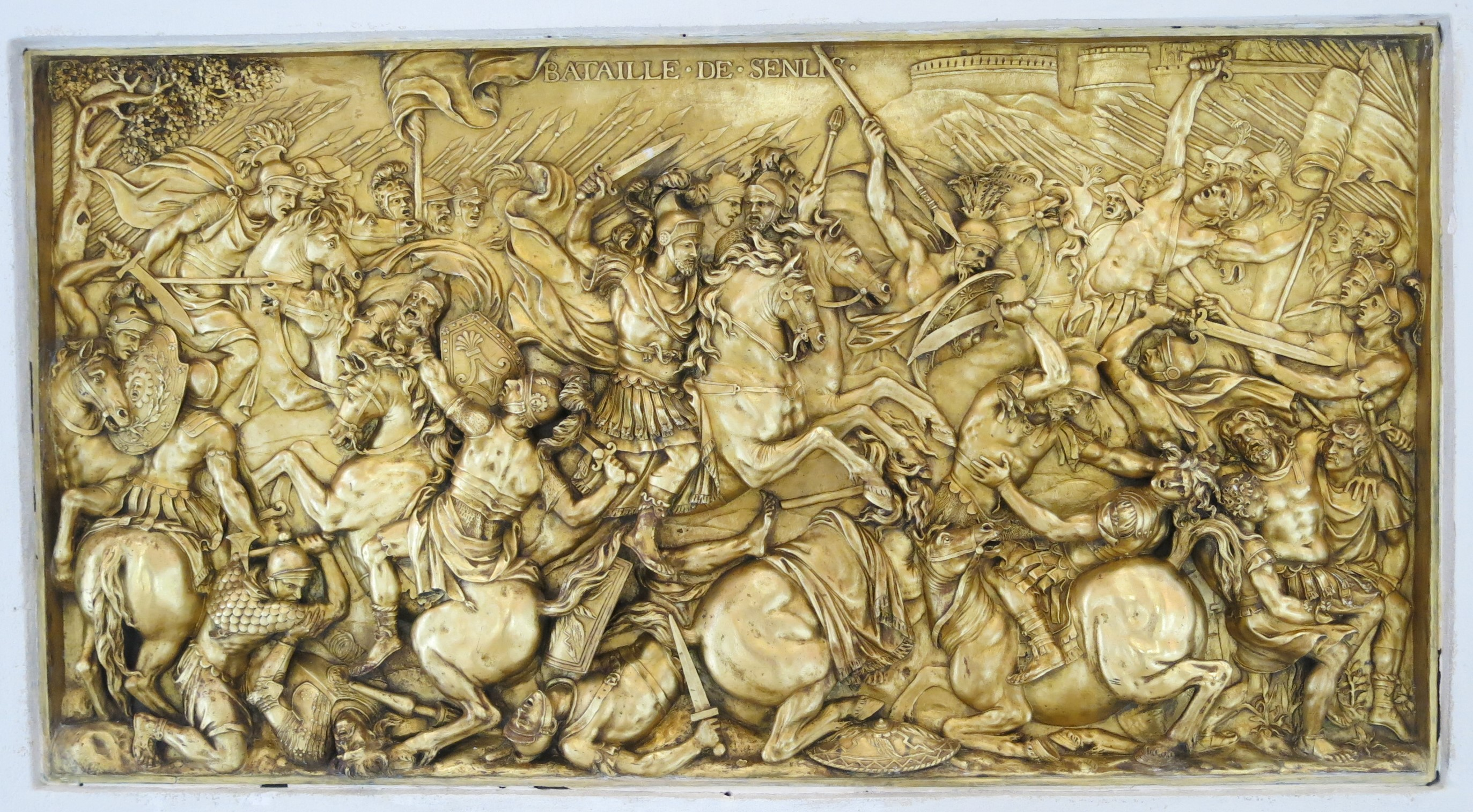
François Anguier, The battle of Senlis, 1661-1663, bronze relief from the Funerary monument of Henri I of Longueville.

The 17th-century also saw an important renewal in printmaking, France (especially Paris and the Duchy of Lorraine) becoming one of the main centers for engraving and etching. At the beginning of the century, Jacques Bellange worked in Lorraine with a refined style still influenced by mannerism, producing expressive etchings full of emotion intricated with a feminine elegance. Another of the main engravers of the period was also from Lorraine: Jacques Callot. He made important technical advances to printmaking, developing the échoppe, a type of etching-needle with a slanting oval section at the end, which enabled etchers to create a swelling line, as engravers were able to do. He produced more than 1,400 etchings that chronicled the life of his period, featuring soldiers, clowns, drunkards, Romani, beggars, as well as court life, like in his series The Miseries and Misfortunes of War (1632–33). One of Callot's devotees, Abraham Bosse, was active in Paris. He spread Callot's innovations all over Europe with the first published manual of etching. His combination of very carefully depicted grand interiors with relatively trivial domestic subjects was original and highly influential on French art. Also based in Paris, Claude Mellan was known for the technical virtuosity of his prints, thanks to an idiosyncratic technique, in which, instead of creating shade by cross-hatching, he used a system of parallel lines - a famous example being his Face of Christ (1649), created from a single spiralling line that starts at the tip of Jesus' nose. Finally, in the second half of the century emerged Robert Nanteuil, considered the undisputed master of French portrait engraving.

In the decorative arts, France pursued a state-impulsed policy favouring new state-owned or supervised factories to rival Italian, Flemish and Dutch productions: Nevers and Rouen faience factories, though private, were first granted royal monopolies in 1603 and 1647 respectively. They produced fine earthenware inspired from Italian and Asiatic styles and under Louis XIV worked extensively for the French crown. The Gobelins Manufactory in Paris, founded in 1601 with the support of Henry IV, was purchased by minister Jean-Baptiste Colbert on behalf of the French crown in 1662 and reorganized. It soon produced the most refined tapestries of Europe, while France also became the foremost European center for cabinetmaking and furniture production thanks to the ébénistes André-Charles Boulle (who invented the Boulle work style of furnituremaking, an inlay of tortoiseshell, brass and pewter into ebony) and Pierre Gole, who helped establish the fashionable Louis XIV style.

17th-century French art

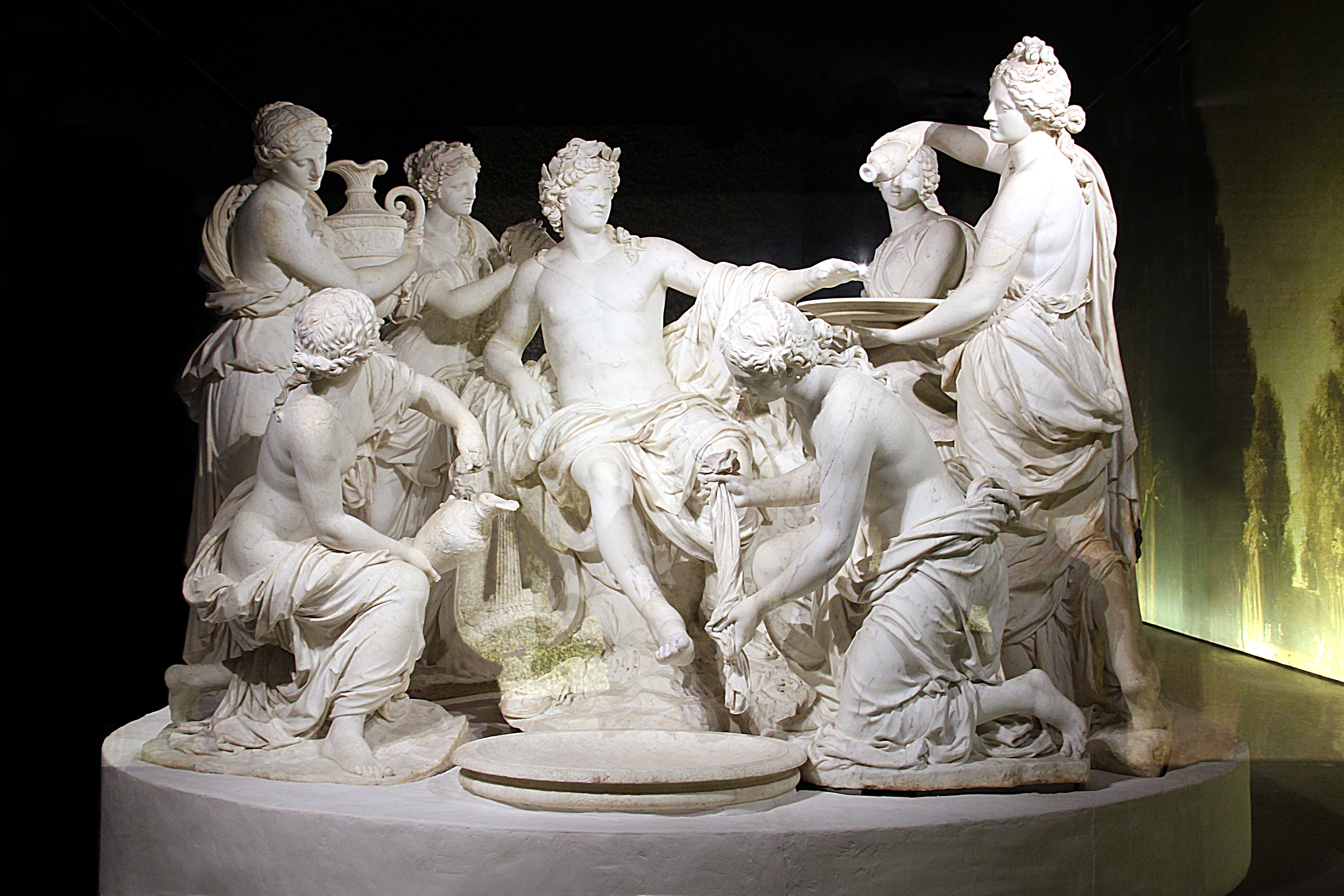
François Girardon, Apollo served by the Nymphs, 1667-1675

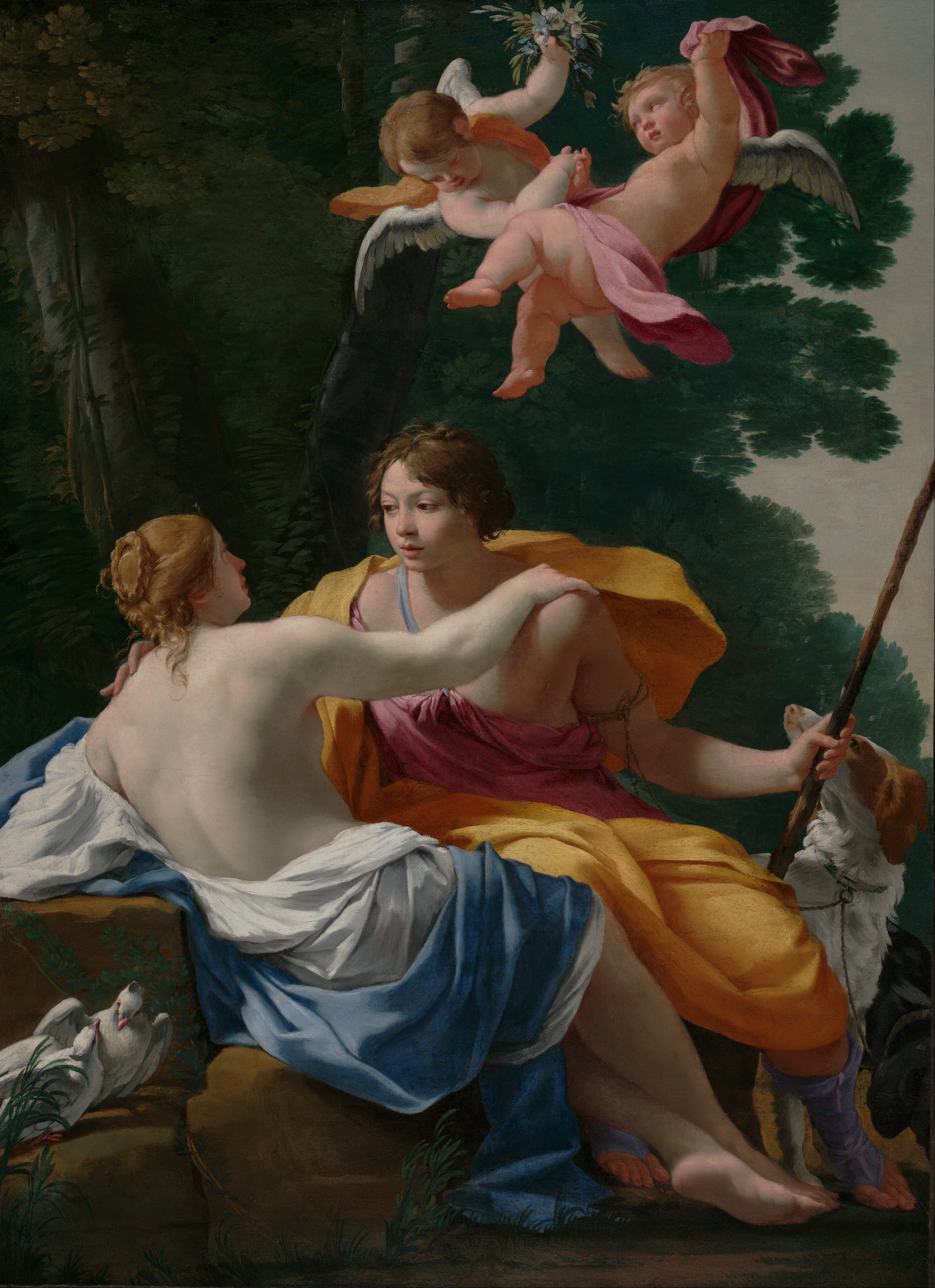
Simon Vouet, Venus and Adonis, c. 1642

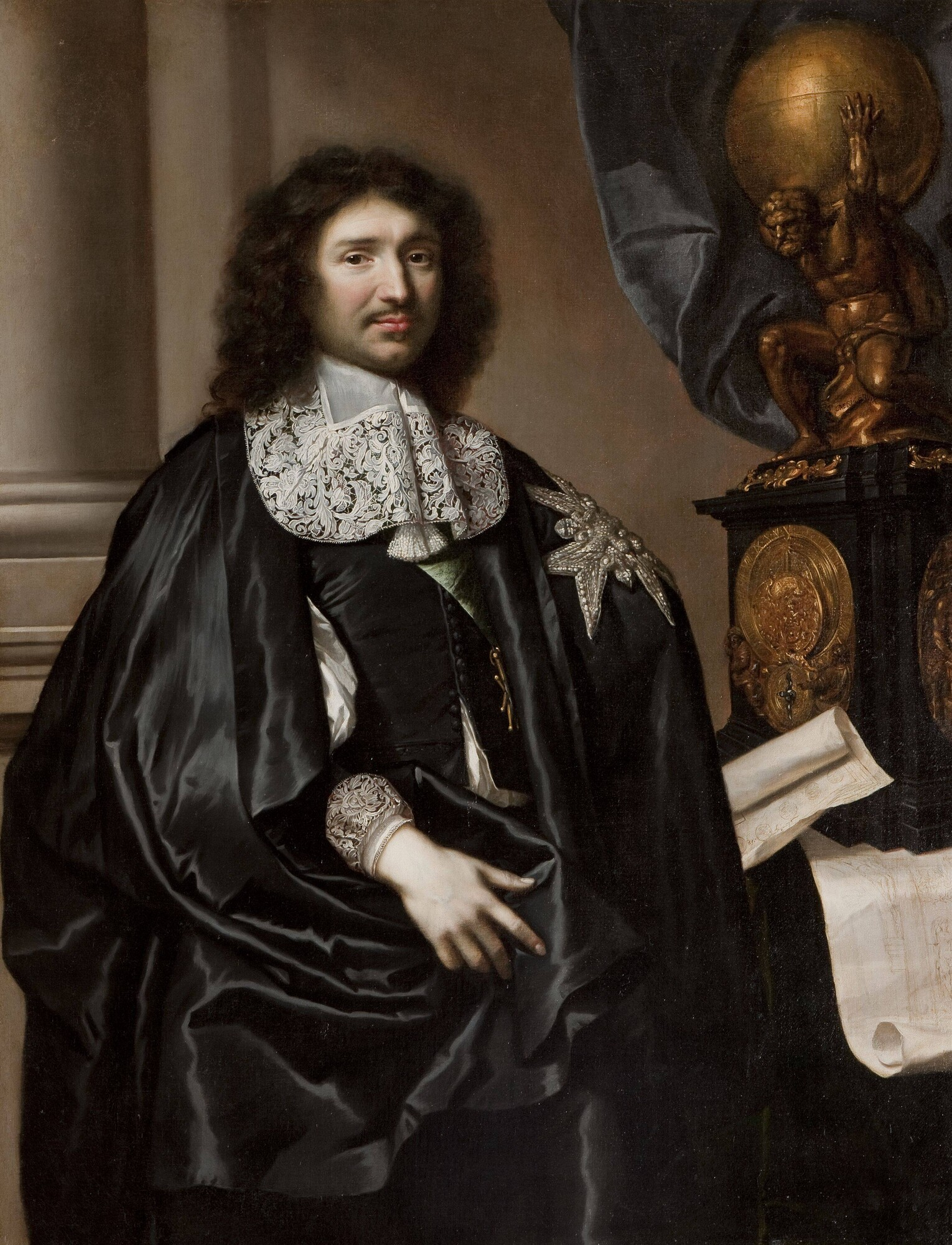
Claude Lefèbvre, Portrait of Jean-Baptiste Colbert, 1666

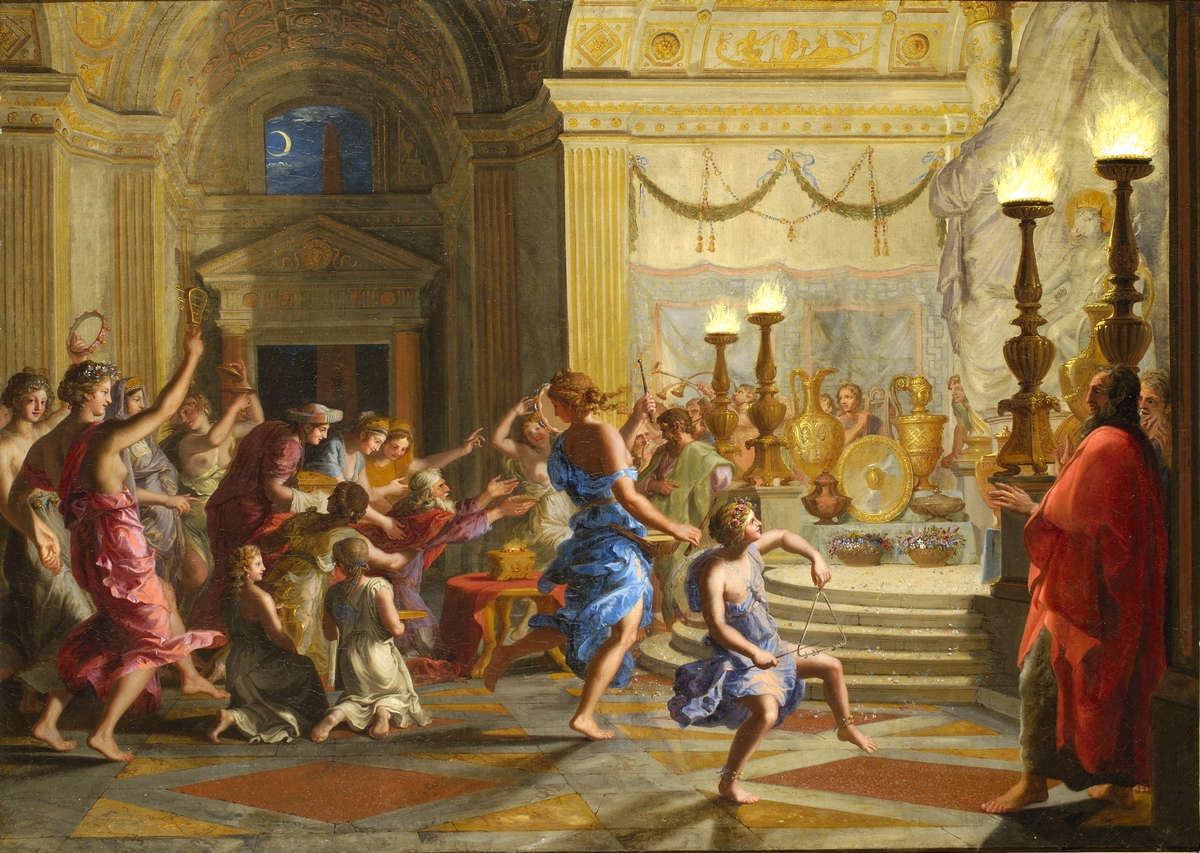
Jacques Stella, Solomon Worshipping Idols, 1647

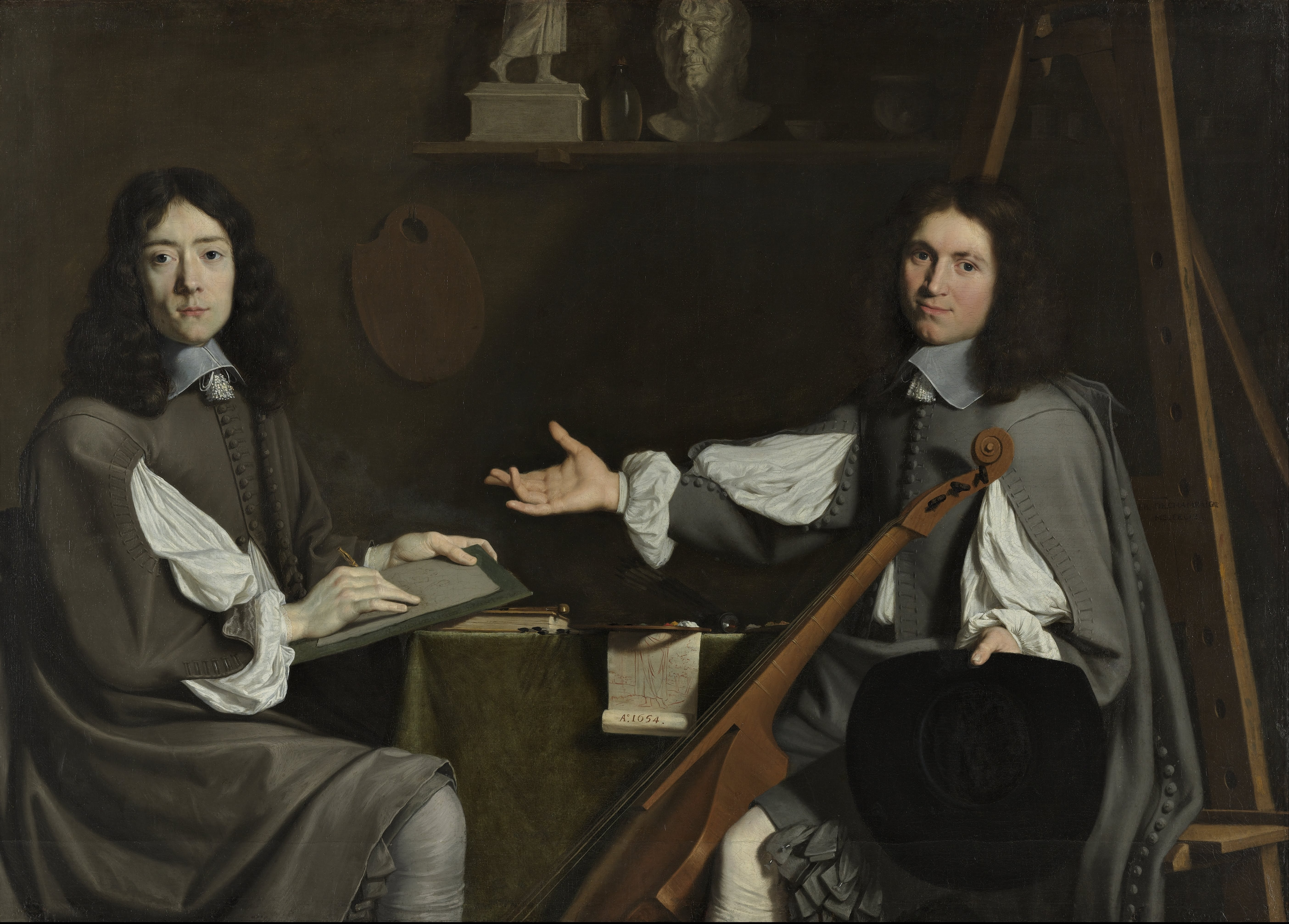
Jean Baptiste de Champaigne and Nicolas de Plattemontagne, Double Portrait of both Artists, 1654

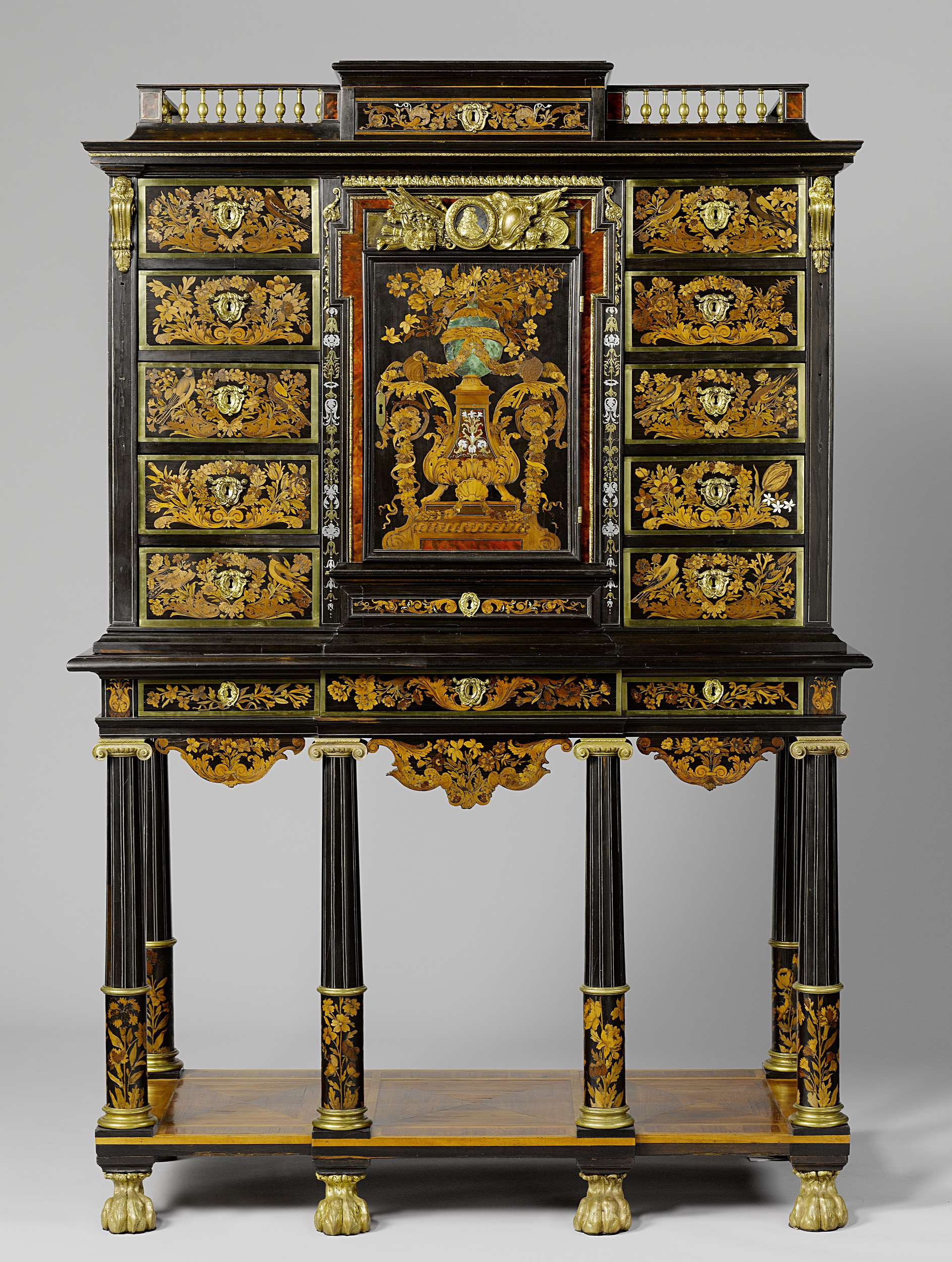
André-Charles Boulle, marqueterie cabinet, c. 1670-1675

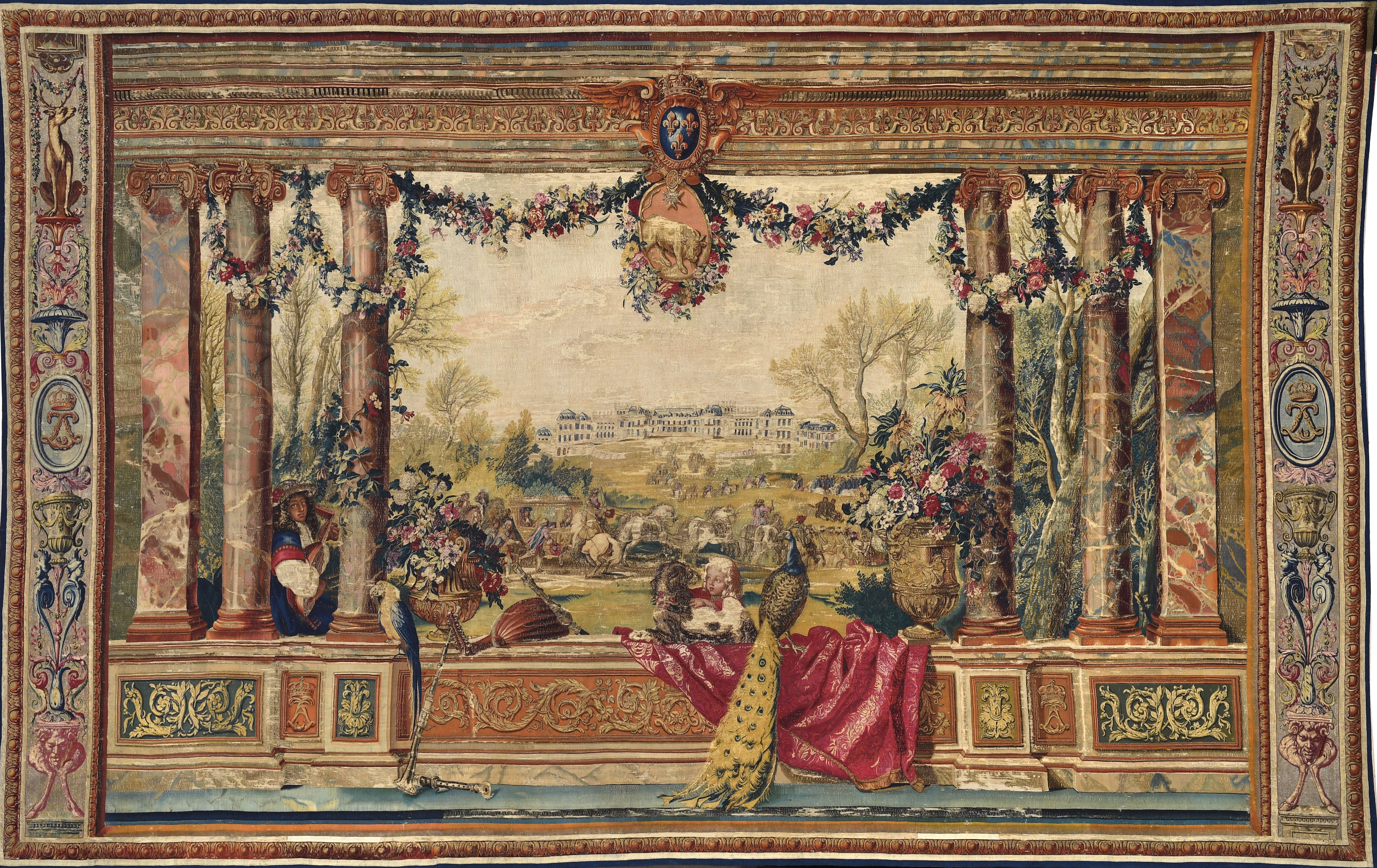
Gobelins Manufactory, Tenture des Mois ou des Maisons Royales, the month of April, 1668-1683, designed by Charles Le Brun

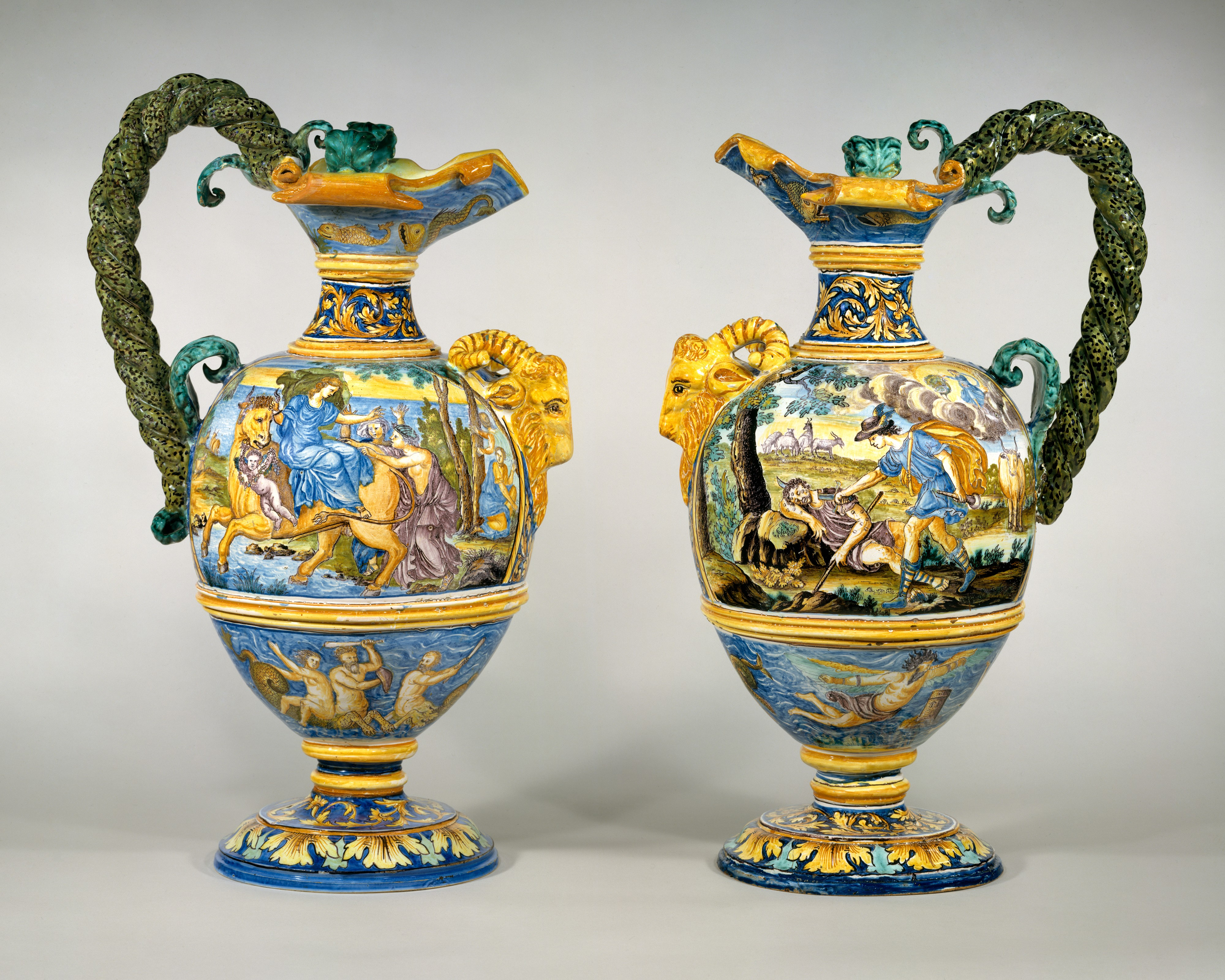
Nevers faience, Pair of wine jugs, c. 1685, depicting François Chauveau's Rape of Europa

==== Rococo and Neoclassicism ====
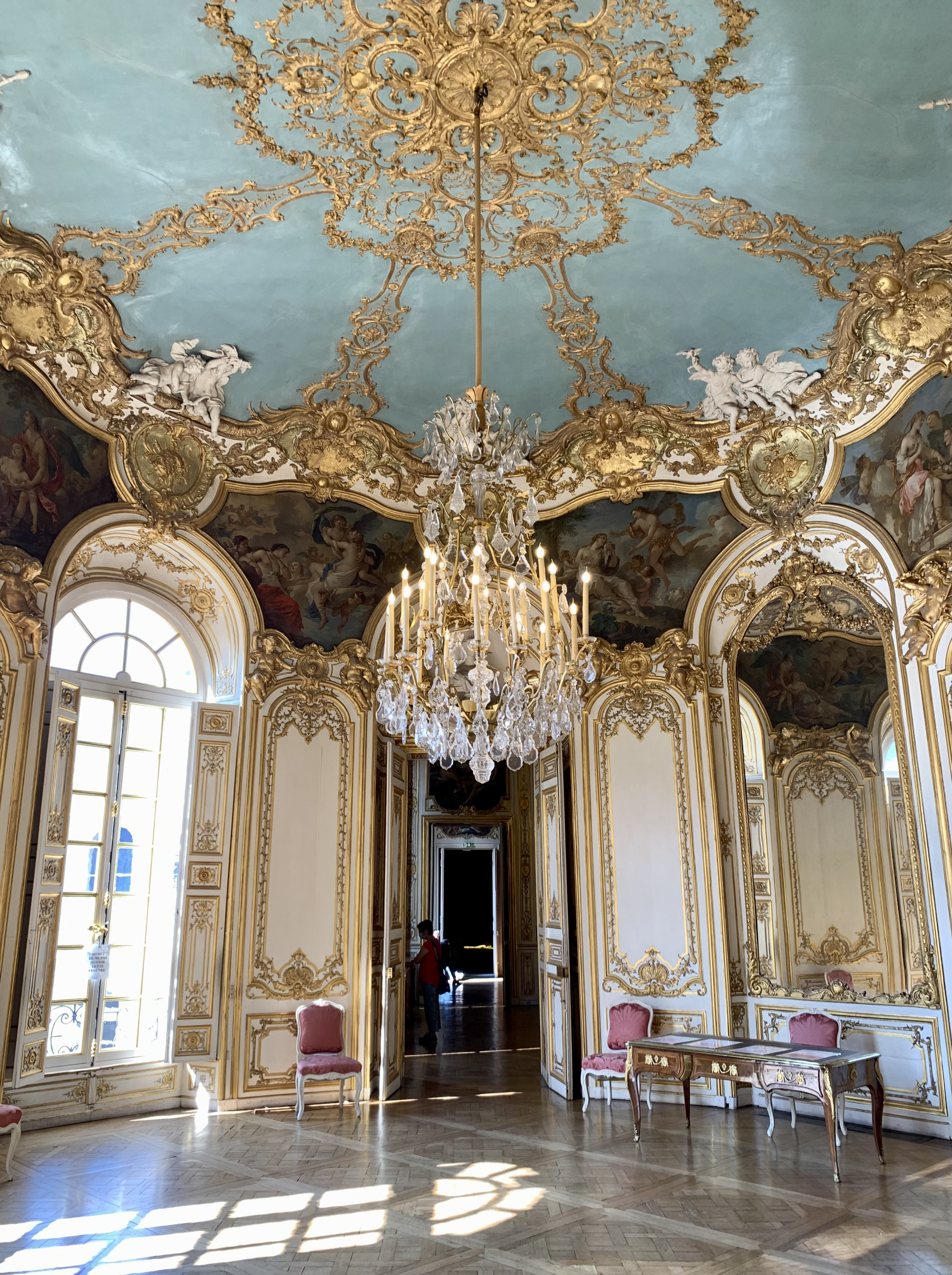
Boiseries of the Salon de la princesse by Germain Boffrand, hôtel de Soubise, Paris

Rococo and Neoclassicism are terms used to describe the visual and plastic arts and architecture in Europe from the early eighteenth century to the end of the eighteenth century. In France, the death of Louis XIV in 1715 led to a period of freedom commonly called the Régence. Versailles was abandoned from 1715 to 1722, the young king Louis XV and the government led by the duke of Orléans residing in Paris. There a new style emerged in the decorative arts, known as rocaille : the asymmetry and dynamism of the baroque was kept but renewed in a style that is less rhetoric and with less pompous effects, a deeper research of artificiality and use of motifs inspired by nature. This manner used to decorate rooms and furniture also existed in painting. Rocaille painting turned toward lighter subjects, such as the fêtes galantes, theater settings, pleasant mythological narratives and the female nude. Most of the time the moralising sides of myths or history paintings are omitted and the accent is put on the decorative and pleasant aspect of the scenes depicted. Paintings from the period show an emphasis more on color than drawing, with apparent brush strokes and very colorful scenes, reflecting the debates in the Royal Academy of painting, ultimately won by the Rubenists faction at the start of the century. Important French painters from this period include Antoine Watteau, considered the inventor of the fête galante, Nicolas Lancret and François Boucher, known for his gentle pastoral and galant scenes (especially his pastorales), and Jean-Marc Nattier, admired for its graceful and charming oil portraits of ladies at Louis XV's court. Pastel portrait painting became particularly fashionable in Europe at the time and France was the major center of activity for pastellists, with the prominent figures of Maurice Quentin de La Tour, Jean-Baptiste Perronneau and the Swiss Jean-Étienne Liotard. Other important artists in the genre of history painting during the first half of the century were François Lemoyne (who painted the vault of the Salon d'Hercule in the palace of Versailles), Jean-François de Troy, Carle Van Loo and Charles-Joseph Natoire.

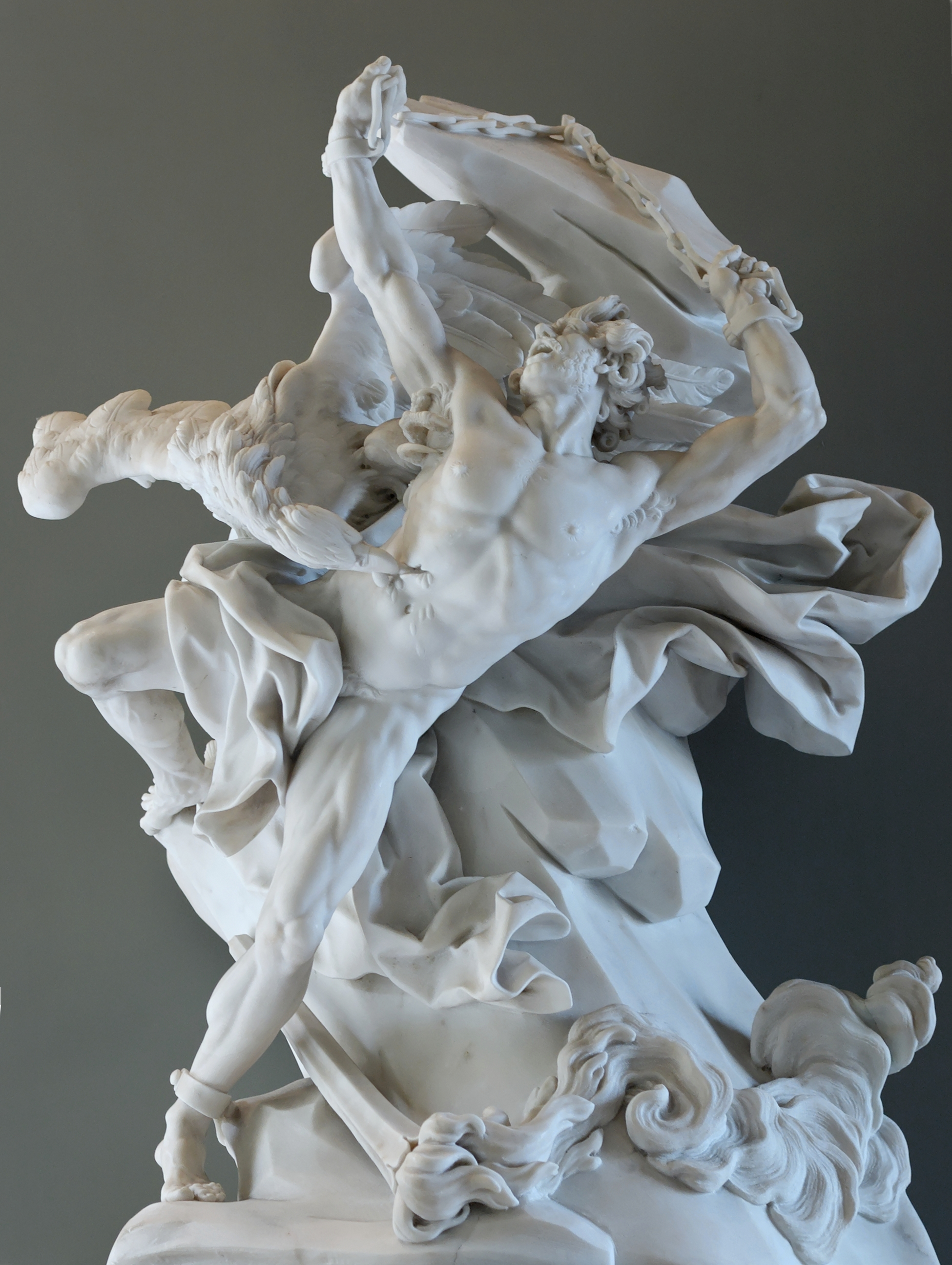
Prometheus by Nicolas-Sébastien Adam, 1762

The Louis XV style of decoration, although already apparent at the end of the last reign, was lighter with pastel colors, elaborate wood panels, smaller rooms, less gilding, and fewer brocades; shells, garlands, and occasional Chinese subjects predominated. The Chantilly, Vincennes and then Sèvres manufacturers produced some of the finest porcelain of the time. In the second half of the century the Limoges manufacture, established in 1771, was the first in France to produce hard-paste porcelain. The highly skilled ébénistes, cabinet-makers mostly based in Paris, created elaborate pieces of furniture with precious wood and bronze ornaments that were to be highly praised and imitated in all of Europe. The most famous are Jean-François Oeben, who created the work desk of king Louis XV in Versailles, Bernard II van Risamburgh, Jean-Henri Riesener, Martin Carlin and the chair-makers Georges Jacob and Jean-Baptiste-Claude Sené. Highly skilled artists, called the ciseleur-doreurs, specialized in bronze ornaments for furniture and other pieces of decorative arts - the most famous being Pierre Gouthière and Pierre-Philippe Thomire. Talented silversmiths such as Thomas Germain and his son François-Thomas Germain created elaborate silverware services that were highly praised by the various royalties of Europe. Rooms in châteaux and hôtels particuliers were more intimate than during the reign of Louis XIV and were decorated with rocaille style boiseries (carved wood panels covering the walls of a room) conceived by architects such as Germain Boffrand and Gilles-Marie Oppenord or ornemanistes (designers of decorative objects) such as Juste-Aurèle Meissonnier.

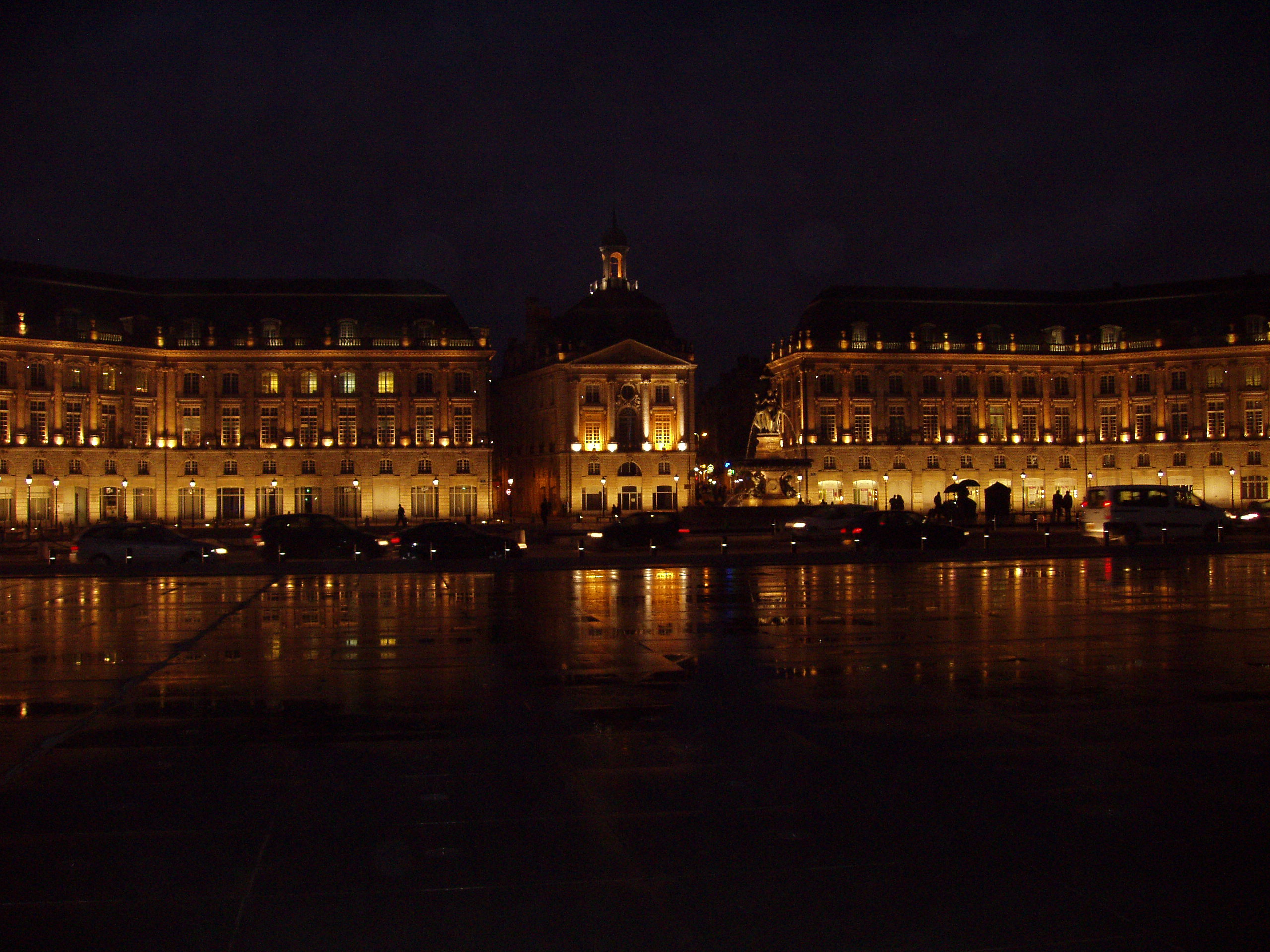
Place de la Bourse in Bordeaux by Ange-Jacques Gabriel

The most prominent architects of the first half of the century were, apart Boffrand, Robert de Cotte and Ange-Jacques Gabriel, who designed public squares such as the place de la Concorde in Paris and the place de la Bourse in Bordeaux in a style consciously inspired by that of the era of Louis XIV. During the first half of the century, France replaced Italy as the artistic centre and main artistic influence in Europe and many French artists worked in other courts across the continent (like the painters Pierre Subleyras for Pope Benedict XIV in Rome, Antoine Pesne for the king of Prussia in Berlin, Jean Ranc and Louis-Michel van Loo for the king of Spain in Madrid, Philippe Jacques de Loutherbourg in London, the sculptors Étienne Maurice Falconet for Catherine the Great in Saint Petersburg and Louis-François Roubiliac in London or the ironworker Jean Tijou in England).

The most prominent sculptors of the first half of the century were Guillaume Coustou the Elder, famous for his last royal commission, the Marly Horses (1743–1745), and his son Guillaume Coustou the Younger, Robert Le Lorrain, celebrated for his Sun Horses relief in the Hôtel de Rohan in Paris (1737), and Edmé Bouchardon, a precursor of neoclassicism, whose main public commission was the Fontaine des Quatre-Saisons (1739-1745) in Paris. He was also renowned for his marble busts of members of the high-nobility, reminiscent of the Antique.

1700-1750 French art

Antoine Watteau, The Embarkation for Cythera, 1718.

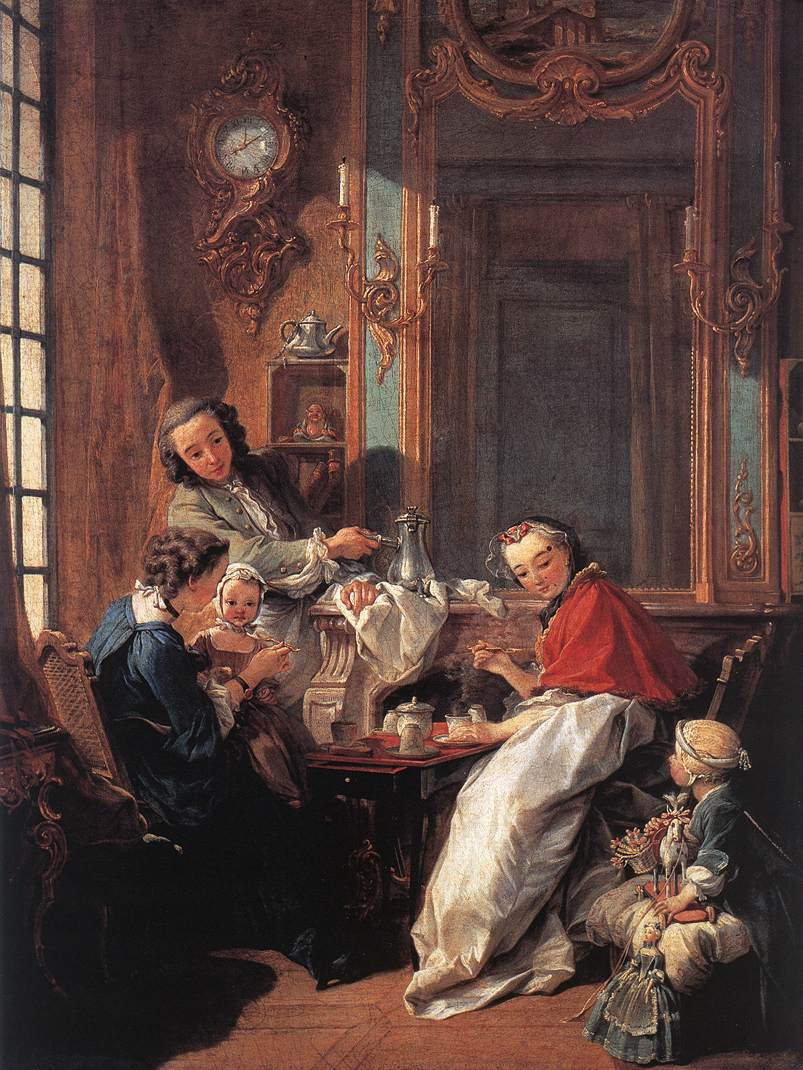
François Boucher, The Afternoon Meal, 1739.

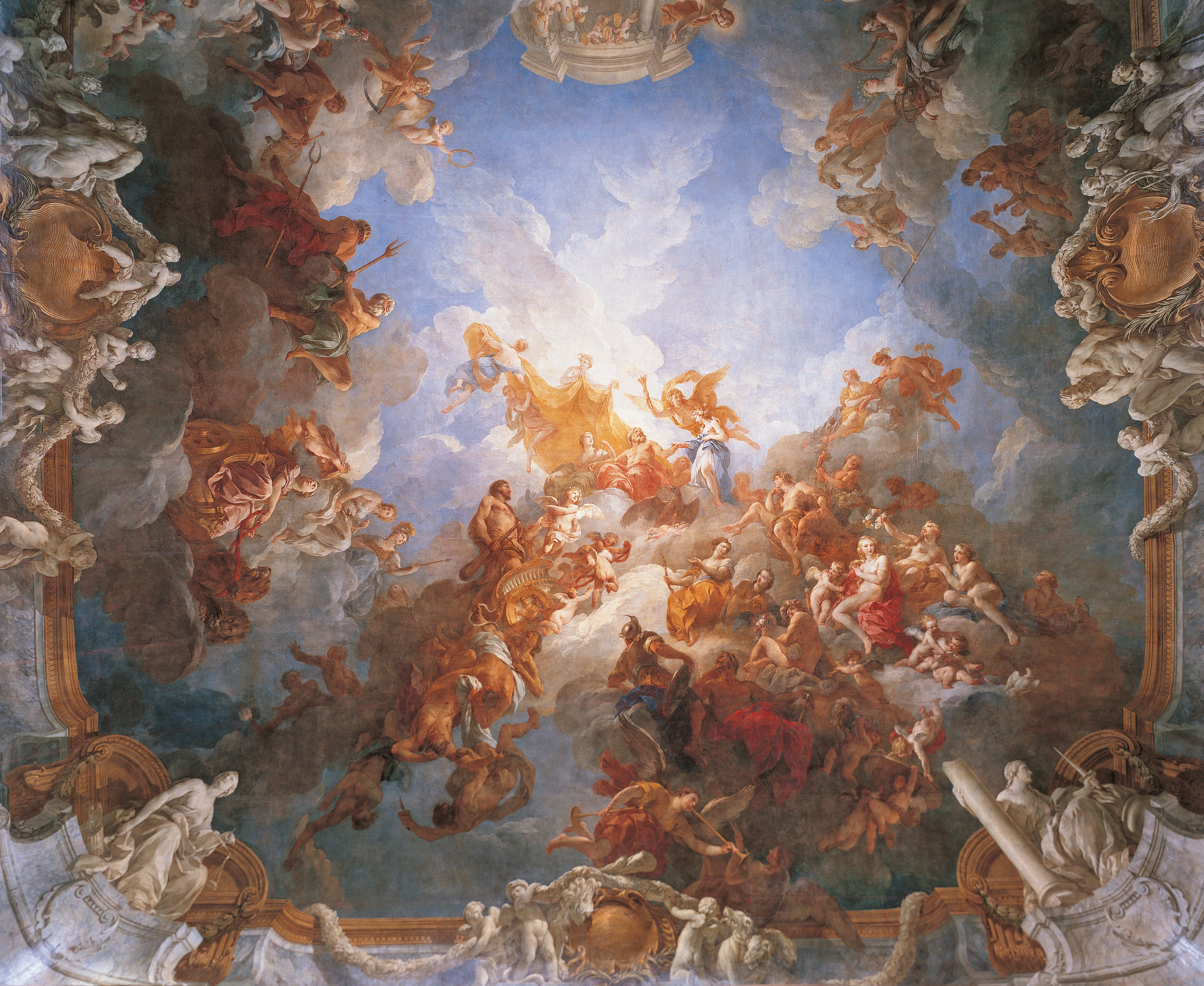
François Lemoyne, painted ceiling of the Salon d'Hercule, Palace of Versailles, 1733-1736.

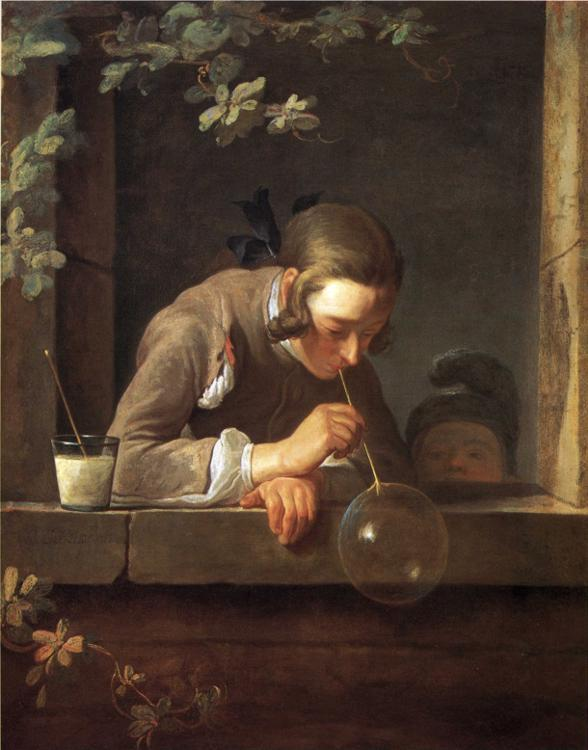
Jean Siméon Chardin, Soap bubbles, 1733-1735.

Juste-Aurèle Meissonnier, Covered Tureen on Stand (Pot-à-oille couvert), 1735-1738.

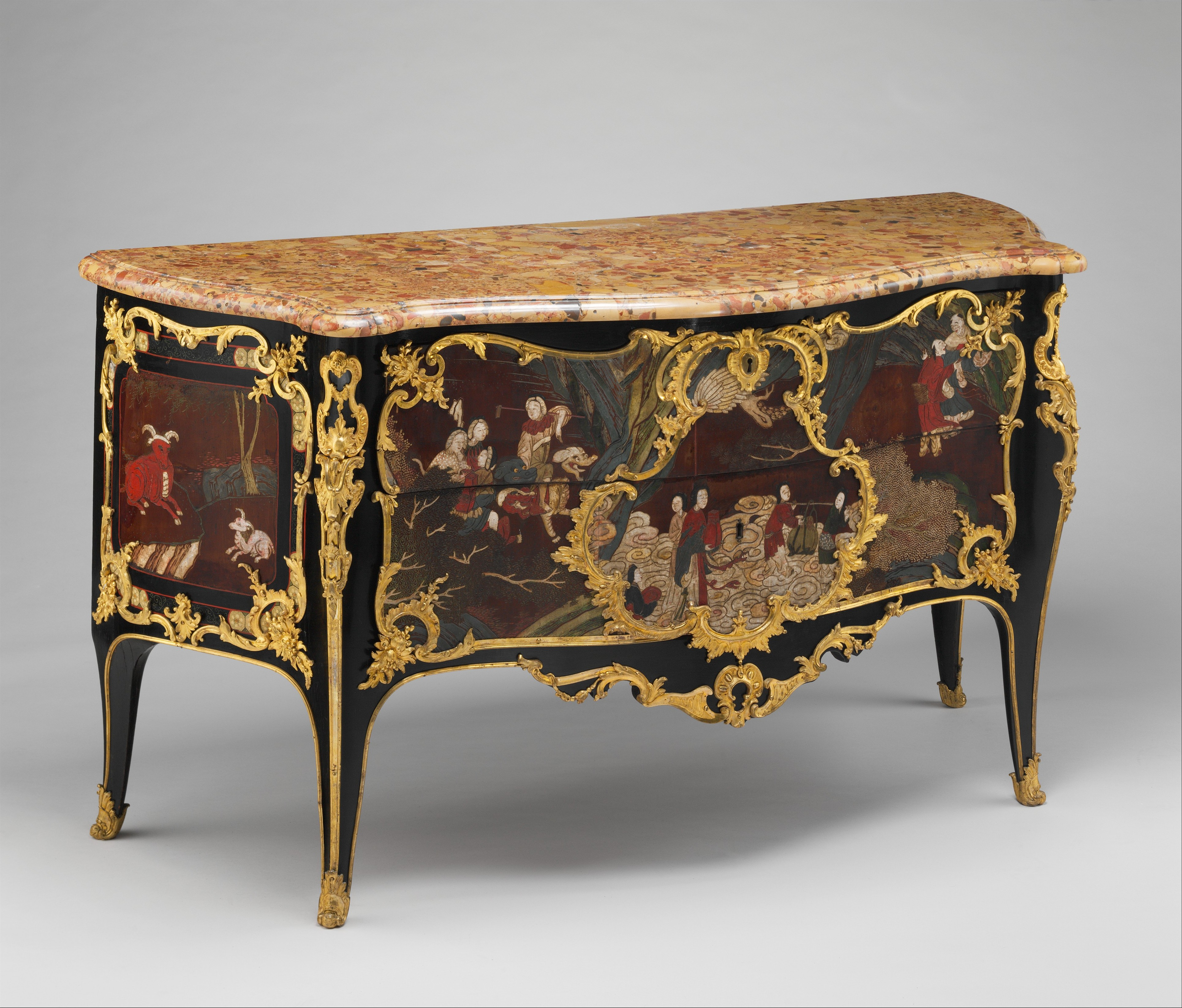
Bernard II van Risamburgh, Commode, c. 1740–45.

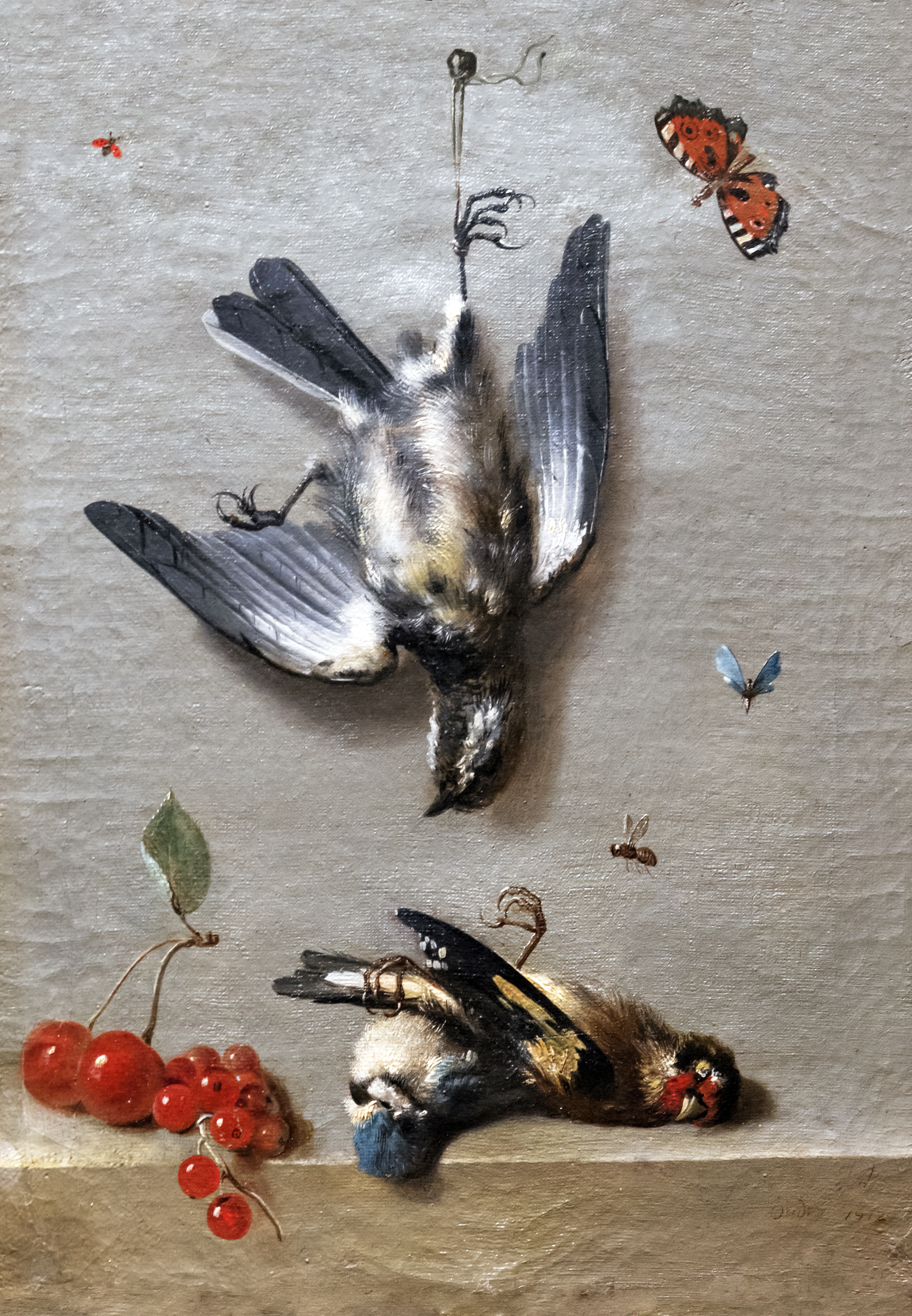
Jean-Baptiste Oudry, Still life with three dead birds, redcurrants, cherries and insects, 1712.

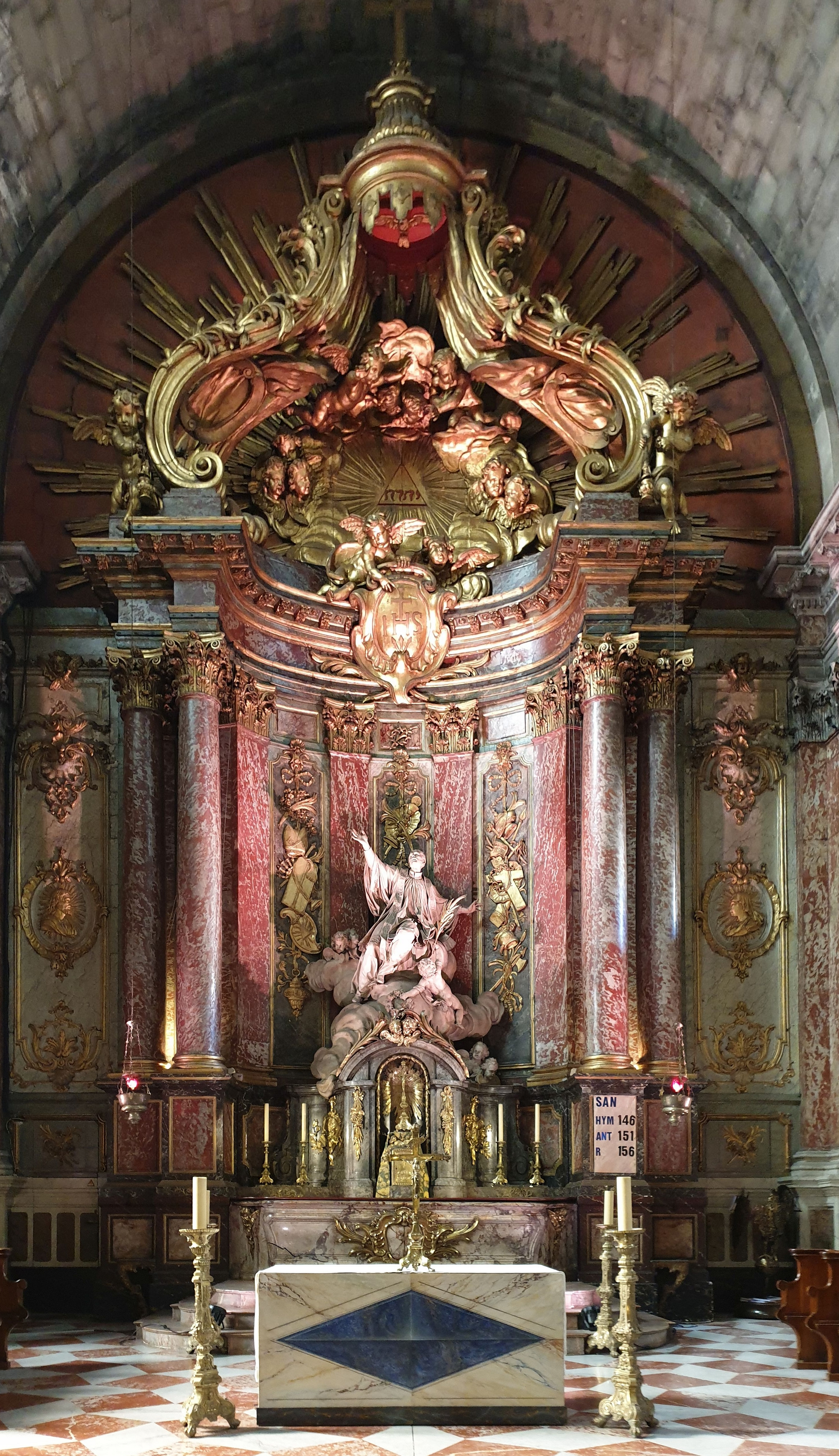
Guillaume Coustou the Younger and Pierre Vernet, Main altar of Saint-Saint-Paul-Saint-François-Xavier church in Bordeaux, 1741-1748.

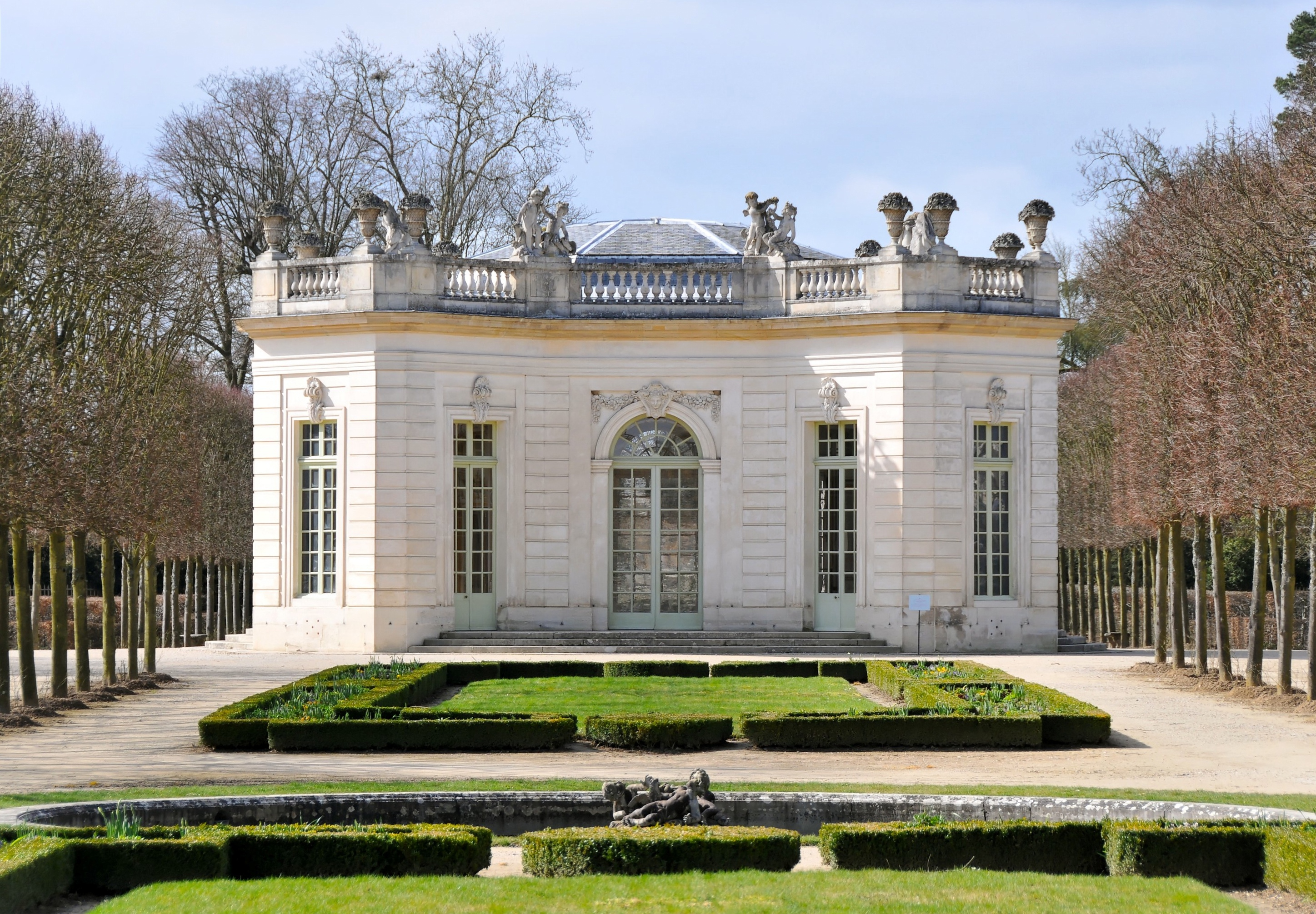
The Pavillon Français in the Palace of Versailles by Ange-Jacques Gabriel, 1750.

In the second half of the century the leading French sculptors were the portraitist Jean-Baptiste Lemoyne, known for his expressive portrait busts, both im marble and terracotta, which captured the passing nuances of expression and gave a sense of movement, Jean-Baptiste Pigalle, celebrated for his impressive funerary monument of Maurice de Saxe in Strasbourg (1753-1765) and his naked statue of Voltaire portrayed as an antique philosopher (1776), Étienne Maurice Falconet, who created the monumental Bronze Horseman equestrian monument in Saint Petersburg for Catherine the Great (1768–1782), and Clodion, known for his delicate and intimate terracotta reliefs.

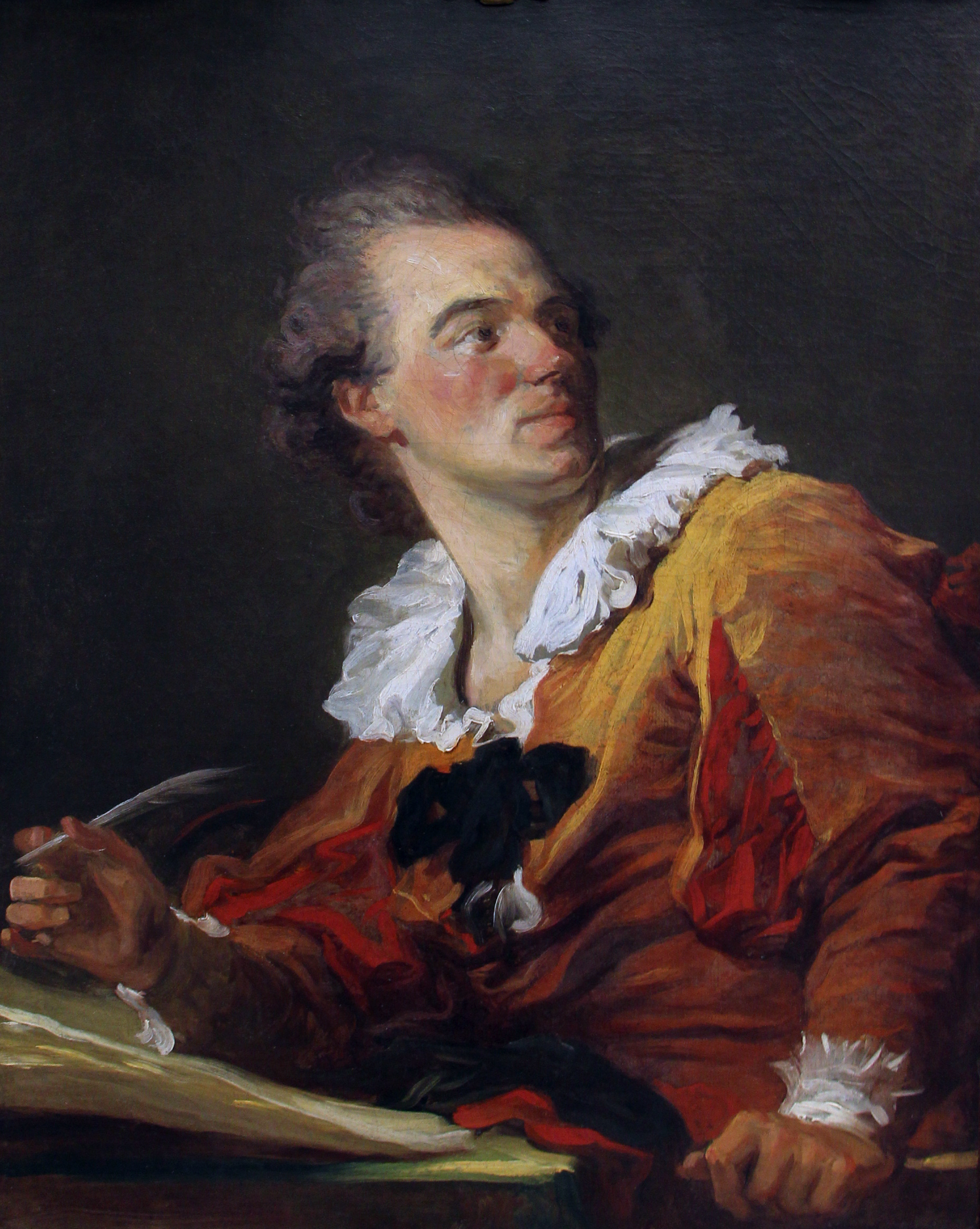
Inspiration by Jean-Honoré Fragonard, 1769

In the later part of the reign of Louis XV, sculptors began to give greater attention to the faces and give way to the principles of neoclassicism. The leaders of this new style were Jean-Antoine Houdon, noted for his busts of celebrated authors and statesmen and his bronzes with clean lines, combining the elongation of the body reminiscent of Mannerism with the colder rigor of Neoclassicism (like in his allegory of Winter), Augustin Pajou and Pierre Julien.

The latter half of the eighteenth century continued to see French preeminence in Europe, particularly through the arts and sciences, and speaking the French language was expected for members of the European courts. The French academic system continued to produce artists, but some, such as Jean-Honoré Fragonard and Jean-Baptiste-Siméon Chardin, explored new and increasingly impressionist styles of painting with thick brushwork. Although the hierarchy of genres continued to be respected officially, genre painting, landscape, portrait, and still life were extremely fashionable. Chardin and Jean-Baptiste Oudry were hailed for their still lifes although this was officially considered the lowest of all genres in the hierarchy of painting subjects.

One also finds in this period a Pre-romanticist aspect. Hubert Robert's images of ruins, inspired by Italian capriccio paintings, are typical in this respect as well as the image of storms and moonlight marines by Claude Joseph Vernet and the allegorical nudes of Pierre-Paul Prud'hon, who adopted a vaporous touch inspired by Leonardo da Vinci and Correggio, testifying to the emergence of a romantic sensibility in opposition to the rigor of the neoclassical line. So too the change from the rational and geometrical French garden of André Le Nôtre to the English garden, which emphasized artificially wild and irrational nature, like in the garden made by Richard Mique for Marie-Antoinette on the grounds of the Petit Trianon, in Versailles, which includes an artificial lake, hill and grotto. One also finds in some of these gardens—curious ruins of temples—called "follies", like the neo-antique Temple de l'Amour, also in the Petit Trianon's gardens.

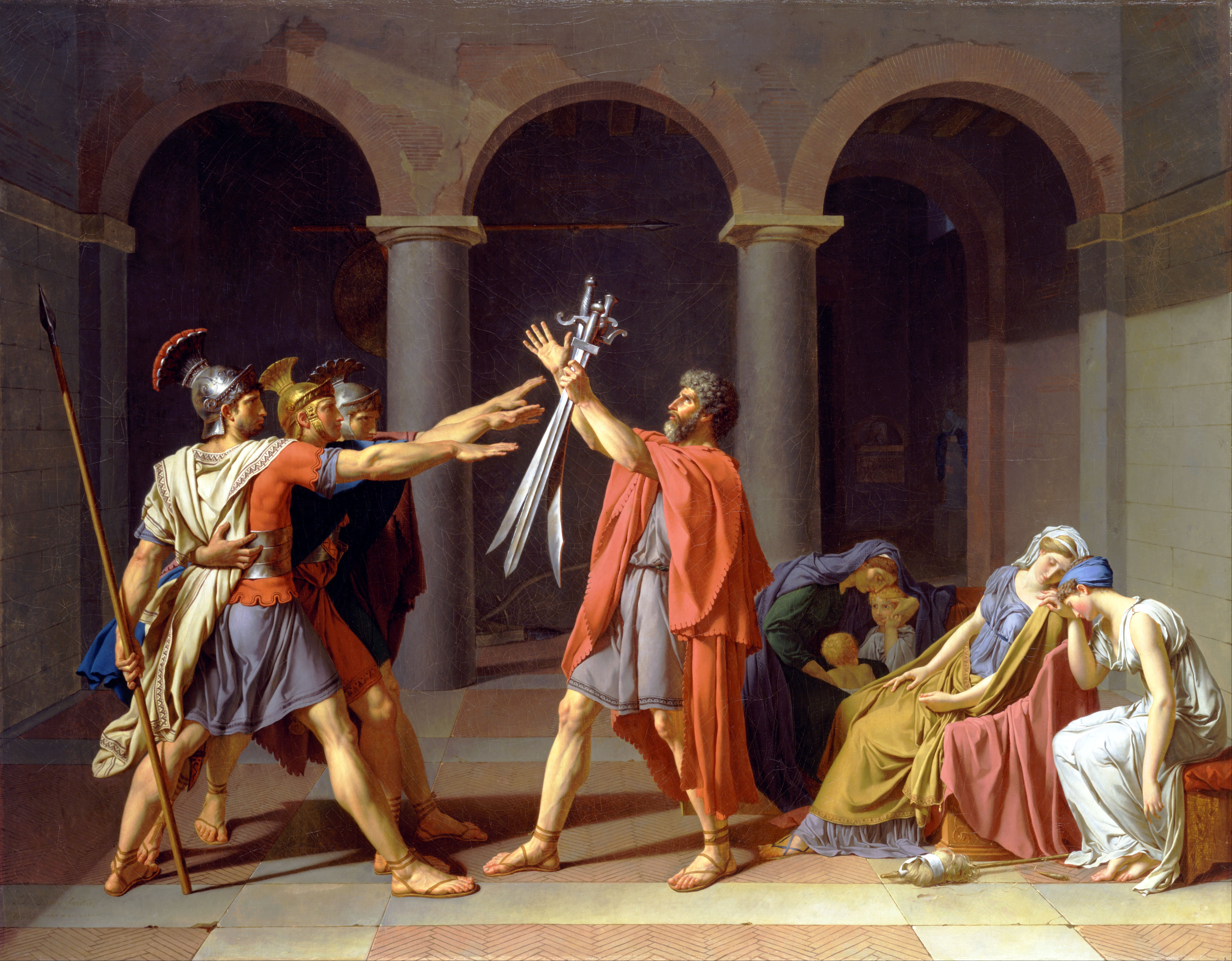
Jacques-Louis David, Oath of the Horatii, 1786

The last half of the eighteenth century saw a turn to Neoclassicism in France, that is to say a conscious use of Greek and Roman forms and iconography. This movement was promoted by intellectuals such as Diderot, in reaction to the artificiality and the decorative essence of the rocaille style. In painting, the greatest representative of this style is Jacques-Louis David, who, mirroring the profiles of Greek vases, emphasized the use of the profile. His subject matter often involved classical history such as the death of Socrates and Brutus. The dignity and subject matter of his paintings were greatly inspired by the works of Nicolas Poussin from the seventeenth century. Poussin and David were in turn major influences on Jean Auguste Dominique Ingres, who started his career in the very last year of the century. Other important neoclassical painters of the period are Jean-Baptiste Greuze, celebrated for his moralizing genre painting, Joseph-Marie Vien and, in the portrait genre, Élisabeth Louise Vigée Le Brun, who was a favorite of Marie-Antoinette. Louis-Léopold Boilly became active at the end of 1770s and painted genre paintings documenting French middle-class social life and the French Revolution, small portraits and trompe-l'oeil in a style of great precision and meticulousness. Neoclassicism also penetrated decorative arts and architecture.

Architects such as Ledoux and Boullée developed a radical style of neoclassical architecture based on simple and pure geometrical forms with a research of symmetry and harmony, elaborating visionary projects, for example the complex of the Saltworks of Arc-et-Senans by Ledoux, a model of an ideal factory developed from the rational concepts of the Enlightenment thinkers.

1750-1800 French art

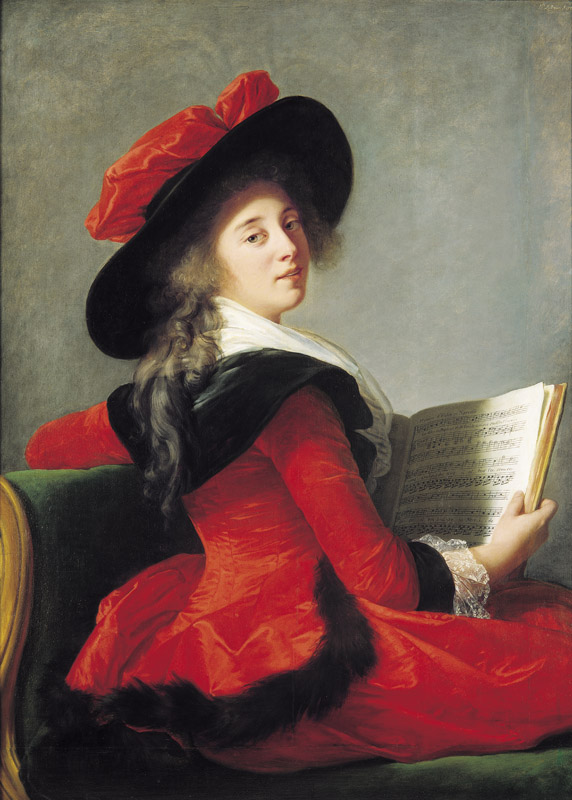
Élisabeth Vigée Le Brun, The Baronne de Crussol, 1785.

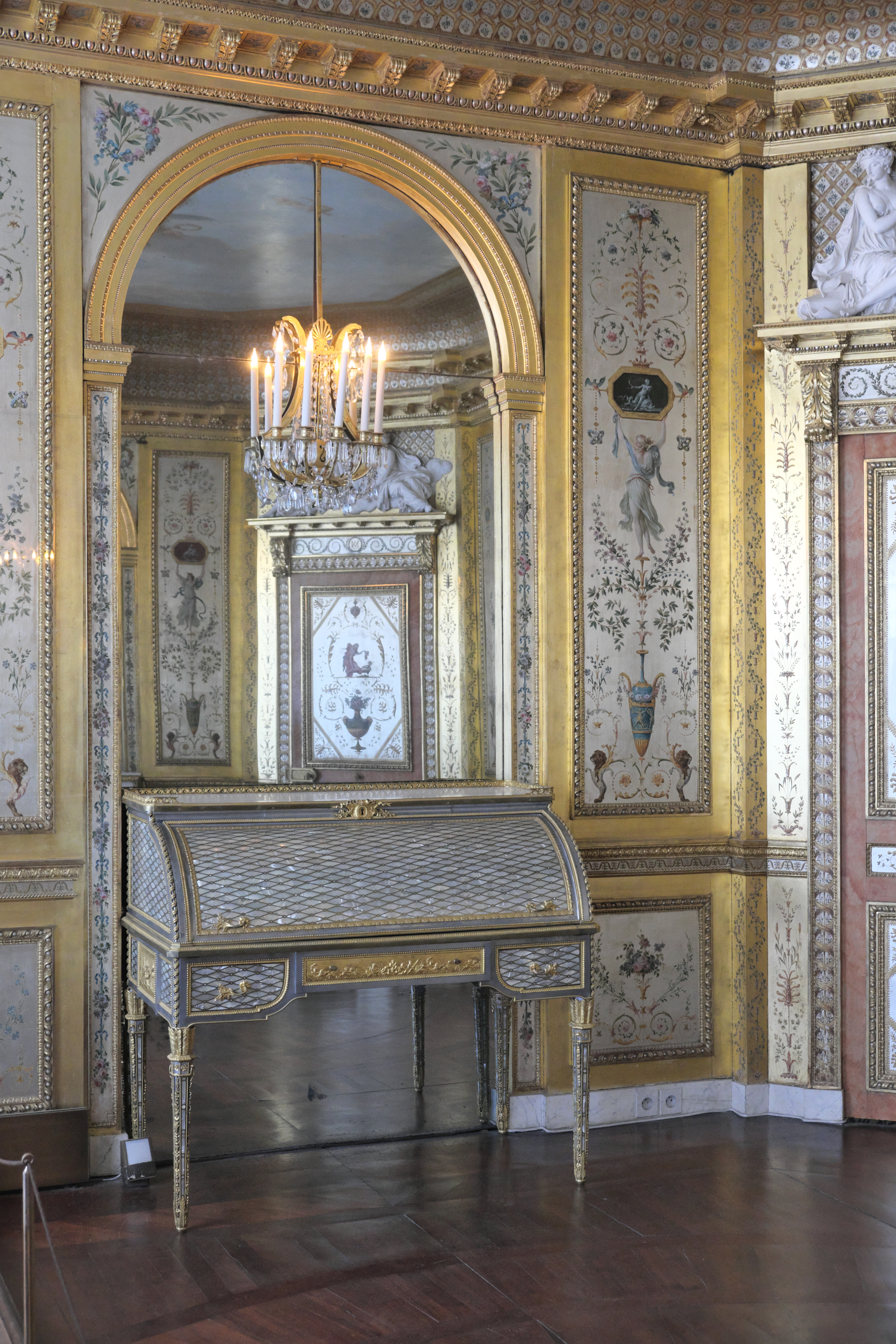
The Boudoir de la Reine by Pierre Rousseau with Riesener's Cylinder Secretary of Marie-Antoinette, Palace of Fontainebleau, 1786.

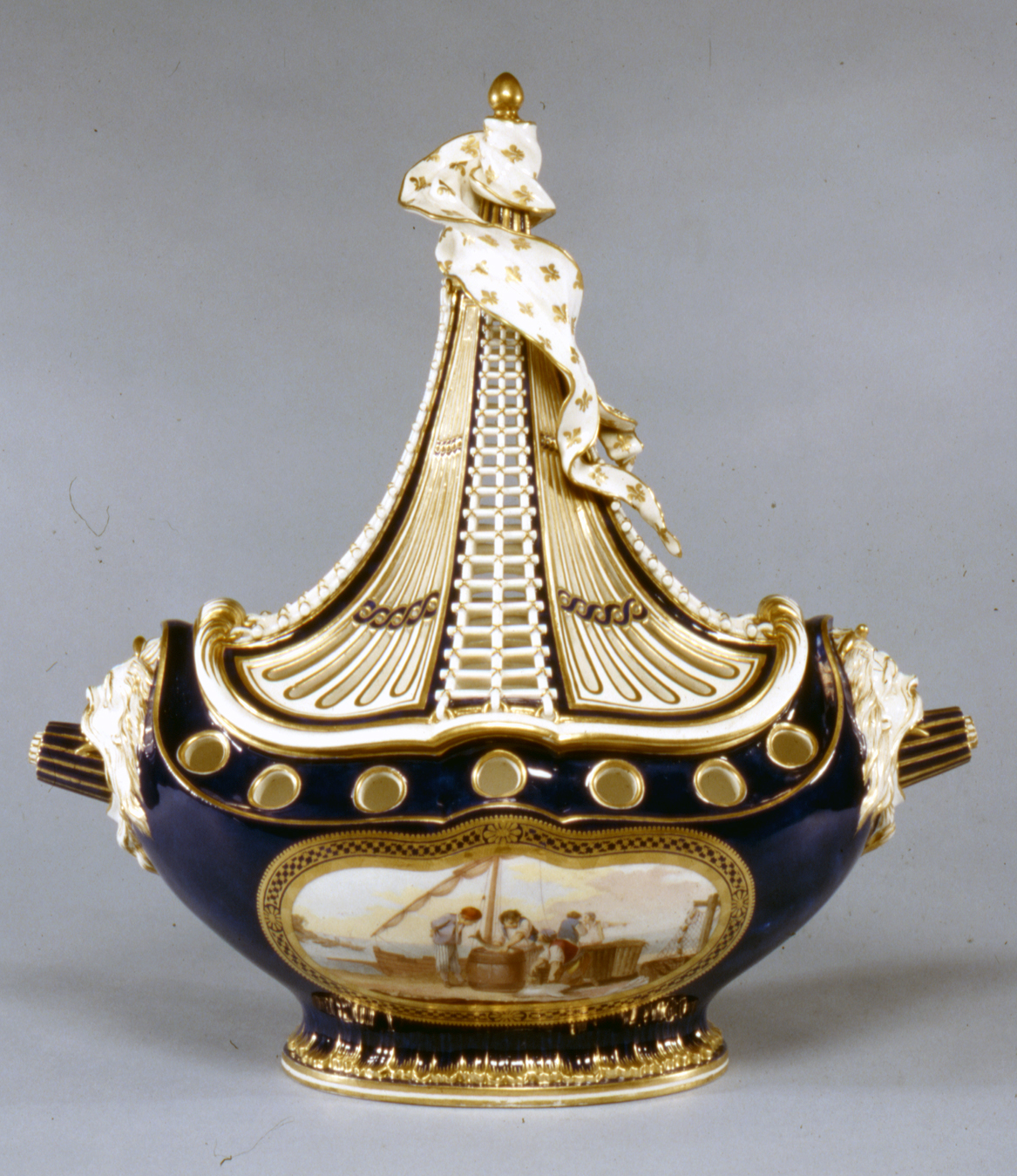
Sèvres Porcelain Manufactory, Pot-pourri vase in the shape of a ship (Vase potpourri à vaisseau), 1764.

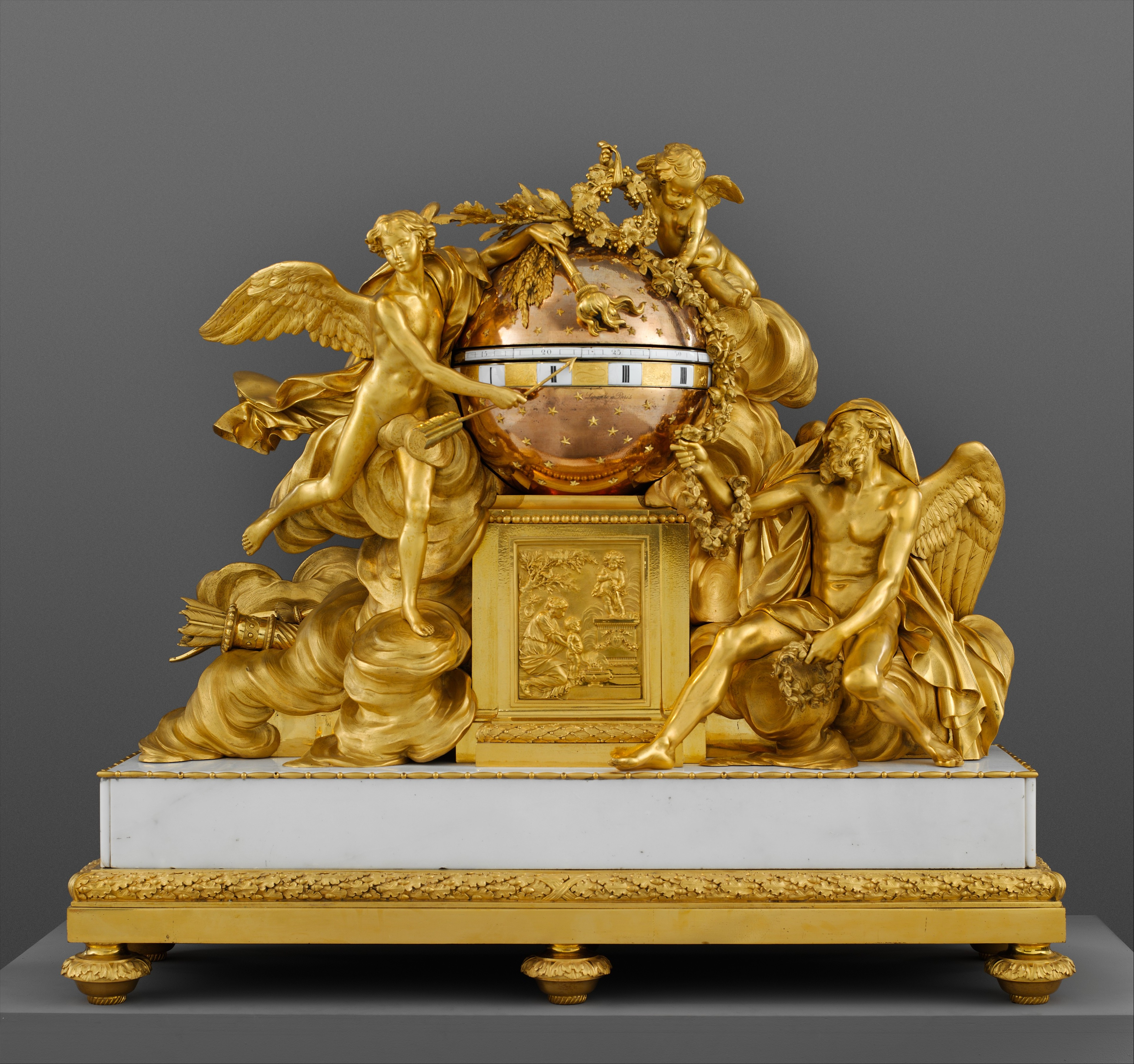
Augustin Pajou, Jean-Baptiste Lepaute and Étienne Martincourt, Mantel clock, 1780-1790.

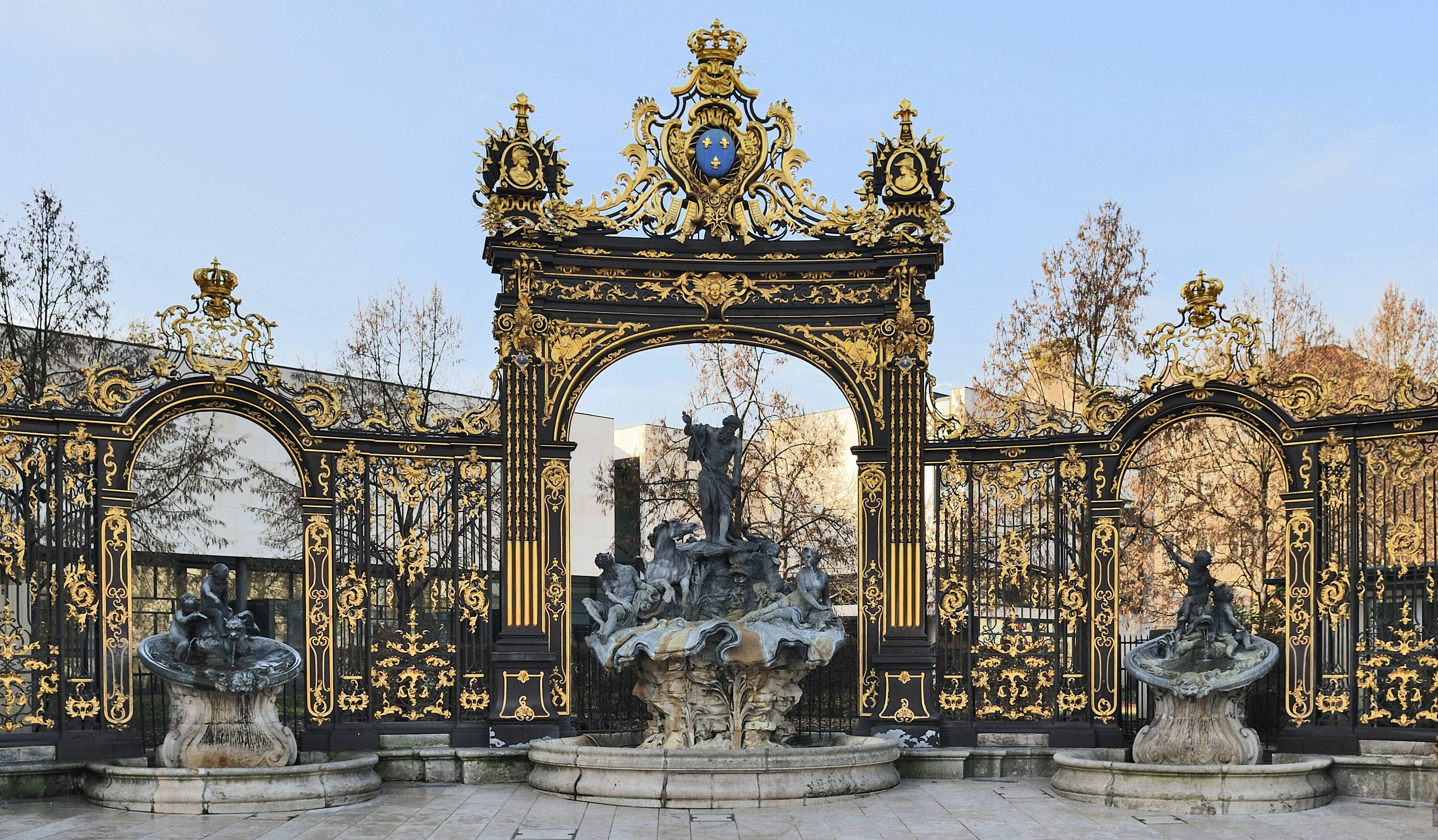
Neptune Fountain by Barthélemy Guibal with ironwork by Jean Lamour, Place Stanislas, Nancy, 1751-1755.

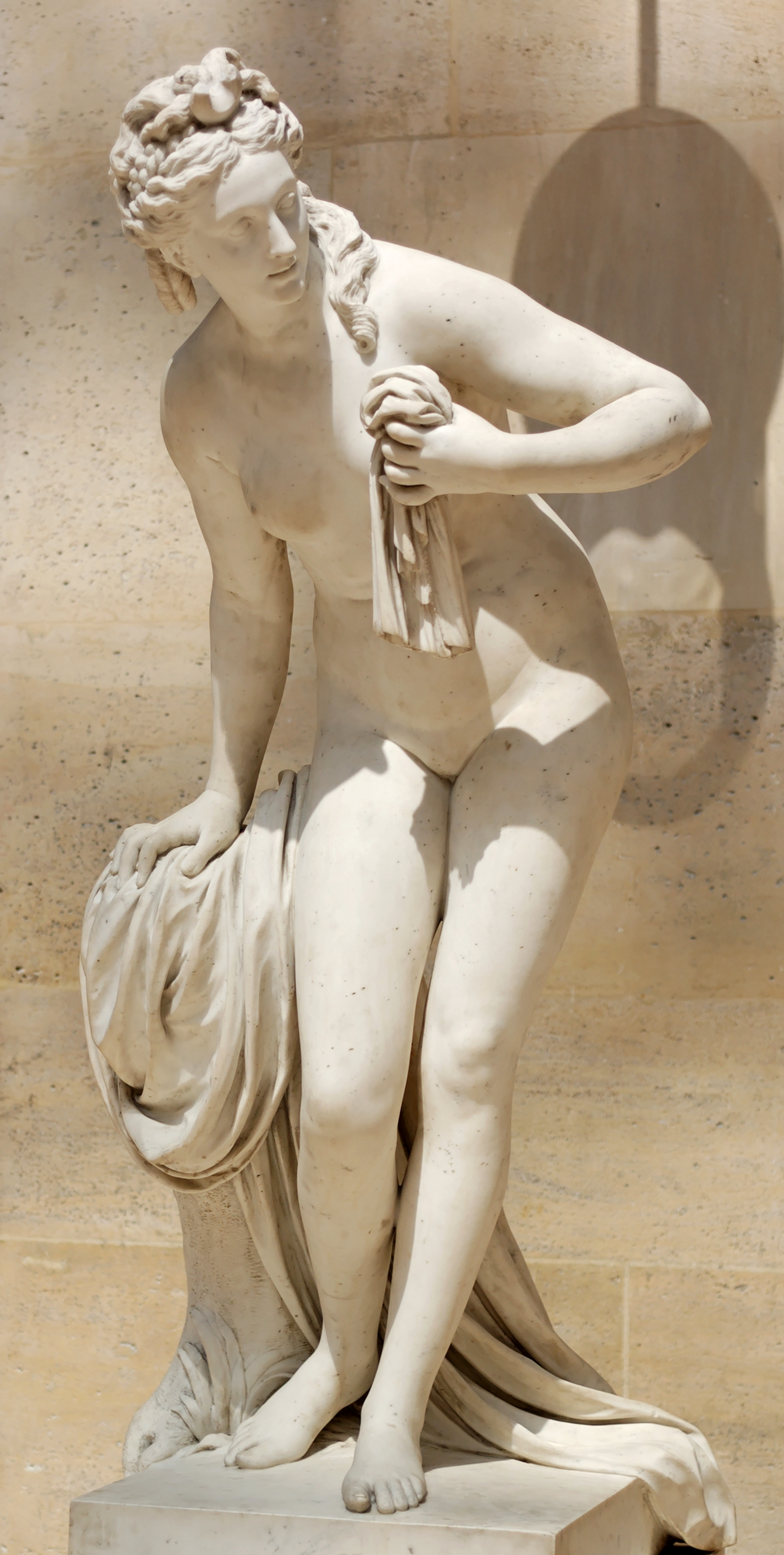
Christophe-Gabriel Allegrain , Diana, 1777-1778.

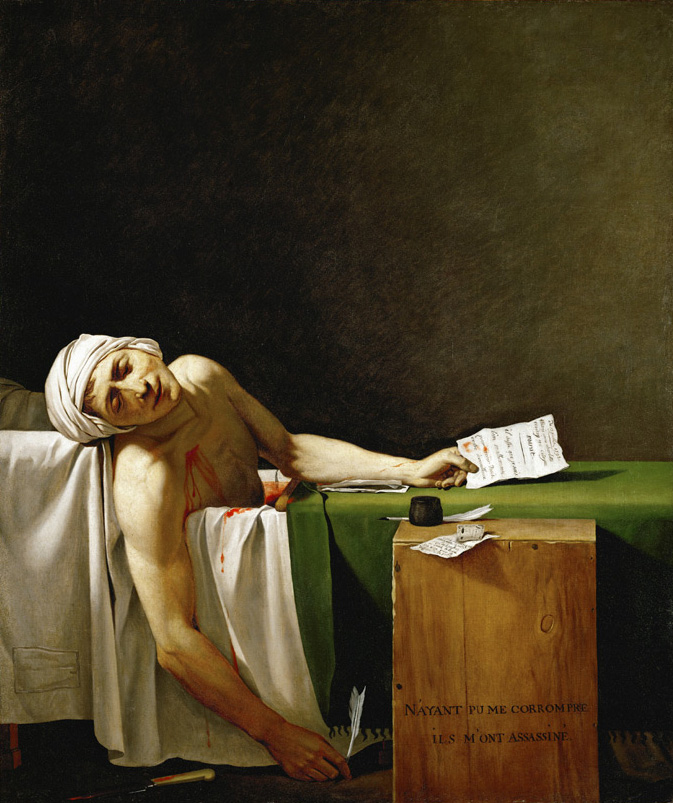
Jacques-Louis David, The Death of Marat, 1793.

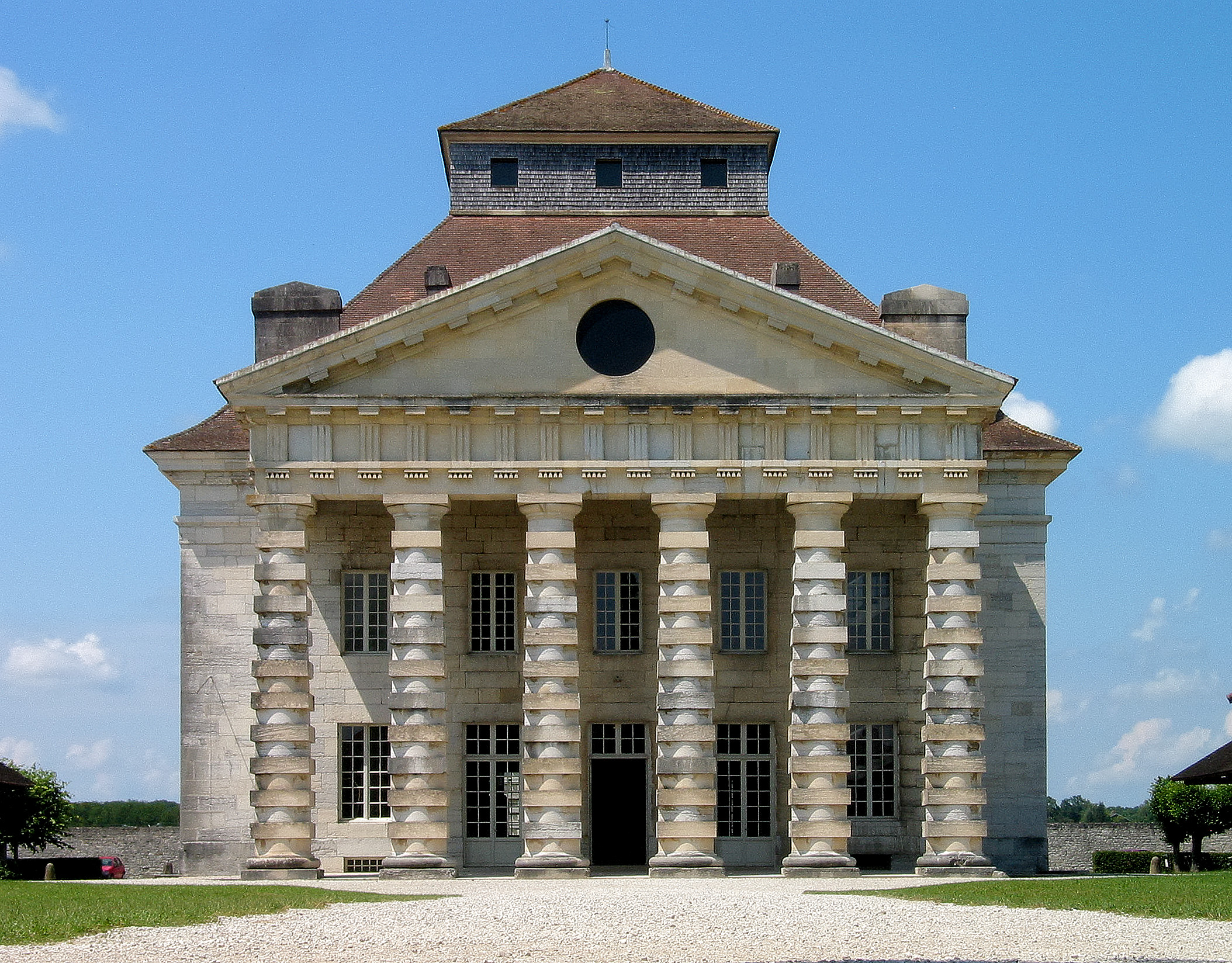
Director's house at the Royal Saltworks at Arc-et-Senans by Claude Nicolas Ledoux (1775–79).

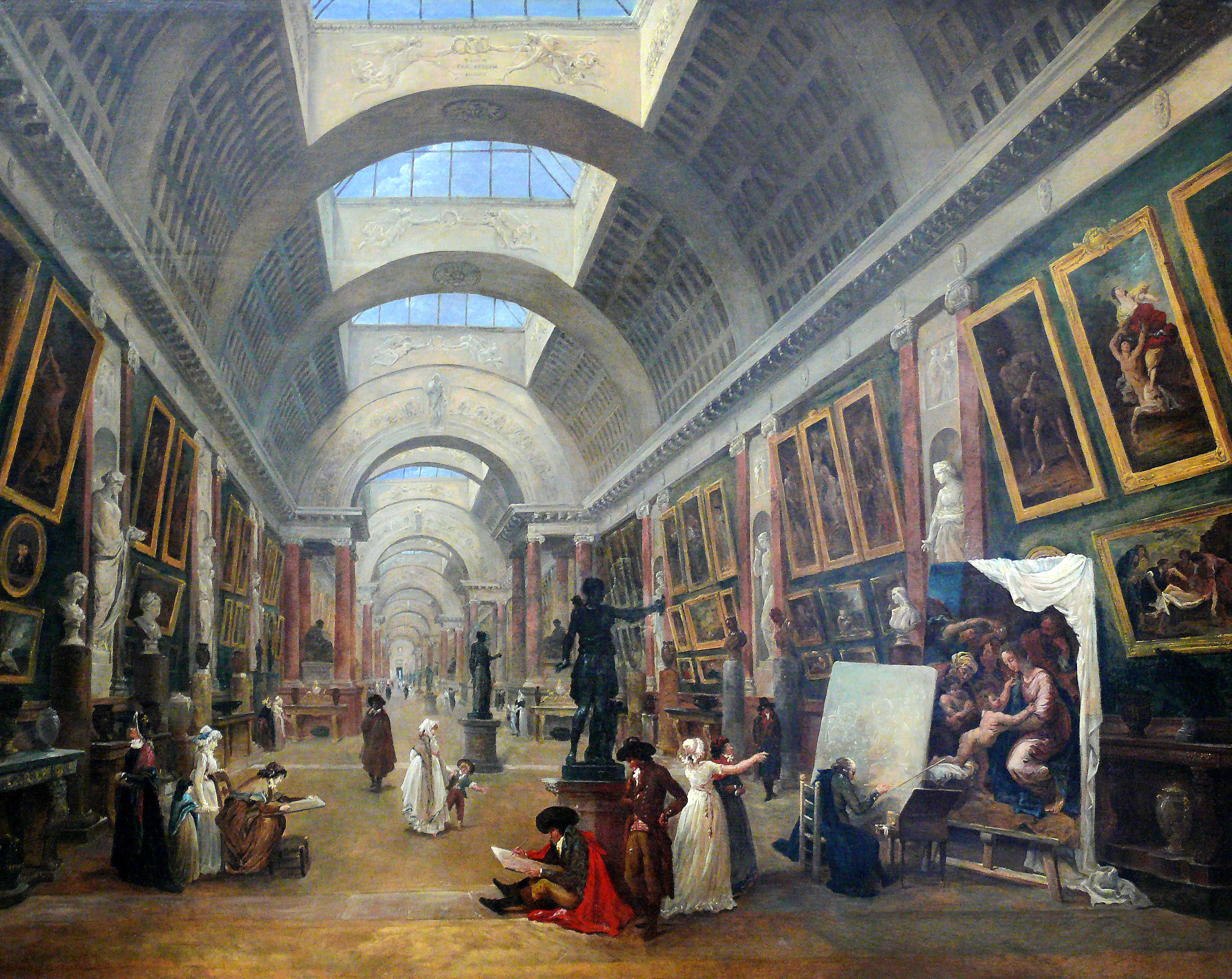
Hubert Robert, Project for the Transformation of the Grande Galerie du Louvre, 1796.

=== Modern period ===
==== 19th century ====
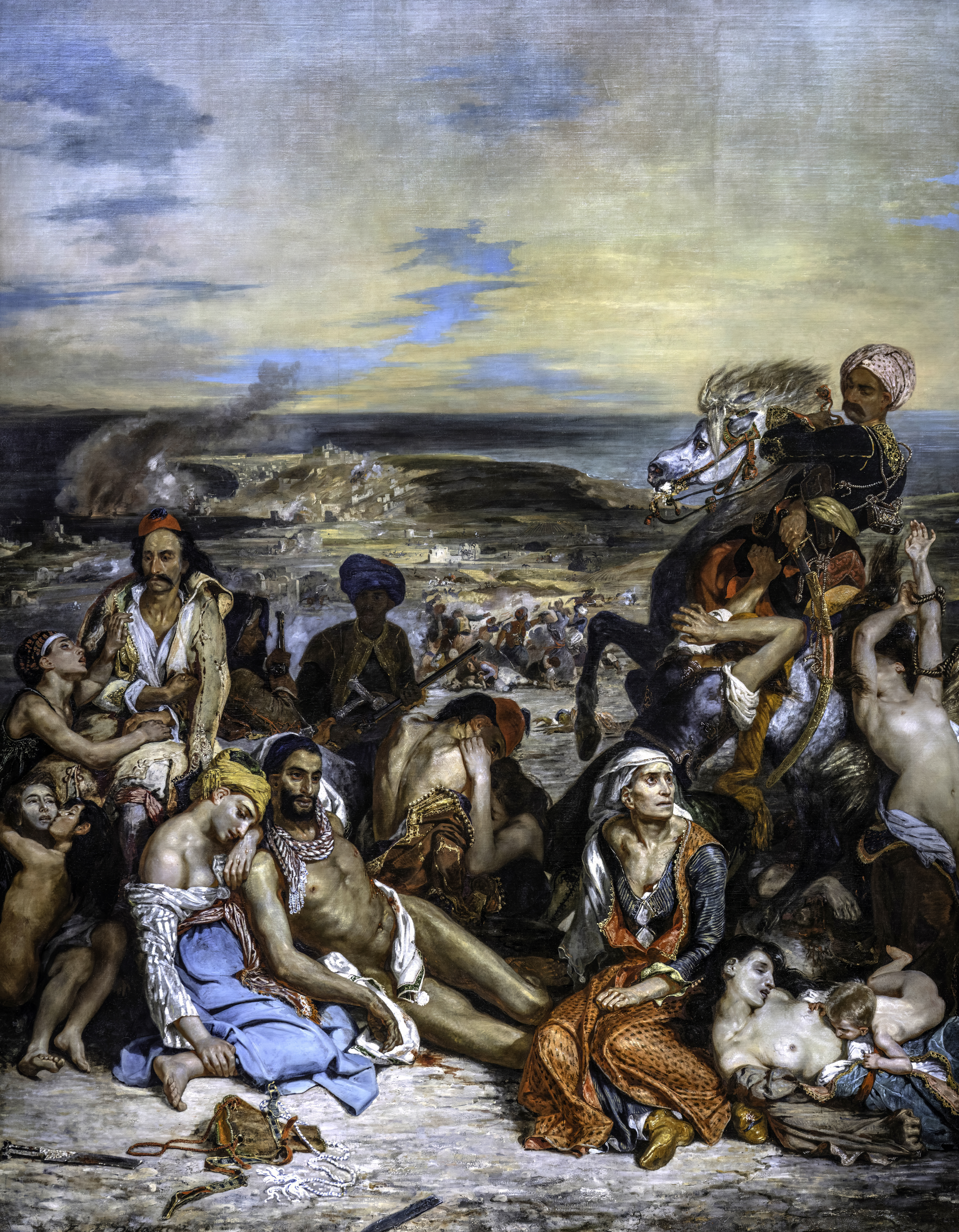
The Massacre at Chios, Eugène Delacroix, 1824

The French Revolution and the Napoleonic Wars brought great changes to the arts in France. The program of exaltation and myth making attendant to the Emperor Napoleon was closely coordinated in the paintings of David, Gros and Guérin. In architecture and decorative arts, the Empire style was created for imperial residences by architects Pierre Fontaine and Charles Percier, drawing heavily on references to Roman and Egyptian Antiquity. Cabinet-maker Jacob Desmalter created original furniture in the Empire style, mainly employing mahogany veneers with heavy gilt-bronze mounts. Seats, made in mahogany when they were not painted or gilded, were inspired from seats and thrones designs of Antiquity, derived from details on ancient reliefs and Greek vases. Jean-Auguste-Dominique Ingres was the main figure of neoclassicism in painting until the 1850s and a prominent teacher, giving priority to drawing over color. Meanwhile, Orientalism, Egyptian motifs, the tragic anti-hero, the wild landscape, the historical novel, and scenes from the Middle Ages and the Renaissance—all these elements of Romanticism—created a vibrant period that defies easy classification. The most important romantic painter of the period was Eugène Delacroix, who had a successful public career and was the main opponent of Ingres. Before him, Théodore Géricault opened the path to romanticism with his monumental Raft of the Medusa exposed at the Salon of 1819. Camille Corot tried to escape the conventional and idealized form of landscape painting influenced by classicism to be more realist and sensible to atmospheric variations at the same time.

Romantic tendencies continued throughout the century, both idealized landscape painting and Realism have their seeds in Romanticism. The work of Gustave Courbet and the Barbizon school are logical developments from it, as is the late nineteenth century Symbolism of such painters as Gustave Moreau, the professor of Henri Matisse and Georges Rouault, as well as Odilon Redon.

Academic painting developed at the Ecole des Beaux-Arts was the most successful with the public and the state: highly trained painters such as Jean-Léon Gérôme, William Bouguereau and Alexandre Cabanel painted historical scenes inspired by the antique, following the footsteps of Ingres and the neoclassical artists. Though criticized for their conventionalism by the young avant-garde painters and critics, the most talented of the Academic painters renewed the historical genre, drawing inspiration from multiple cultures and techniques such as the Orient, and the new framings made possible by the invention of photography

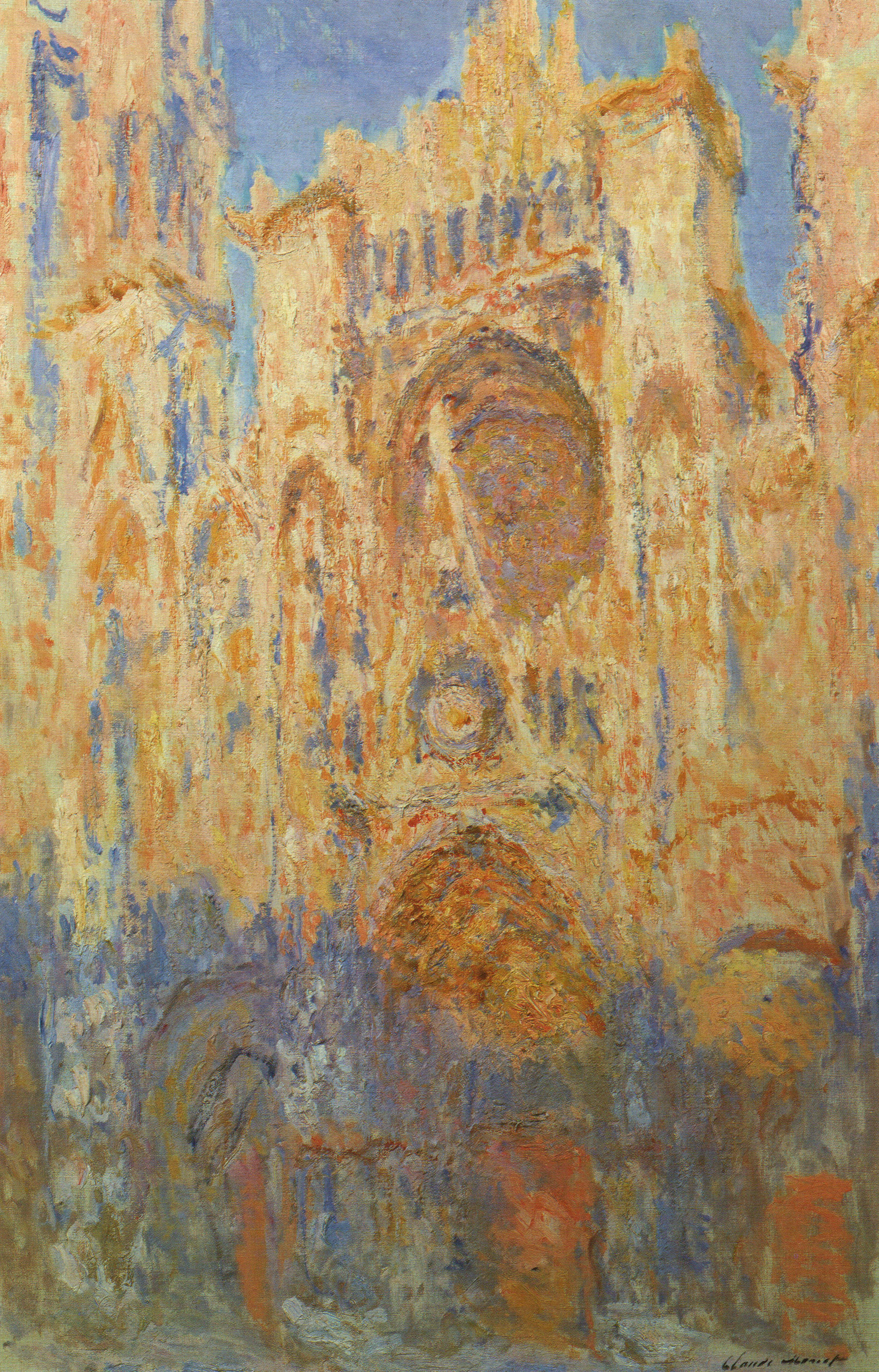
Claude Monet, Rouen Cathedral, Facade (Sunset), c. 1892-1894

For many critics who wrote about the nineteenth century and the idea of modernity, Édouard Manet is the main figure leading to the rise of an avant-garde movement as opposed to Academism and official painting (as much as Charles Baudelaire is for poetry at the same time). His rediscovery of Spanish painting from the Golden age, his willingness to show the unpainted canvas, his exploration of the forthright nude, and his radical brush strokes are the first steps toward Impressionism. Impressionism would take the Barbizon school one step farther, rejecting once and for all a belabored style and the use of mixed colors and black, for fragile transitive effects of light as captured outdoors in changing light (partly inspired by the paintings of J. M. W. Turner and Eugène Boudin). It led to Claude Monet with his cathedrals and haystacks, Pierre-Auguste Renoir with both his early outdoor festivals and his later feathery style of ruddy nudes, and Edgar Degas with his dancers and bathers. Other important impressionists were Frédéric Bazille, Alfred Sisley, Camille Pissarro and Gustave Caillebotte.

After that threshold was crossed, the next thirty years became a litany of amazing experiments. Vincent van Gogh, Dutch born, but living in France, opened the road to expressionism. Georges Seurat, influenced by color theory, devised a pointillist technique that governed the Impressionist experiment and was followed by Paul Signac. Paul Cézanne, a painter's painter, attempted a geometrical exploration of the world, that left many of his peers indifferent. Paul Gauguin, a banker, found symbolism in Brittany along with Émile Bernard, and then exoticism and primitivism in French Polynesia. These painters were referred to as Post-Impressionists. Les Nabis, a movement of the 1890s, including painters such as Paul Sérusier, Pierre Bonnard, Édouard Vuillard and Maurice Denis, was influenced by Gauguin's example in Brittany: they explored a decorative art in flat plains with the graphic approach of a Japanese print. They preached that a work of art is the end product and the visual expression of an artist's synthesis of nature in personal aesthetic metaphors and symbols. Henri Rousseau, the self-taught dabbling postmaster, became the model for the naïve revolution.

19th-century French painting

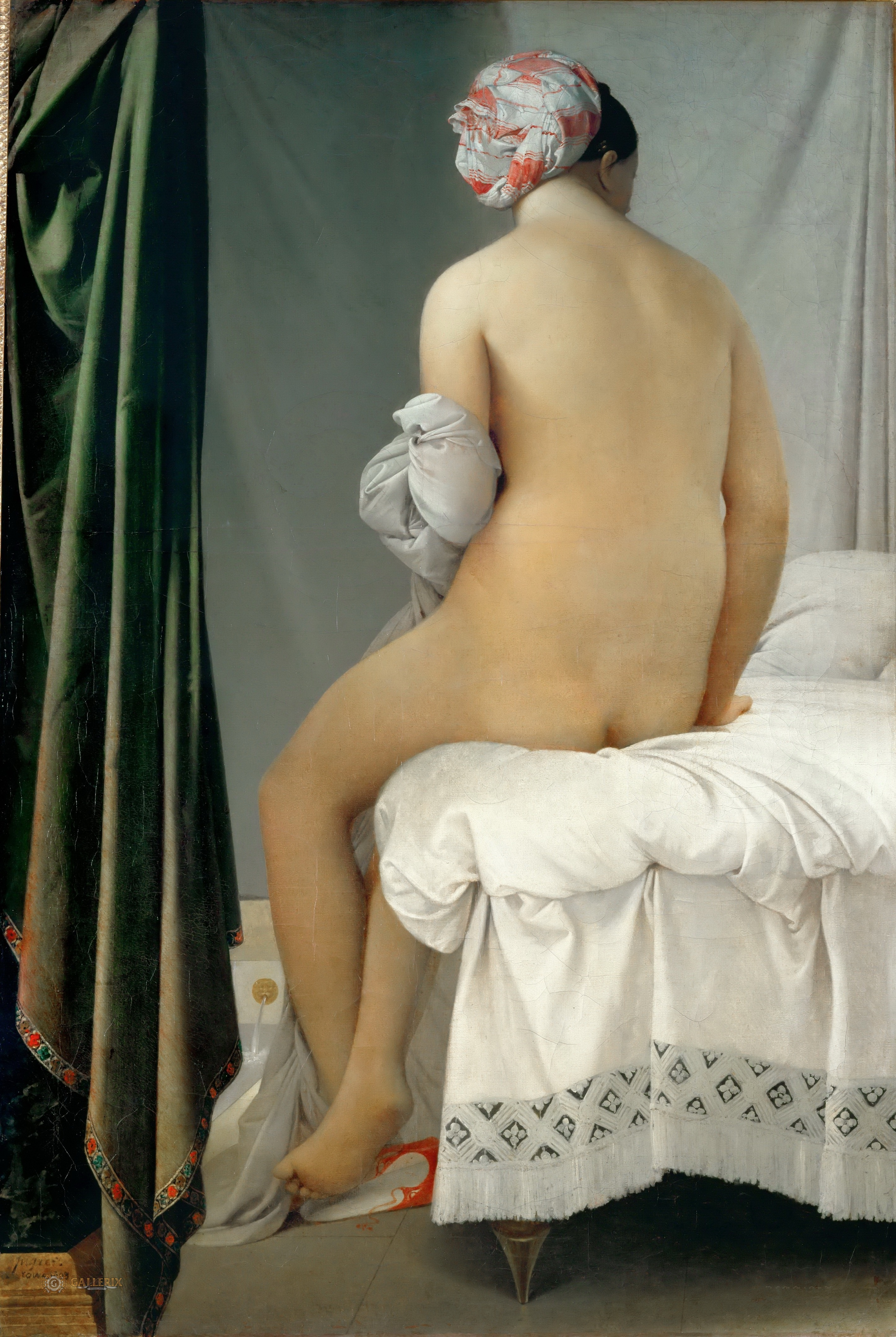
Jean-Auguste-Dominique Ingres, The Valpinçon Bather, 1808.

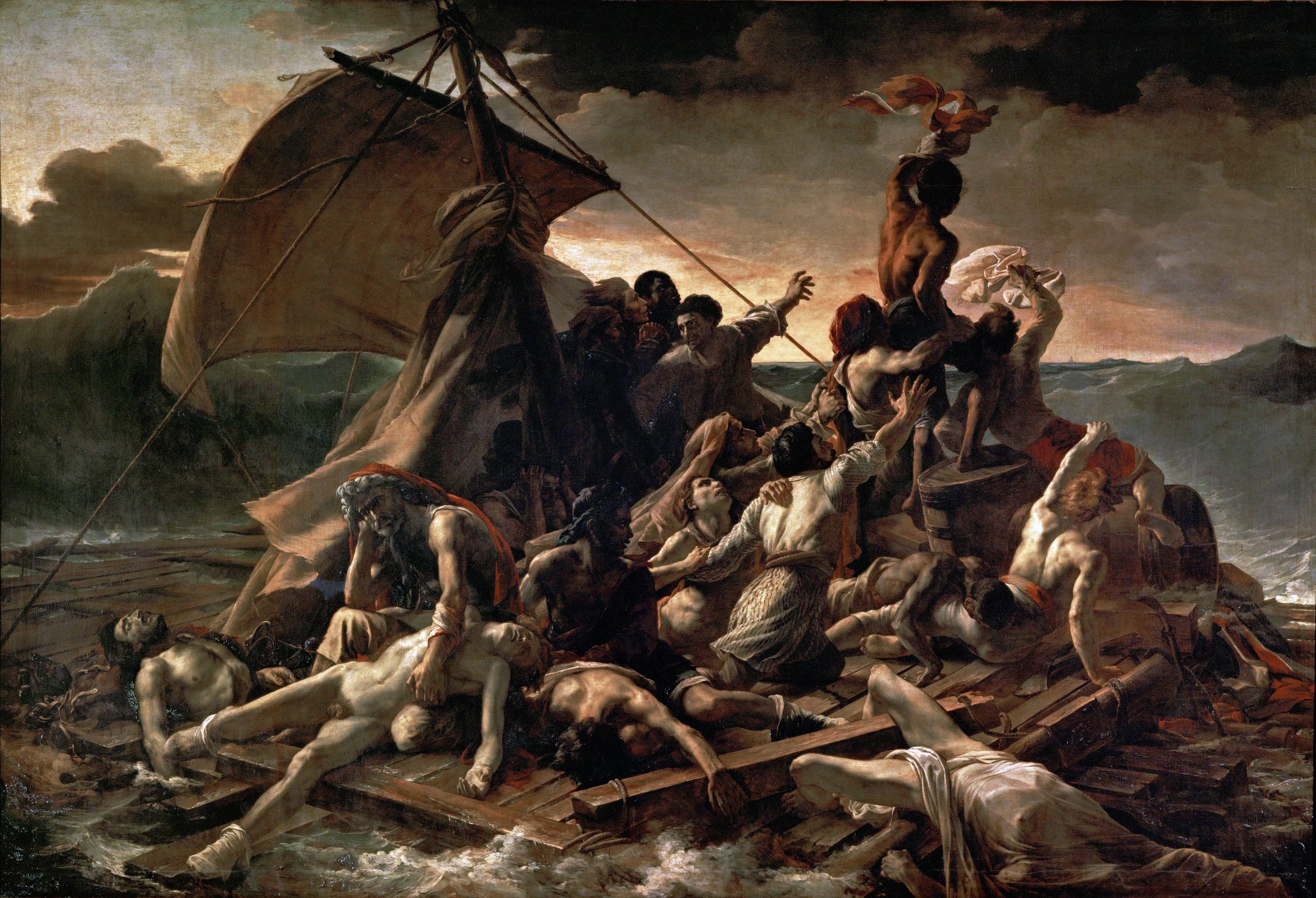
Théodore Géricault, The Raft of the Medusa, 1818-1819.

Eugène Delacroix, Liberty Leading the People, 1830.

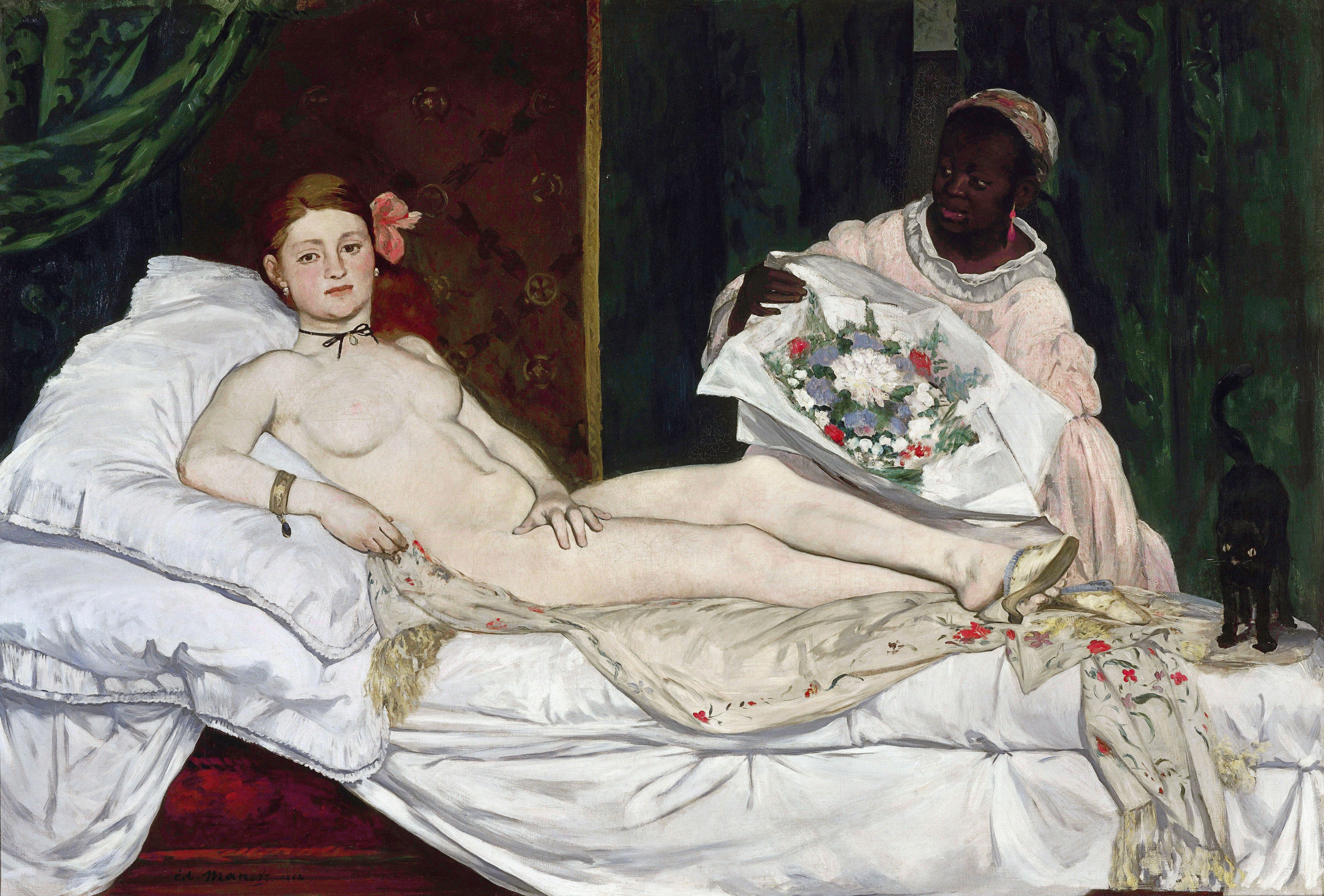
Édouard Manet, Olympia, 1863.

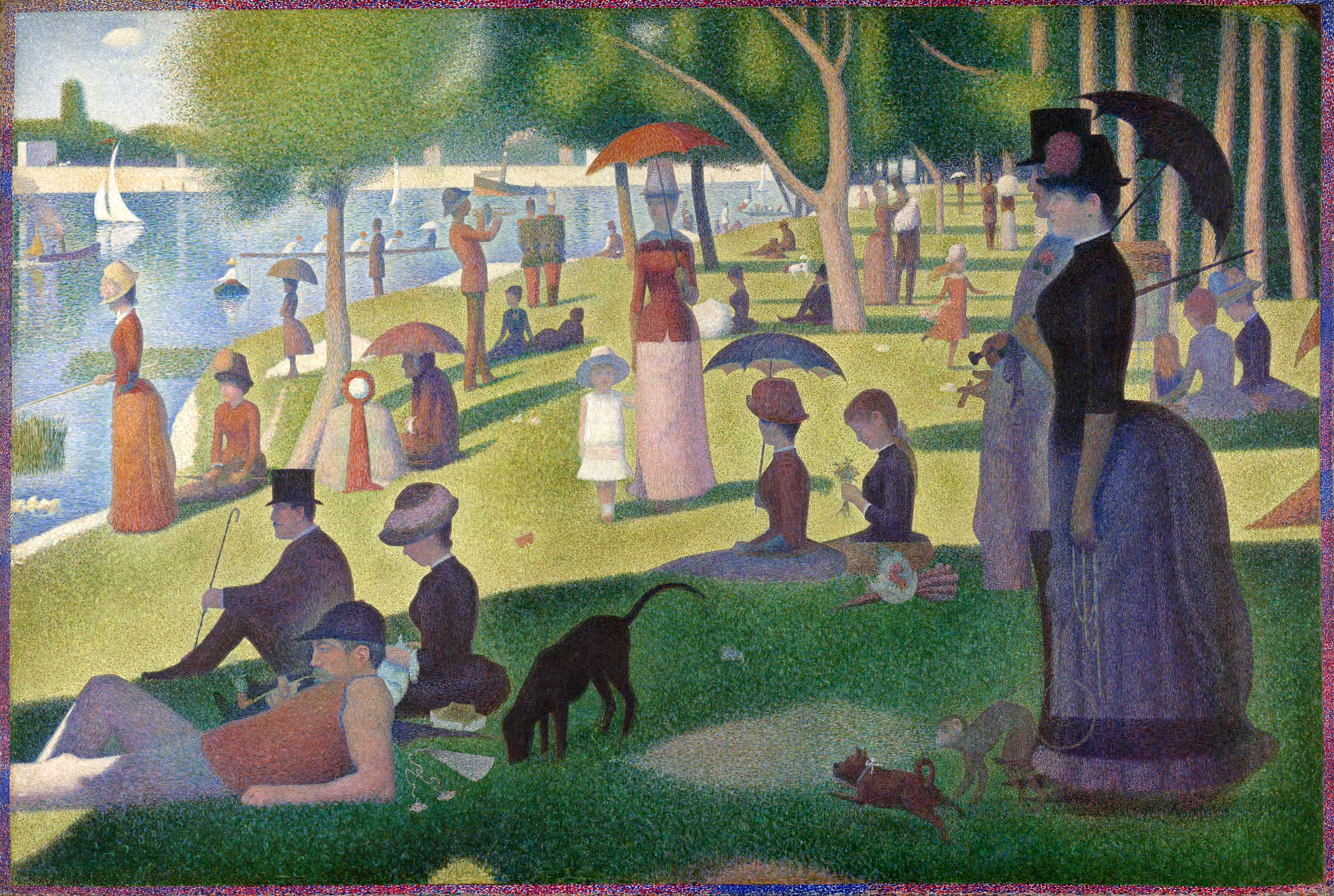
Georges Seurat, A Sunday Afternoon on the Island of La Grande Jatte, 1884-1886.

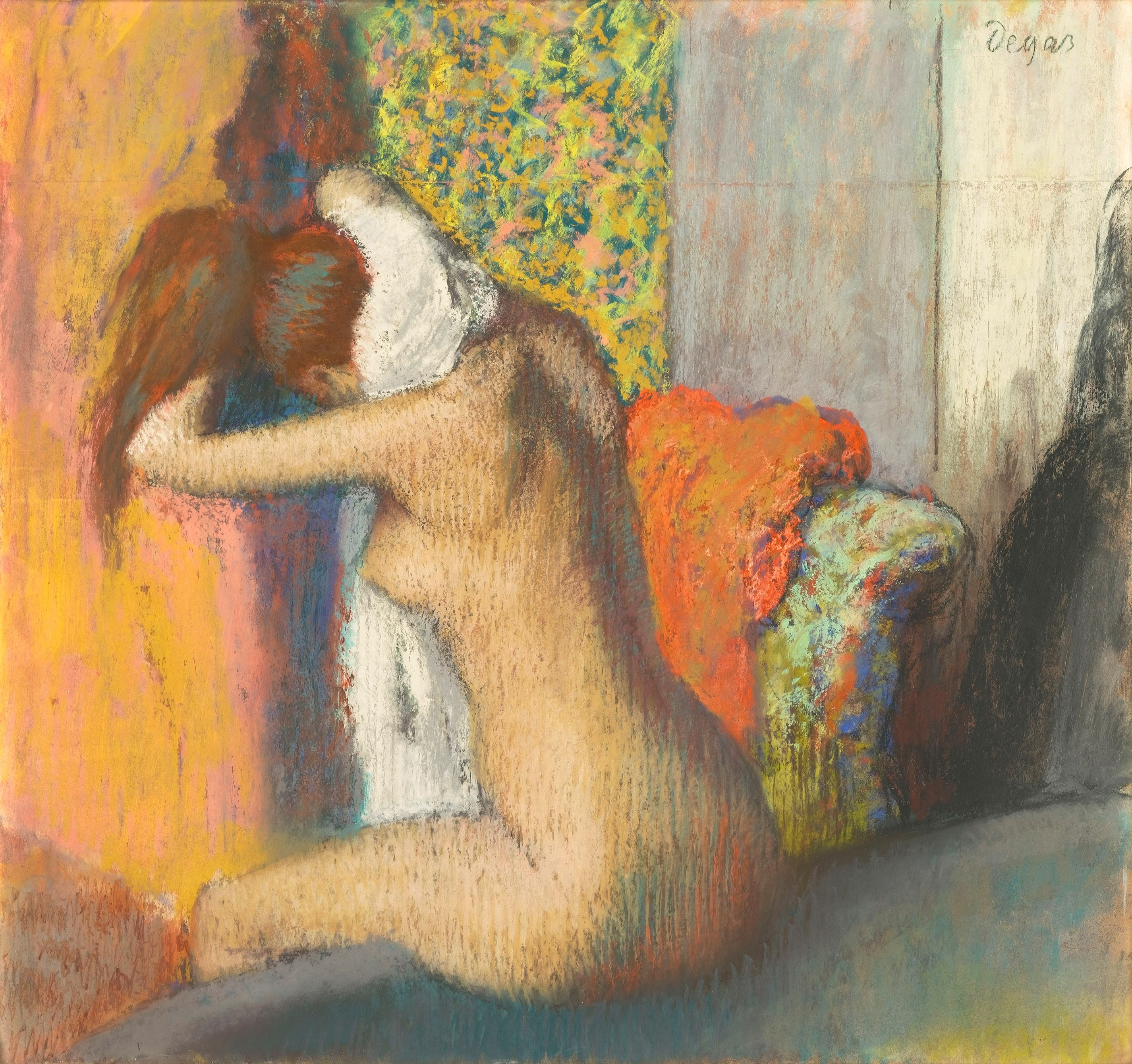
Edgar Degas, After the Bath, Woman Drying her Neck , 1895-1898.

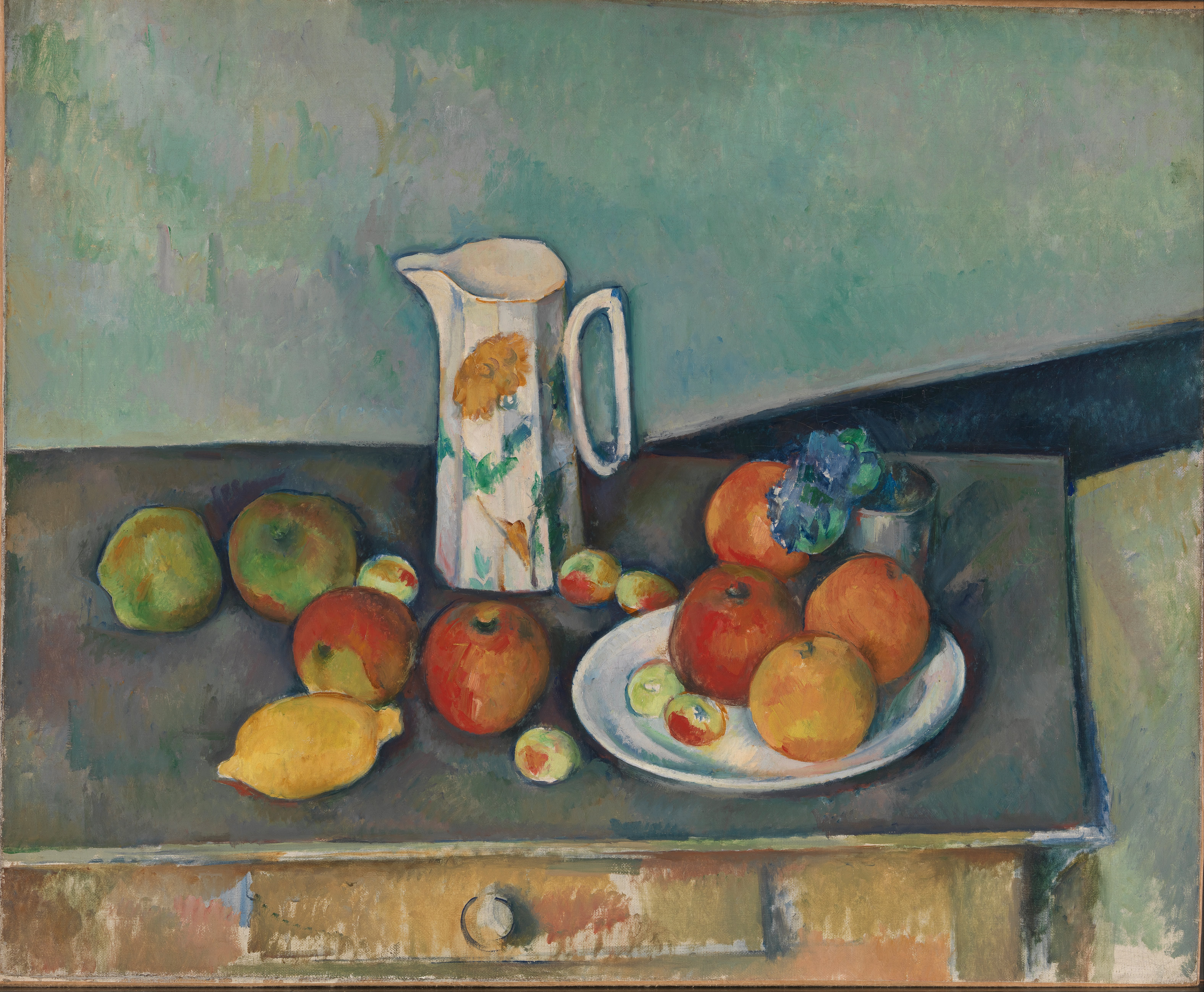
Paul Cézanne, Still Life with Milk Jug and Fruit, c. 1890.

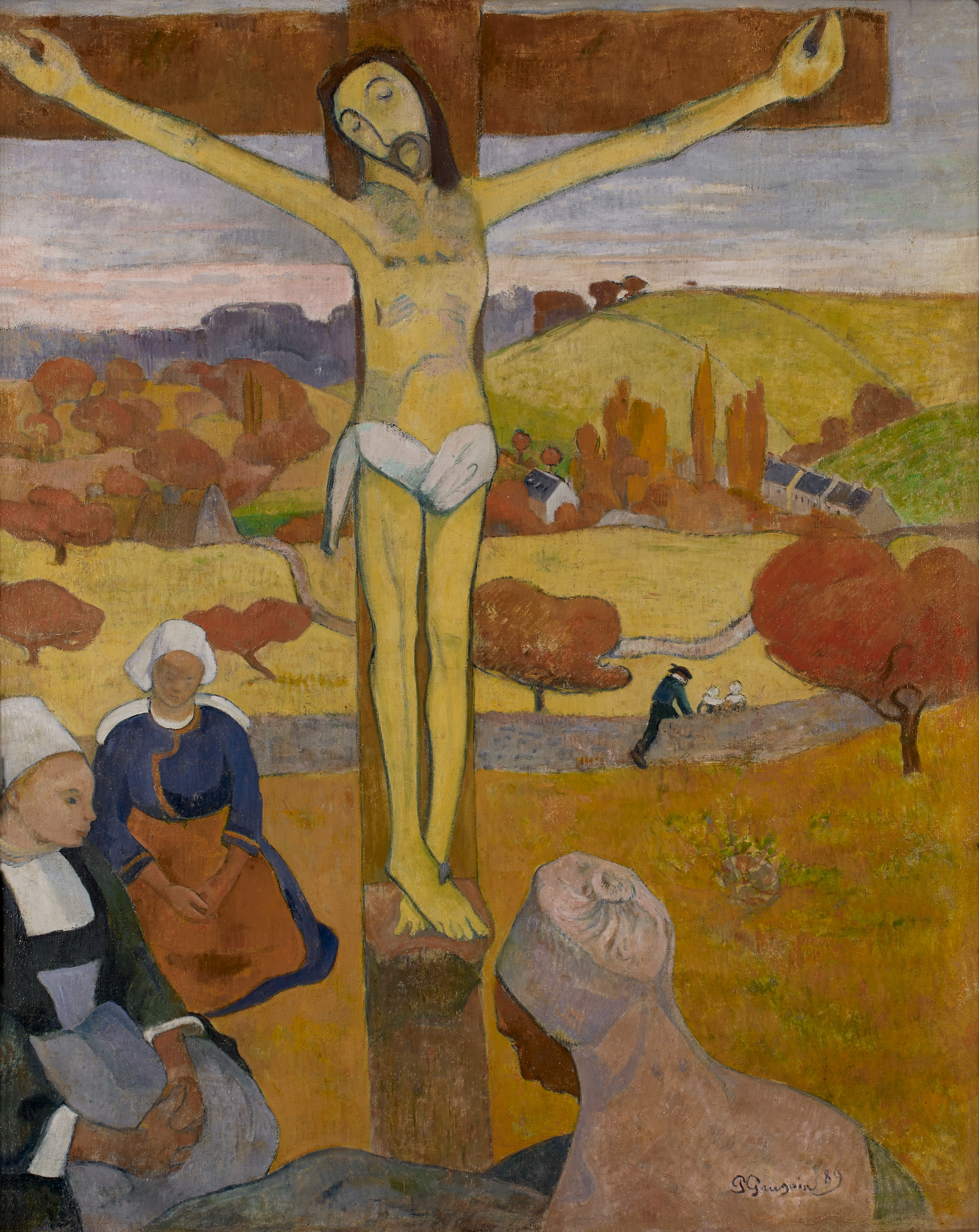
Paul Gauguin, The Yellow Christ, 1889.

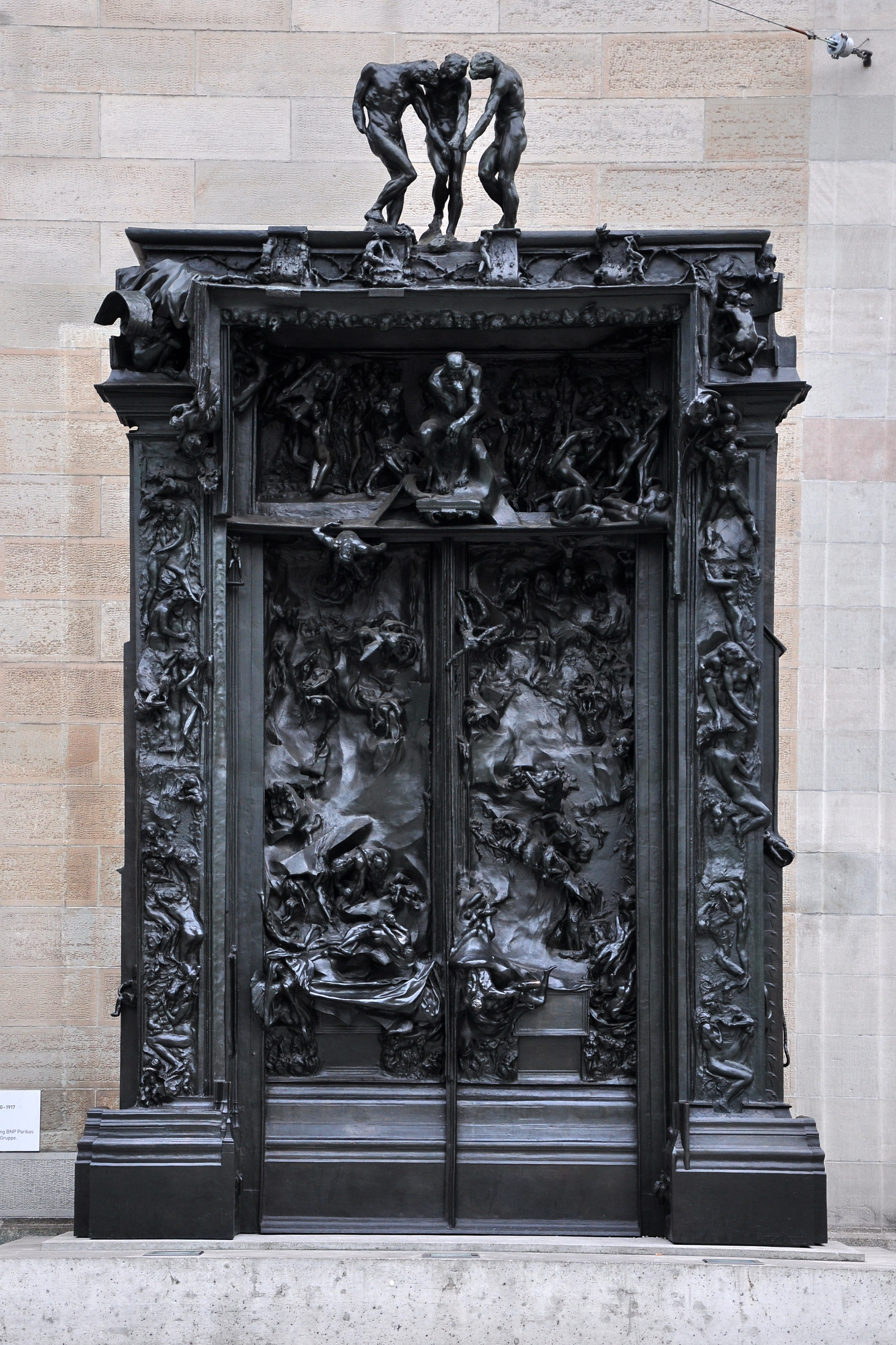
Auguste Rodin, The Gates of Hell, 1880-1917.

==== 20th century ====
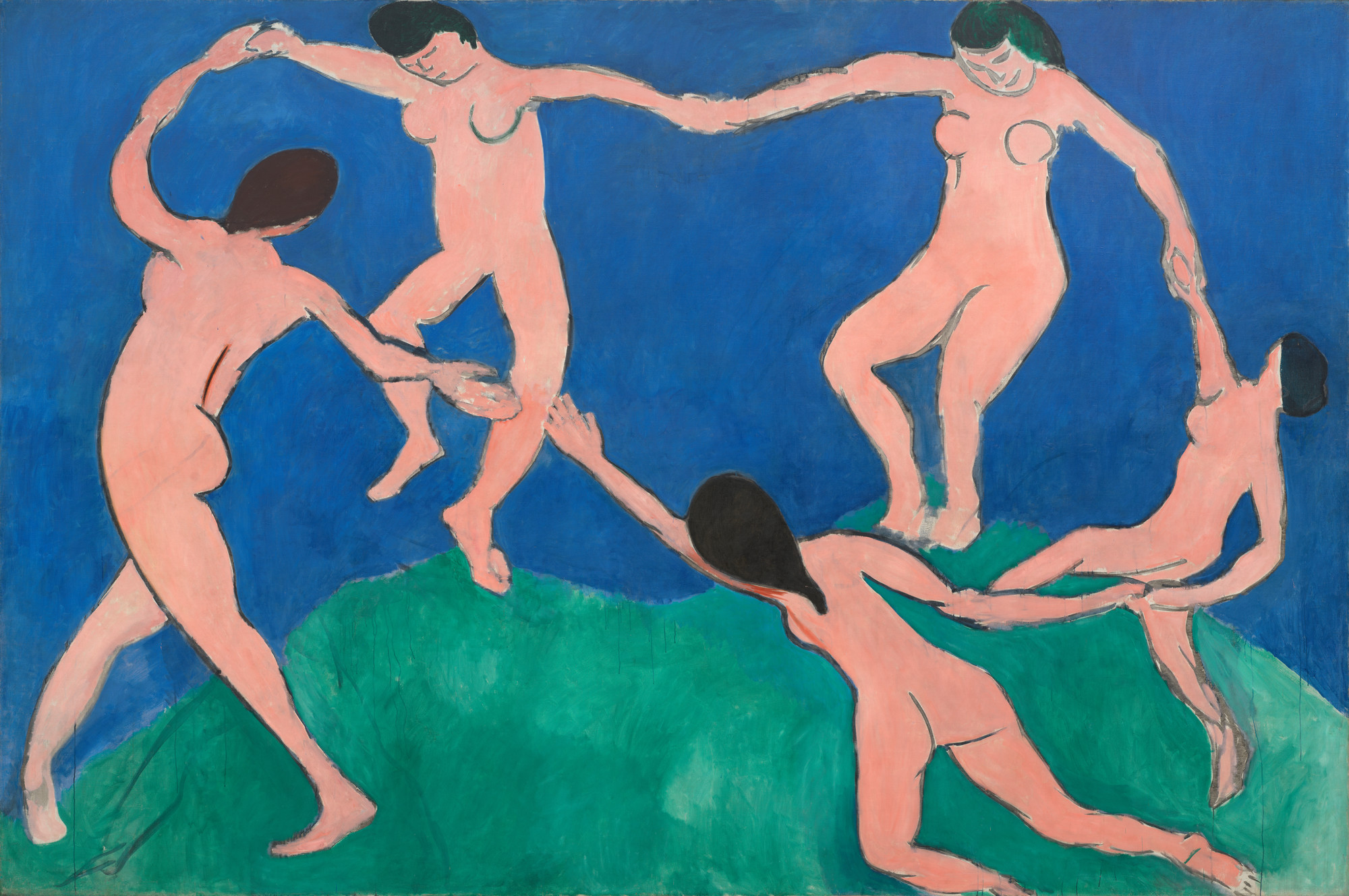
Henri Matisse, Dance (I), 1909.

The early years of the twentieth century were dominated by experiments in colour and content that Impressionism and Post-Impressionism had unleashed. The products of the far east also brought new influences. At roughly the same time, Les Fauves (Henri Matisse, André Derain, Maurice de Vlaminck, Albert Marquet, Raoul Dufy, Othon Friesz, Charles Camoin, Henri Manguin) exploded into color, much like German Expressionism.

The discovery of African tribal masks by Pablo Picasso, a Spaniard living in Paris, lead him to create his Les Demoiselles d'Avignon of 1907. Working independently, Picasso and Georges Braque returned to and refined Cézanne's way of rationally comprehension of objects in a flat medium, their experiments in cubism also would lead them to integrate all aspects and objects of day-to-day life, collage of newspapers, musical instruments, cigarettes, wine, and other objects into their works. Cubism in all its phases would dominate paintings of Europe and America for the next ten years. (See the article on Cubism for a complete discussion.)

World War I did not stop the dynamic creation of art in France. In 1916 a group of discontents met in a bar in Zurich, the Cabaret Voltaire, and created the most radical gesture possible, the anti-art of Dada. At the same time, Francis Picabia and Marcel Duchamp were exploring similar notions. At a 1917 art show in New York, Duchamp presented a white porcelain urinal (Fountain) signed R. Mutt as work of art, becoming the father of the readymade.

Georges Braque, Violin and Candlestick, 1910

When Dada reached Paris, it was avidly embraced by a group of young artists and writers who were fascinated with the writings of Sigmund Freud, particularly by his notion of the unconscious mind. The provocative spirit of Dada became linked to the exploration of the unconscious mind through the use of automatic writing, chance operations, and, in some cases, altered states. The surrealists quickly turned to painting and sculpture. The shock of unexpected elements, the use of Frottage, collage, and decalcomania, the rendering of mysterious landscapes and dreamed images were to become the key techniques through the rest of the 1930s.

Immediately after this war the French art scene diverged roughly in two directions. There were those who continued in the artistic experiments from before the war, especially surrealism, and others who adopted the new Abstract Expressionism and action painting from New York, executing them in a French manner using Tachism or L'art informel. Parallel to both of these tendencies, Jean Dubuffet dominated the early post-war years while exploring childlike drawings, graffiti, and cartoons in a variety of media.

===== École de Paris =====
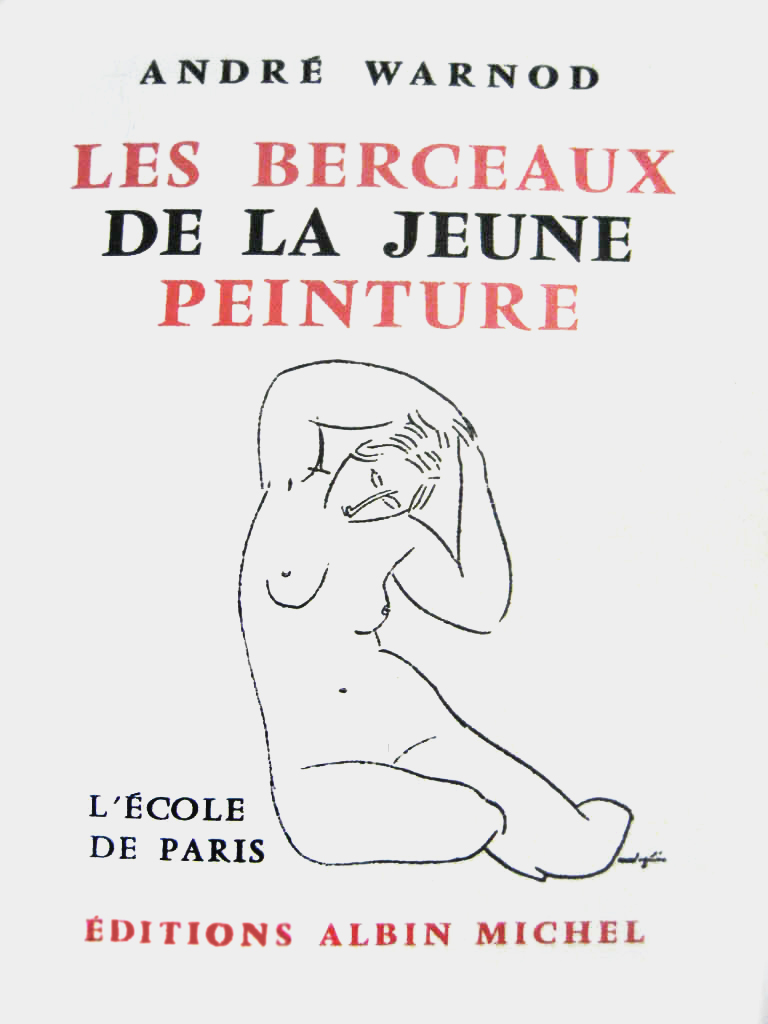
André Warnod, Les Berceaux de la jeune peinture, sketch by Modigliani

Between the two world wars, an art movement known as the École de Paris (School Of Paris), flourished. Centered in Paris, the movement gave rise to a unique form of Expressionist Art. It included many foreign and French artists, many of whom were Jewish; these artists were primarily centered in Montparnasse. These Jewish artists played a significant role in the École de Paris, several had sought refuge in Paris from Eastern Europe escaping persecution and pogroms. Prominent figures such as Marc Chagall, Jules Pascin, Chaïm Soutine, Isaac Frenkel Frenel, Amedeo Modigliani, and Abraham Mintchine were among notable contributors to the movement in France and abroad. These artists often depicted Jewish themes in their work, imbuing it with intense emotional tones.

The term "l’École de Paris," coined in 1925 to counter xenophobia, acknowledged the foreign, often Jewish, artists. However, the Nazi occupation led to the tragic loss of Jewish artists during the Holocaust, resulting in the decline of the School of Paris as some artists left or fled to Israel or the United States.

===== Post War =====
In the 1940s, abstract painting gained momentum and critical recognition after World War II with the Abstraction lyrique or Tachisme, the French versions of informal art. Its main representants were Jean Fautrier, Pierre Soulages, Jean Dubuffet, Nicolas de Staël and Georges Mathieu. By the 1950s Paris was again the main European artistic capital, drawing painters from all over the world, like Hans Hartung, Serge Poliakoff, Gérard Schneider, Simon Hantaï and Zao Wou-Ki. The late 1950s and early 1960s in France saw art forms that might be considered Pop Art. Yves Klein had attractive nude women roll around in blue paint and throw themselves at canvases while Martial Raysse incorporated photography, adverts and collage in his works. Affichistes like Raymond Hains and Jacques Villeglé practiced Décollage, images created by ripping and tearing away or otherwise removing pieces of an original image.

The Romanian-born Victor Vasarely invented Op-Art by designing sophisticated optical patterns while the eleven artists regrouped in the collective Groupe de Recherche d'Art Visuel, like François Morellet and Julio Le Parc, investigated a wide spectrum of kinetic art and op art optical effects by using various types of artificial light and mechanical movement. Artists of the Fluxus movement such as Ben Vautier incorporated graffiti and found objects into their work. Niki de Saint Phalle created bloated and vibrant plastic figures. The Nouveaux Réalistes group incorporated real objects from everyday life in their work: Arman gathered together found objects in boxed or resin-coated assemblages, and César Baldaccini produced a series of large compressed object-sculptures. César created large waste sculptures by compressing discarded materials, for instance, automobiles, metal, rubbish, and domestic objects.

Pop Art painting arrived in France in the early 1960s and was known as Figuration narrative, a more politically engaged version than its American counterpart. Some of its main tenants were Hervé Télémaque, Gérard Fromanger, Bernard Rancillac and Jacques Monory.

In May 1968, the radical youth movement, through their atelier populaire, produced a great deal of poster-art protesting the moribund policies of president Charles de Gaulle.

Many contemporary artists continue to be haunted by the horrors of the Second World War and the specter of the Holocaust. Christian Boltanski's harrowing installations of the lost and the anonymous are particularly powerful.

== French and Western Art museums of France ==
=== In Paris ===
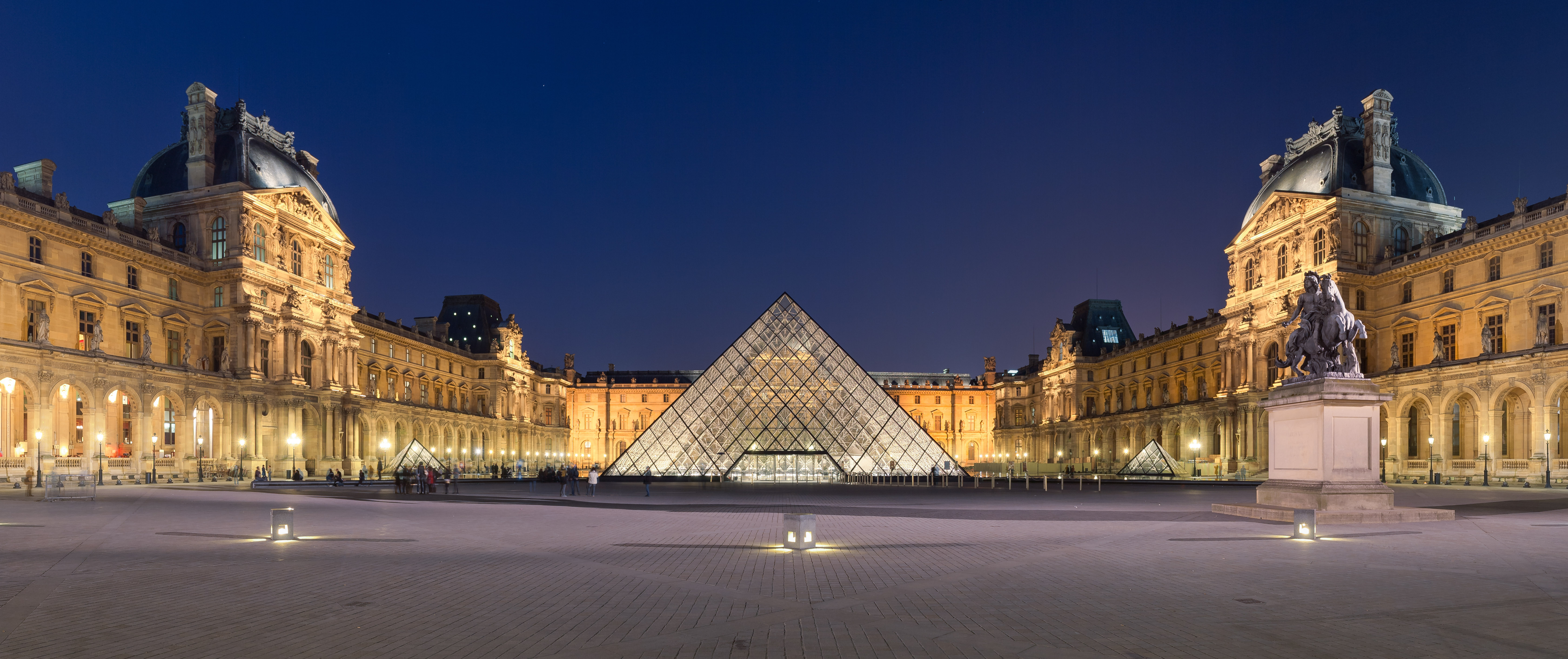
Musée du Louvre

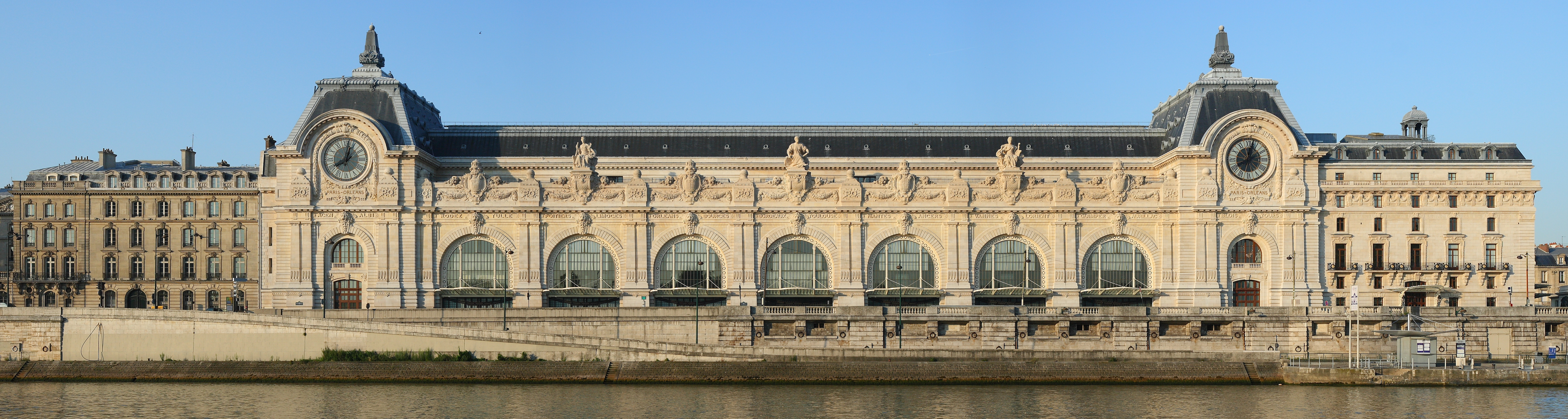
Musée d'Orsay

- Musée du Louvre
- Musée d'Orsay
- Musée National d'Art Moderne
- Musée de Cluny
- Musée d'Art Moderne de la Ville de Paris
- Petit Palais
- Musée Picasso
- Musée Rodin
- Musée de l'Orangerie
- Musée Zadkine
- Musée Maillol
- Musée Bourdelle
- Musée Gustave Moreau
- Musée Jacquemart-André
- Musée national Eugène Delacroix
- Musée national Jean-Jacques Henner
- Musée Marmottan Monet
- Musée des Arts Décoratifs, Paris
- Musée Nissim de Camondo
- Musée Cognacq-Jay
- Musée Carnavalet

=== Near Paris ===
- Musée Condé in Chantilly
- Musée des Beaux-Arts de Chartres in Chartres
- Musée de la Renaissance in Écouen
- Musée d'archéologie nationale in Saint-Germain-en-Laye
- Musée départemental Maurice Denis "The Priory" in Saint-Germain-en-Laye
- Musée d'art et d'archéologie de Senlis in Senlis
- Sèvres - Musée de la céramique in Sèvres

=== Outside Paris ===
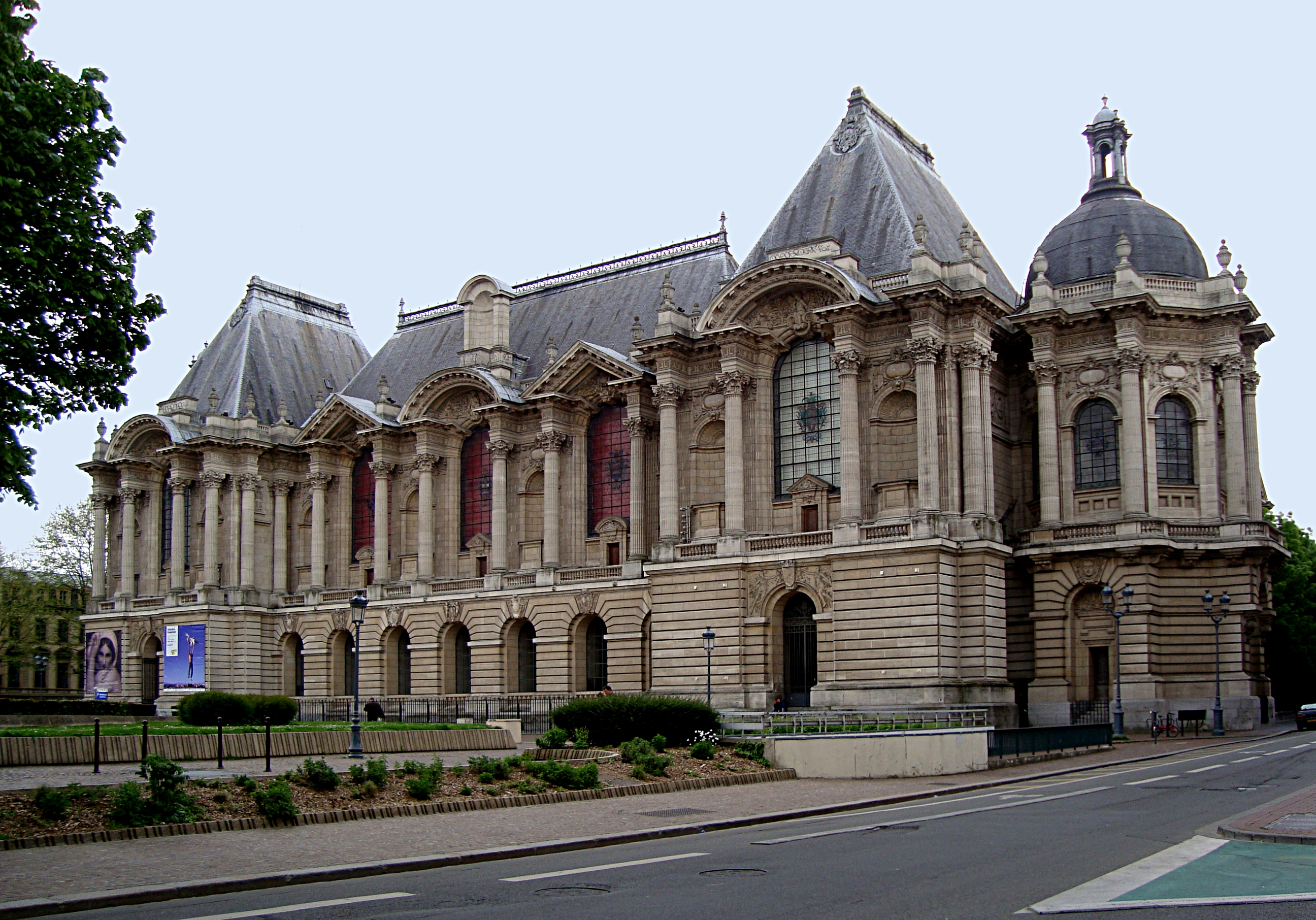
Palais des Beaux-Arts de Lille

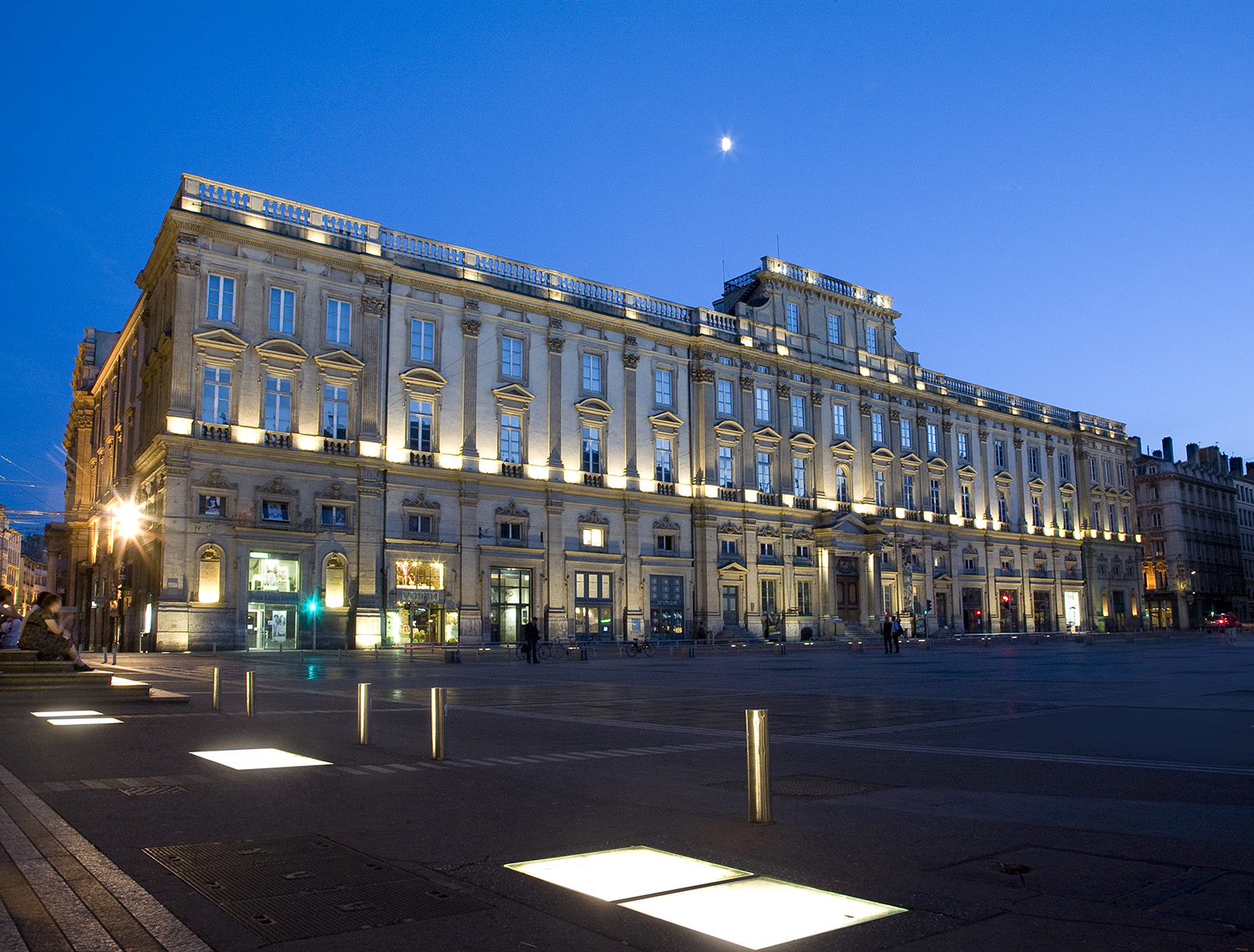
Musée des beaux-arts de Lyon

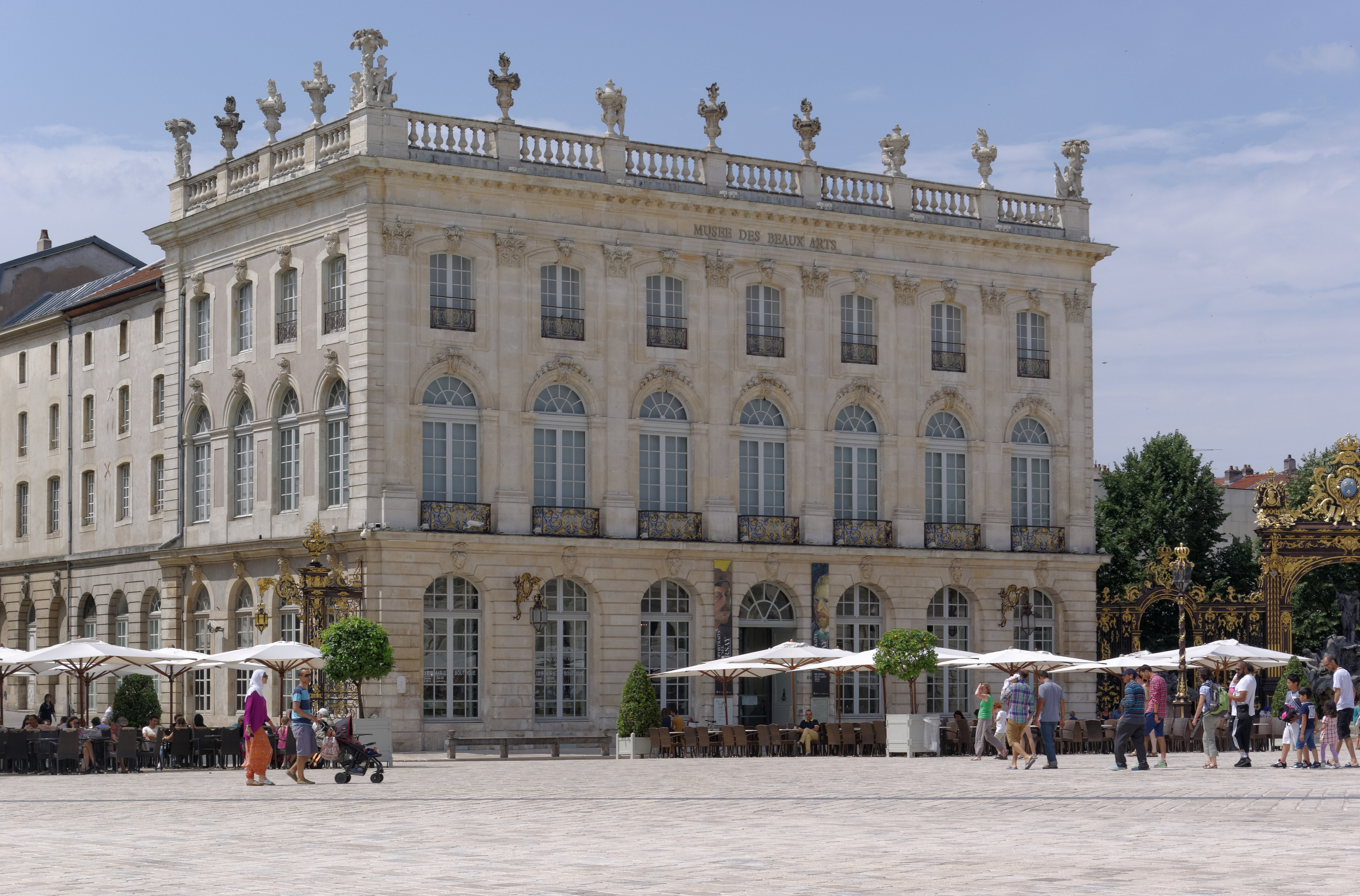
Musée des Beaux-Arts de Nancy

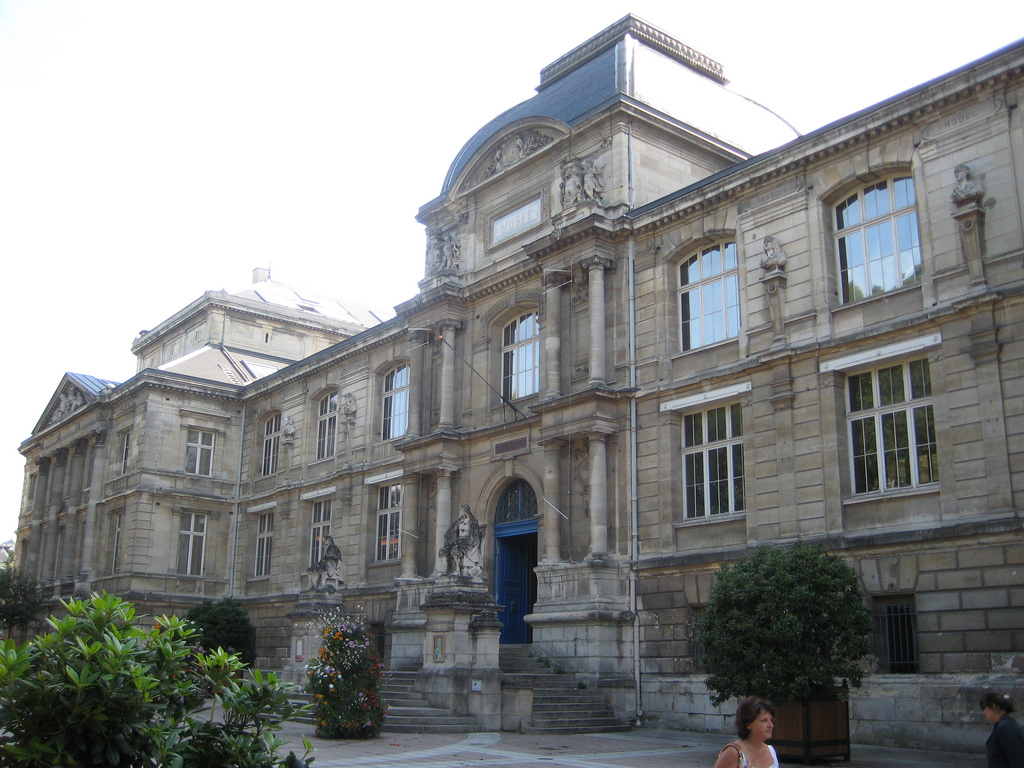
Musée des Beaux-Arts de Rouen

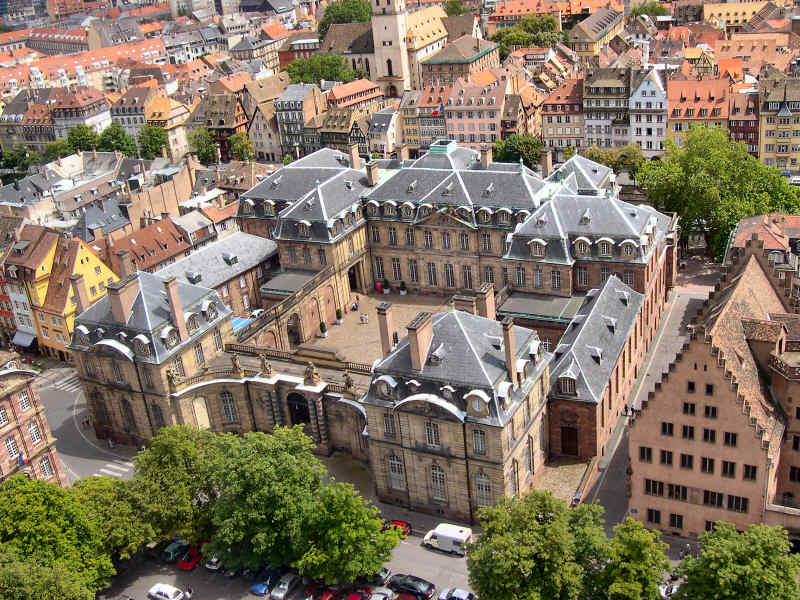
Palais Rohan, Strasbourg and Musée de l’Œuvre Notre-Dame (on the right)

==== Major museums ====
(alphabetically by city)

- Musée Faure in Aix-les-Bains
- Musée Granet in Aix-en-Provence
- Musée Toulouse-Lautrec in Albi
- Musée de Picardie in Amiens
- Musée de l'Arles et de la Provence antiques in Arles
- Musée du Petit Palais in Avignon
- Fondation Calvet in Avignon
- Musée Albert-André in Bagnols-sur-Cèze
- Musée Bonnat in Bayonne
- Musée des Beaux-Arts et d'archéologie de Besançon in Besançon
- Musée Fernand Léger in Biot, Alpes-Maritimes
- Musée des beaux-arts de Bordeaux in Bordeaux
- Musée des Beaux-Arts de Caen in Caen
- Goya Museum in Castres
- Musée d'Art Moderne de Céret in Céret
- Musée d'art Roger-Quilliot in Clermont-Ferrand
- Unterlinden Museum in Colmar
- Musée des Beaux-Arts de Dijon in Dijon
- Musée départemental d'Art ancien et contemporain in Épinal
- Jacquemart-André museum in Fontaine-Chaalis
- Musée de Grenoble in Grenoble
- Grenoble Archaeological Museum in Grenoble
- Musée Matisse in Le Cateau-Cambrésis
- Musée des Beaux-Arts André-Malraux in Le Havre
- Palais des Beaux-Arts de Lille in Lille
- Musée des beaux-arts de Lyon in Lyon
- Musée gallo-romain in Lyon
- Musée des beaux-arts de Marseille in Marseille
- Musée Cantini in Marseille
- Museums of Metz in Metz
- Centre Pompidou-Metz in Metz
- Musée Ingres in Montauban
- Musée Fabre in Montpellier
- Château de Montsoreau-Museum of Contemporary Art in Montsoreau
- Musée des Beaux-Arts de Nancy in Nancy
- Musée de l'École de Nancy in Nancy
- Musée Lorrain in Nancy
- Musée des Beaux-Arts de Nantes in Nantes
- Musée des Beaux-Arts in Nice
- Musée national Message Biblique Marc Chagall in Nice
- Musée archéologique de Nîmes in Nîmes
- Musée Camille Claudel in Nogent-sur-Seine
- Musée des Beaux-Arts de Reims in Reims
- Palais du Tau in Reims
- Musée des Beaux-Arts de Rennes in Rennes
- Musée des Beaux-Arts de Rouen in Rouen
- Musée d'art moderne de Saint-Étienne in Saint-Étienne
- Fondation Maeght in Saint-Paul, Alpes-Maritimes
- Musée des Beaux-Arts de Strasbourg in Strasbourg
- Musée d'art moderne et contemporain of Strasbourg in Strasbourg
- Musée de l’Œuvre Notre-Dame in Strasbourg
- Musée des Arts décoratifs, Strasbourg in Strasbourg
- Musée des Augustins in Toulouse
- Musée Saint-Raymond in Toulouse
- Fondation Bemberg in Toulouse

==== Other museums ====
(alphabetically by city)

- Musée des Beaux-Arts de Brest in Brest
- Musée Théodore Deck et des pays du Florival in Guebwiller
- Musée historique de Haguenau in Haguenau
- Musée Eugène Boudin in Honfleur
- Musée Crozatier in Le Puy-en-Velay
- Musée des Beaux-Arts de Libourne in Libourne
- Musée Girodet in Montargis
- Musée des Beaux-Arts de Mulhouse in Mulhouse
- Musée des Beaux-Arts de Nîmes in Nîmes
- Musée des Beaux-Arts de Pau in Pau
- Musée Hyacinthe Rigaud in Perpignan
- Musée des Beaux-Arts de Pont-Aven in Pont-Aven
- La Piscine Museum in Roubaix
- Musée Paul-Dupuy in Toulouse
- Musée des Beaux-Arts de Valenciennes in Valenciennes

=== Textile and tapestry museums ===
(alphabetically by city)

- Musée des tapisseries in Aix-en-Provence
- Château d'Angers in Angers
- Musée de la tapisserie de Bayeux in Bayeux
- Musée des Tissus et des Arts décoratifs in Lyon
- Musée de l'impression sur étoffes in Mulhouse
- Musée Galliera in Paris
- Gobelins Manufactory in Paris
- Musée du papier peint in Rixheim

== Vocabulary ==
French words and expressions dealing with the arts:

- peintre — painter
  - peinture à l'huile — oil painting
- tableau — painting
- toile — canvas
- gravure — print
- dessin — drawing
- aquarelle — watercolor
- croquis — sketch
- ébauche — draft
- crayon — pencil
- paysage — landscape
- nature morte — still life
- la peinture d'histoire — History painting, see Hierarchy of genres
- tapisserie – tapestry
- vitrail – stained glass

== See also ==
- List of French artists
- For information about French literature, see: French literature
- For information about French history, see: History of France
- For other topics on French culture, see: French culture

== References and further reading ==
- Anthony Blunt: Art and Architecture in France 1500–1700. ISBN 0-300-05314-2.
- André Chastel. French Art Vol I: Prehistory to the Middle Ages. ISBN 2-08-013566-X.
- André Chastel. French Art Vol II: The Renaissance. ISBN 2-08-013583-X.
- André Chastel. French Art Vol III: The Ancient Régime. ISBN 2-08-013617-8.
- French Art at the Saint Louis Art Museum

Specific
