= Dance of Time =

Dance of Time may refer to:

- Dance of Time (Clodion), a 1788 sculpture by Claude Michel
- Dance of Time (album), a 2017 album by Eliane Elias
- Adiemus III: Dances of Time, a 1998 album by Karl Jenkins
- The Dance of Time, a 1936 Italian film
- Dance of Time, a 2009 documentary film by Song Il-gon
- Dance of Time (Ples vremena), a 2007 poetry collection by Dejan Stojanović
- The Dance of Time, a 2006 novel in the Belisarius series
