= Nicolas-Sébastien Adam =

French sculptor

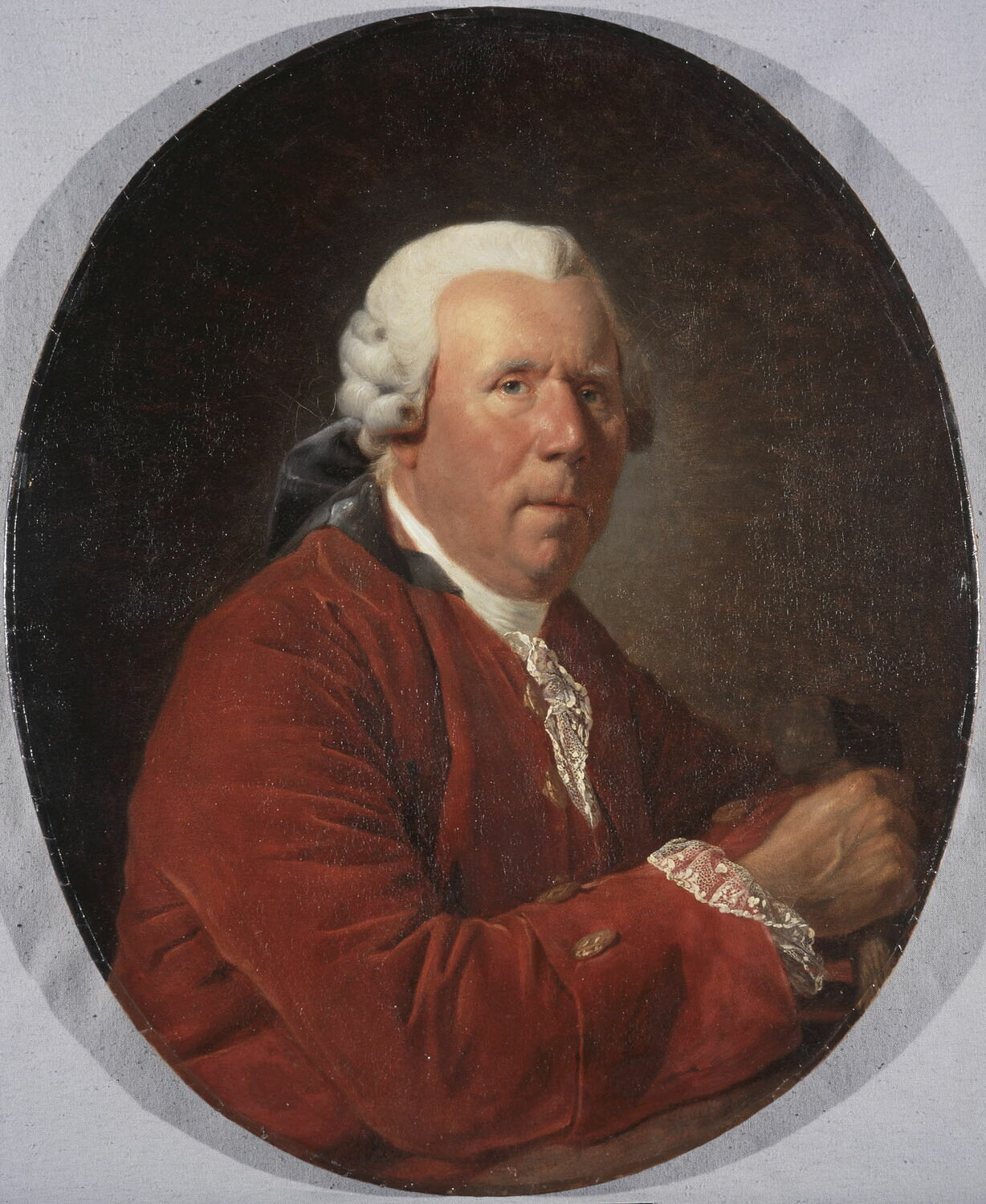
Portrait of the sculptor Adam by Étienne Aubry

Nicolas-Sébastien Adam (22 March 1705 – 27 March 1778), also called "Adam the Younger", was a French sculptor working in the Neoclassical style. He was born in Nancy and died in Paris.

== Life ==
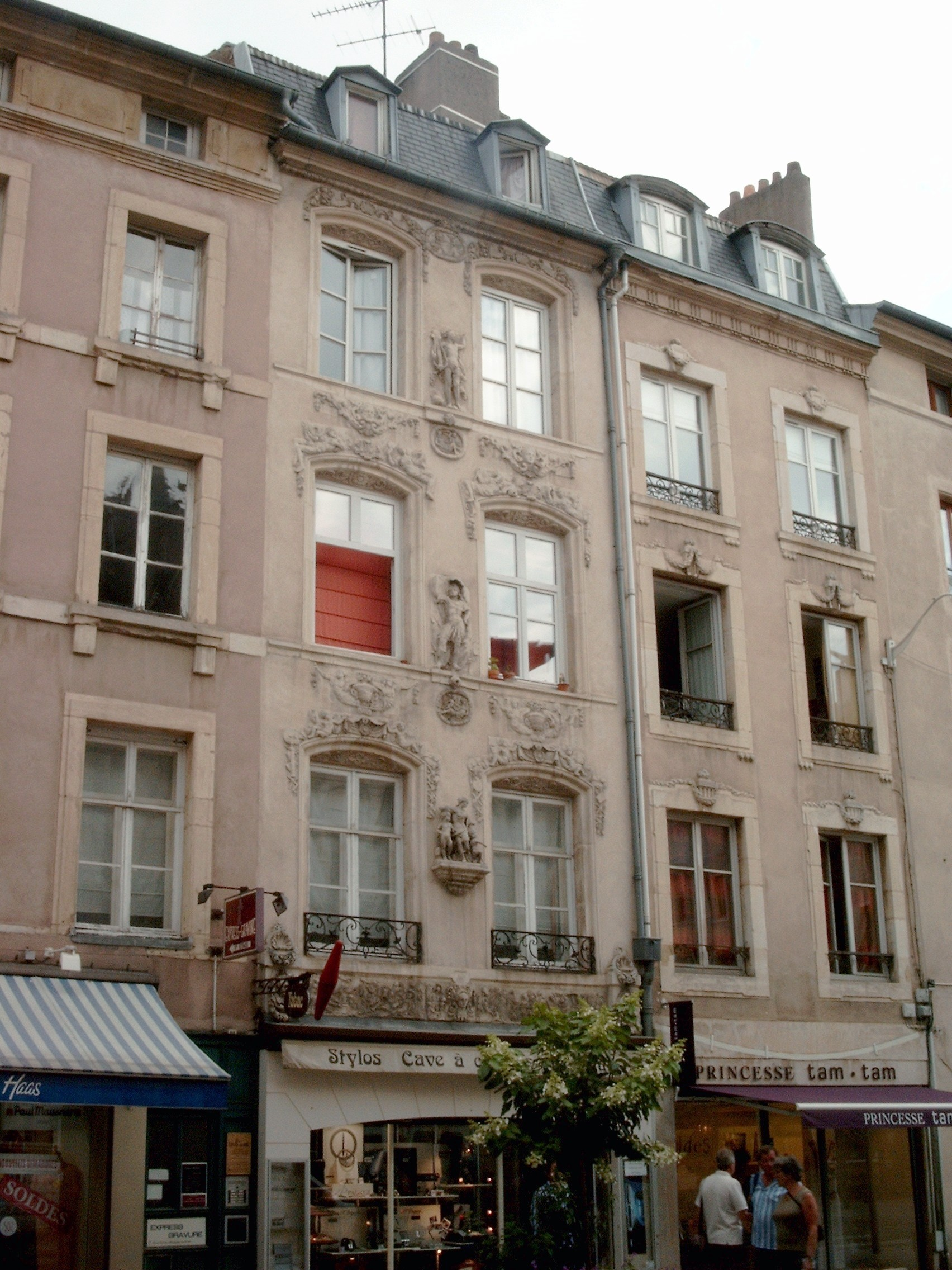
The Adam family home in Nancy

Adam was the youngest of the three sons of the sculptor Jacob Sigisbert Adam of Nancy. His brothers Lambert-Sigisbert Adam and François Gaspard Adam were also sculptors.

In 1757, Adam married Christine Lenoir, the daughter of a goldsmith in Nancy. They had two sons, the painter Jean Charles Nicolas Adam and the sculptor Gaspard Louis Adam.

Nicolas Adam was blind when he died in 1778 in Paris.

== Career ==
Adam studied first with his father, then with his elder brother Lambert, at the Académie royale de peinture et de sculpture (Royal Academy of Painting and Sculpture). He failed to obtain the prix de Rome, but did receive funding to travel to Italy. Along the way, he stopped to work on the ornamental façade of the Château de la Mosson at Juvignac, near Montpellier, spending 18 months on the project. He finally arrived in Rome in 1726. His brother introduced him to the cardinal Melchior de Polignac, for whom he restored a number of ancient marbles.

Adam returned to Paris in 1734, working in his elder brother's atelier. Soon he began to receive a number of commissions. With his brother, he worked on Le Triomphe de Neptune et d'Amphitrite ("The Triumph of Neptune and Amphitrite," completed 1740), the large sculpture group in lead for the Neptune fountain at the Palace of Versailles.

During the same period, he worked for the Rohan family at the Hôtel de Soubise, sculpting bas-reliefs for Amours des Dieux ("The Gods' Love Affairs", 1736) in the state chamber of the Princess. The Bâtiments du Roi commissioned him for work at the Courts of Accounts in Paris, at the Basilica of St. Denis, and on the royal chapel at Versailles. At the abbey he created a bas-relief Saint Maur Seeking the Aid of the Lord for the Healing of a Child. The fathers at the Oratory of Paris entrusted him with the decoration of the church portal.

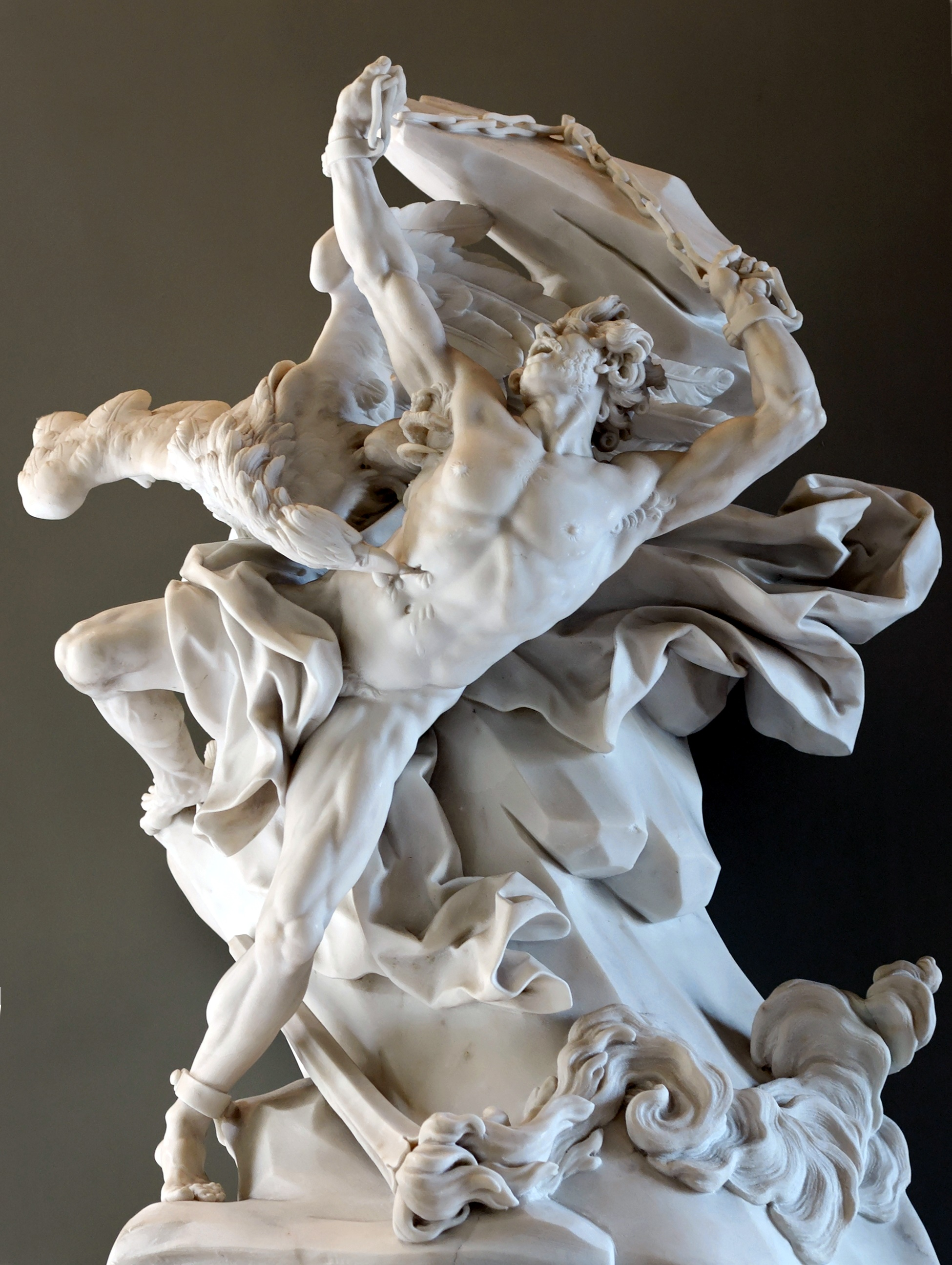
Prometheus Bound (1762), Adam's reception piece for the Academy

His reception piece for the Academy in 1762 was Prometheus Bound (French Prométhée enchaîné) considered one of the masterpieces of 18th-century sculpture. His most notable work, however, is the funeral monument of the queen Catherine Opalińska, wife of Stanislas Leszczyński, at the Notre-Dame-de-Bonsecours church in Nancy. It depicts the deceased kneeling, with her hands joined in an attitude of prayer. An angel takes her by the hand to guide her to Heaven. The base is of black marble. Executed with great elegance, the group is regarded as one of the most remarkable and genuinely moving funeral monuments of the 18th century.

Nicolas Adam, like his brother Lambert, was influenced by the Italian Baroque. He ranks with him as one of the most refined and subtle sculptors of his time. He was a major influence on his nephew, the sculptor Clodion.

== Selected works ==
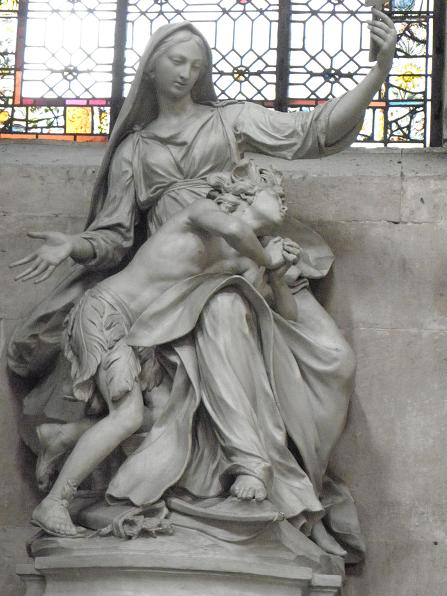
Religion Instructing an Indian (1745), expressing the colonialist attitudes of 18th-century Europe

- Nymph (c. 1723), bas-relief in the pediment of the great hall, and berry ornamentation on the ground floor of the Château de la Mosson, Juvignac
- The Triumph of Neptune and Amphitrite (1735 - 1740), lead sculpture for the fountain at Versailles, in collaboration with his brother Lambert Sigisbert Adam
- Les Amours des Dieux ("Love Affairs of the Gods," 1736), stucco relief, Hôtel de Soubise, Paris, the chamber of the Princess image
- L'Automne ("Autumn," 1745), marble vase, originally created for the grounds at the Château de Choisy, now in the collections of the Metropolitan Museum of Art
- Religion Instructing an Indian (1745), marble statue group, church of Saint-Paul-Saint-Louis, Paris
- The Martyrdom of Saint Victoria (1747), bronze relief, bronze, royal chapel at Versailles
- Funeral monument of the queen Catherine Opalińska (1749), marble and bronze, Notre-Dame-de-Bonsecours at Nancy, France
- A series of narrative reliefs on Apollo: Apollo et Daphne, Latona and the Farmers, Apollo and the Sibyl, Apollo and Coronis (c. 1753), bas-reliefs for the Hôtel de la Bouëxière in Paris, Château de Bagatelle et Musée Carnavalet
- Angelica and Medoro from Orlando Furioso, a marble statue group along with Apollo and Diana, originally created for the Hôtel de Choiseul in Paris, now in the Museum of Amiens
- Prometheus Bound (1762), a marble sculpture group at the Louvre
- Iris Putting on Her Wings (1775–76), a marble statue finished by his nephew Clodion, Versailles

== Sources ==
- Geneviève Bresc-Bautier, Isabelle Leroy-Jay Lemaistre (under the direction of Jean-René Gaborit, in collaboration with Jean-Charles Agboton, Hélène Grollemund, Michèle Lafabrie, Béatrice Tupinier-Barillon), Musée du Louvre. département des sculptures du Moyen Âge, de la Renaissance et des temps modernes. Sculpture française II. Renaissance et temps modernes. vol. 1 Adam - Gois, Éditions de la Réunion des musées nationaux, Paris, 1998
- Jean de Viguerie, Histoire et dictionnaire du temps des Lumières. 1715-1789, Paris, Robert Laffont, coll. Bouquins, 2003 - ISBN 2-221-04810-5
