= Sanssouci at the time of Frederick William IV =

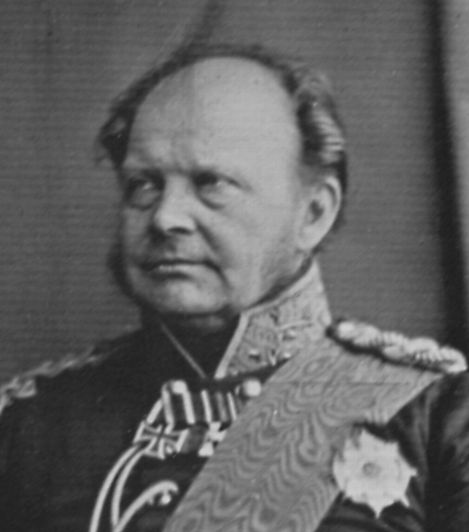
Frederick William IV

Sanssouci at the time of Frederick William IV covers the period almost one hundred years after the palace's construction, when a King who was convinced of the divine right of his crown and of the absolute claim to power of the ruler came to the Prussian throne. It was a time of social unrest, its bloody climax being the March Revolution of 1848. Frederick William IV, the romantic on the throne, admired and respected the person and world of Frederick the Great very much. He believed that he had much in common with Frederick as to their complex interests, especially in the area of architecture and artistic design. But Frederick William IV was not sufficiently astute for the political re-orientation that occurred in the middle of the 19th century. He sought the authentication of his own claim to power and the role of the regent through his proximity to his admirable ancestor.

Whilst still crown prince, Frederick William had shown a great interest in Sanssouci Palace and the park of his great-great uncle Frederick. The oldest son of Frederick William III and Louise of Mecklenburg-Strelitz asked for permission to use the palace of his ancestor in 1832, although he and his wife Elisabeth Ludovika of Bavaria could have moved into the since built Charlottenhof Palace, whose grounds were connected to the Frederician park.

After his accession to the throne in 1840, exactly one hundred years after the beginning of the reign of Frederick the Great, the royal couple finally moved into the guestrooms in the "göttliche Sanssouci" (divine Sanssouci), as Frederick William called it. They retained the existing furniture and replaced missing pieces with furniture from the Frederician period. The room in which Frederick the Great had died, transfigured under Frederick William II, was to be repaired back to its original state, but this plan was never realised for lack of authentic documents and plans. The only thing to arrive back at its old place (in 1843) was the armchair in which Frederick had died.

The need for extensive remodeling of the side wings and the larger issue of the lack of a courtyard made reconstruction and extension necessary. Frederick William IV commissioned Ludwig Persius to develop the plans and Ferdinand von Arnim supervised the construction. With architectural sensitivity, the design elements which were situated on the north facing front of the building became more prominent. As a result of Knobelsdorff's ideas, the front had received a more serious presentational character than the cheerfully playful garden front and with great surety of style, the new and old were connected.

During the design of the interior of the west wing Rococo style was reintroduced. The second period of Rococo was a part of the multi-faceted artistic movement of the mid 1820s. However, it was not only a fashionable trend for Frederick William IV and the palace, but also a revival of the artistic values of Frederick the Great and therefore to this extent only found at Sanssouci. Indeed Frederick William IV preferred the Antique, the Renaissance and the Classical architectural styles for the numerous other buildings created during his reign in Potsdam.

After a serious illness, Frederick William IV died 2 January 1861 in Sanssouci, his "Traumschloss" (dream palace), and was buried nearby. His tomb had been built between 1845 and 1848 in the Church of Peace in Sanssouci Park. His widow, Elisabeth Ludovika, lived in the palace, somewhat a recluse, during the summer months for another thirteen years and was its last female resident. In February 1861 she wrote to her nephew Otto, who at the time was King of Greece:

I live on quietly, in the place which he loved so, constantly beautified, and where he spent the last part of his life without interruption...the thousand melancholic memories of the happy times and particularly of his final suffering broke my heart. Nevertheless I stay. One can't flee the pain, it comes with one, and the longing would have driven me back here in any case.

Elisabeth Ludovika died on 14 December 1873 and was buried next to Frederick William IV in the Church of Peace.
