= Sanssouci =

Historical building in Potsdam, Germany

- Schloss Sanssouci
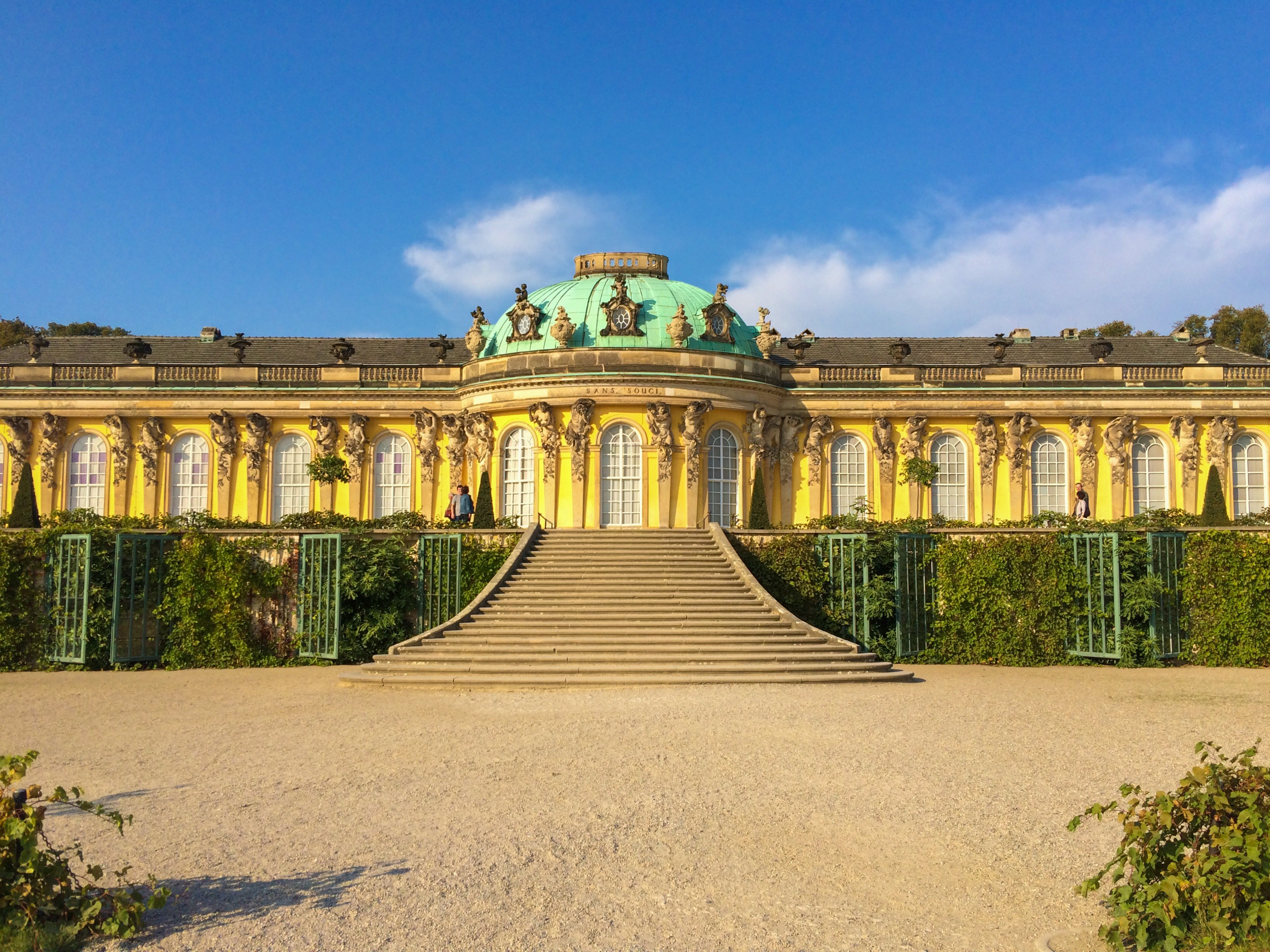
- The south façade of Sanssouci
- Interactive fullscreen map

General information
- Type: Palace
- Architectural style: Rococo
- Location: Potsdam, Germany
- Coordinates: 52°24′12″N 13°02′19″E
- Construction started: 1745
- Completed: 1747
- Client: Frederick the Great
- Owner: Prussian Palaces and Gardens Foundation Berlin-Brandenburg

Design and construction
- Architect: Georg Wenzeslaus von Knobelsdorff

Website
- Official website

UNESCO World Heritage Site
- Type: Cultural
- Criteria: i, ii, iv
- Designated: 1990 (14th session)
- Part of: Palaces and Parks of Potsdam and Berlin
- Reference no.: 532
- Region: Europe and North America

Schloss Sanssouci (German pronunciation: [ˈsãːsusi]) is a historical building in Potsdam, near Berlin. Built by Prussian King Frederick the Great as his summer palace, it is often counted among the German rivals of Versailles. While Sanssouci is in the more intimate Rococo style and is far smaller than its French Baroque counterpart, it is similarly notable for the numerous temples and follies in the surrounding park. The palace was designed and built by Georg Wenzeslaus von Knobelsdorff between 1745 and 1747 to meet Frederick's need for a private residence where he could escape the pomp and ceremony of the royal court. The palace's name is a French phrase (sans souci) meaning "without worries" or "carefree", emphasising that the palace was meant as a place of relaxation rather than a seat of power.

Sanssouci is little more than a large, single-storey villa—more like the Château de Marly than Versailles. Containing just ten principal rooms, it was built on the brow of a terraced hill at the centre of the park. The influence of King Frederick's personal taste in the design and decoration of the palace was so great that its style is characterised as "Frederician Rococo", and his feelings for the palace were so strong that he conceived it as "a place that would die with him". Because of a disagreement about the site of the palace in the park, Knobelsdorff was fired in 1746. Jan Bouman, a Dutch architect, finished the project.

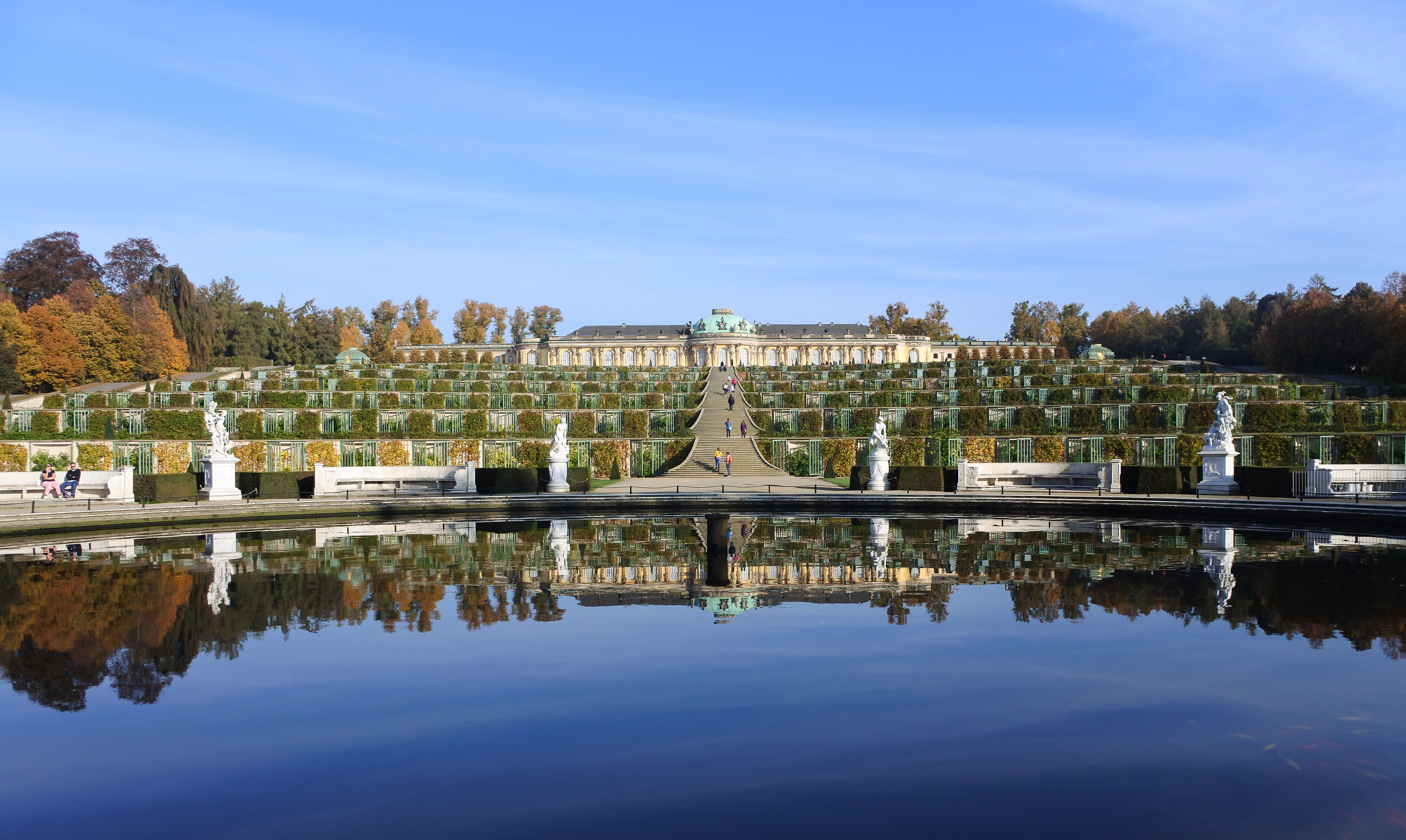
Sanssouci Palace and its reflection in the pond at Sanssouci Park

During the 19th century, the palace became a residence of Frederick William IV. He employed the architect Ludwig Persius to restore and enlarge the palace, while Ferdinand von Arnim was charged with improving the grounds and thus the view from the palace. The town of Potsdam, with its palaces, was a favourite place of residence for the German imperial family until the fall of the Hohenzollern dynasty in 1918.

After World War II, the palace became a tourist attraction in East Germany. Following German reunification in 1990, Frederick's body was returned to the palace and buried in a new tomb overlooking the gardens he had created. Sanssouci and its extensive gardens became a World Heritage Site in 1990 under the protection of UNESCO; in 1995, the Prussian Palaces and Gardens Foundation Berlin-Brandenburg was established to care for Sanssouci and the other former imperial palaces in and around Berlin. These palaces are now visited by more than two million people each year from all over the world.

== Ethos of Sanssouci ==
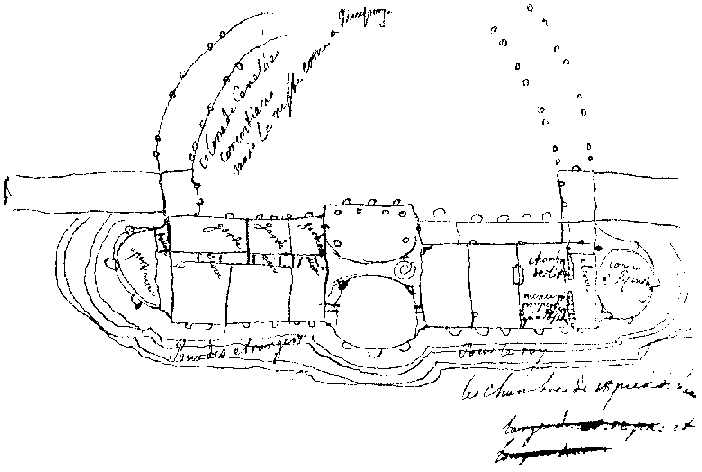
Frederick the Great's sketch for the plan of Sanssouci was the prototype for the palace (north is at the top). A single enfilade of ten principal rooms forms the south-facing corps de logis. To the north, two segmented colonnades form a cour d'honneur. Two flanking service wings (hidden from view, screened by trees and covered by climbing plants) provide the necessary but mundane domestic offices.

The location and layout of Sanssouci above a vineyard reflected the pre-Romantic ideal of harmony between man and nature, in a landscape ordered by human touch. Winemaking, however, was to take second place in the design of the palace and pleasure gardens. The hill on which Frederick created his terrace vineyard was to become the focal point of his demesne, crowned by the new, but small, palace—"mein Weinberghäuschen" ("my little vineyard house"), as Frederick called it. With its extensive views of the countryside in the midst of nature, Frederick wanted to reside there sans souci ("without a care") and to follow his personal and artistic interests. Hence, the palace was intended for the use of Frederick and his private guests—his sketch (illustration) indicated the balanced suites "pour les étrangers" and "pour le roy"—only during the summer months, from the end of April to the beginning of October.

Twenty years following his creation of Sanssouci, Frederick built the New Palace (Neues Palais) in the western part of the park. This far larger palace was in direct contrast to the relaxed ethos behind Sanssouci, and displayed Frederick's power and strength to the world, in the Baroque style. The design of the New Palace was intended to demonstrate that Prussia's capabilities were undiminished despite its near defeat in the Seven Years' War. Frederick made no secret of his intention, even referring to the new construction as his "fanfaronnade" ("showing off").

This concept of a grand palace designed to impress has led to the comparison of the palaces of Potsdam to Versailles, with Sanssouci being thrust into the role of one of the Trianons. This analogy, though easy to understand, ignores the original merits of the concept behind Sanssouci, the palace for which the whole park and setting were created. Unlike the Trianons, Sanssouci was not an afterthought to escape the larger palace, for the simple reason that the larger palace did not exist at the time of Sanssouci's conception; and once it did, Frederick almost never stayed in the New Palace except on rare occasions when entertaining diplomats he wished to impress. It is true, however, that Sanssouci was intended to be a private place of retreat rather than display of power, strength and architectural merit. Unlike the Trianons, Sanssouci was designed to be a whole unto itself.

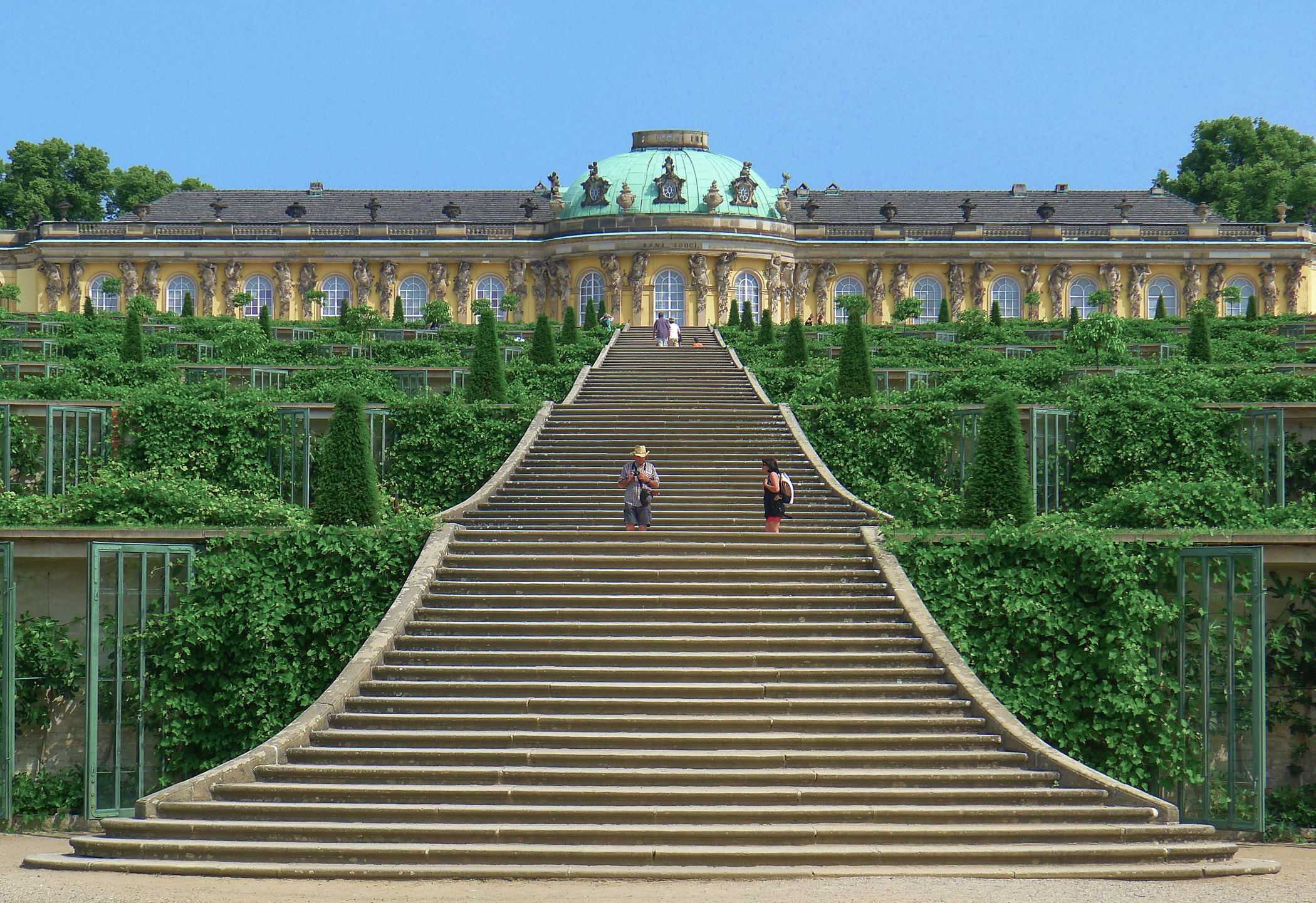
The south-facing garden façade. Frederick the Great ignored his architect's advice to place the piano nobile upon a low ground floor. As a result, the palace failed to take maximum advantage of its location. Its windows are devoid of views, and seen from its lower terraces it appears to be more of an orangery than a palace.

Sanssouci is small, with the principal block (or corps de logis) being a narrow single-storey enfilade of just ten rooms, including a service passage and staff rooms behind them. Frederick's amateur sketch of 1745 ('lillustrated above) demonstrates that his architect, Knobelsdorff, was more a draughtsman at Sanssouci than complete architect. Frederick appears to have accepted no suggestions for alteration to his plans, refusing Knobelsdorff's idea that the palace should have a semi-basement storey, which would not only have provided service areas closer at hand, but would have put the principal rooms on a raised piano nobile. This would have given the palace not only a more commanding presence, but also would have prevented the problems of dampness to which it has always been prone. However, Frederick wanted an intimate palace for living: for example, rather than scaling a large number of steps, he wanted to enter the palace immediately from the garden. He insisted on a building on the ground level, of which the pedestal was the hill: in short, this was to be a private pleasure house. His recurring theme and requirement were for a house with close connections between its style and free nature. The principal rooms, lit by tall slender windows, face south over the vineyard gardens; the north façade is the entrance front, where a semicircular cour d'honneur was created by two segmented Corinthian colonnades.

In the park, east of the palace, is the Sanssouci Picture Gallery, built from 1755 to 1764 under the supervision of the architect Johann Gottfried Büring. It stands on the site of a former greenhouse, where Frederick raised tropical fruit. The Picture Gallery is the oldest extant museum built for a ruler in Germany. Like the palace itself, it is a long, low building, dominated by a central domed bow of three bays.

To the west is the New Chambers, built between 1771 and 1775 as accommodation for guests and with rooms to entertain them. The building mirrors the Picture Gallery externally, thus adding to the symmetry of the Sanssouci ensemble.

Following the death of Frederick a new era began, a visible sign of which was the change in architectural styles. Neo-Classicism, popular elsewhere in Europe but ignored by Frederick, now found its way to Potsdam and Berlin during the reign of the new king Frederick William II. He ordered the construction of a new palace, the Marmorpalais, in the new more fashionable style, and stayed at Sanssouci only occasionally.

The reception and bedrooms were renovated and completely altered immediately after Frederick's death. Frederick William von Erdmannsdorff received the commission for the refurbishment. While Frederick had been constructing the New Palace in the Baroque style between 1763 and 1769, Erdmannsdorff, an advocate of the new neo-classical style, had created Schloss Wörlitz in Wörlitz Park, the first neo-classical palace in Germany. As a result of his influence, Sanssouci became the first of the palaces in Potsdam and Berlin to be remodelled with a neo-classical interior. In 1797, Frederick William II was succeeded by Frederick William III; he visited Sanssouci even less frequently than his father, preferring to spend the summer months in Paretz Palace or on the Pfaueninsel in Berlin.

== Architecture ==
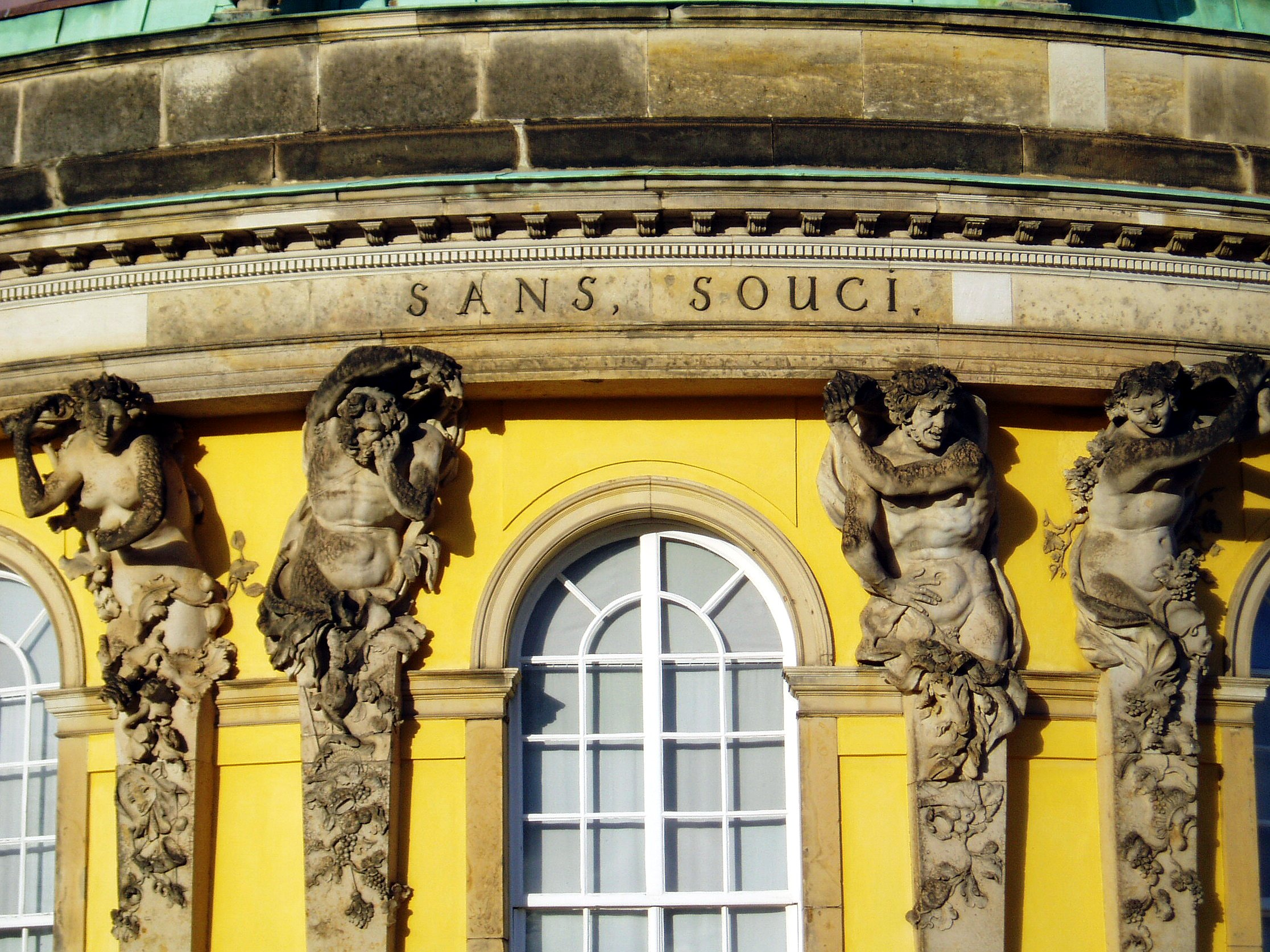
Architectural detail from the central bow of the garden façade: Atlantes and Caryatids.

It was no coincidence that Frederick selected the Rococo style of architecture for Sanssouci. The light, almost whimsical style then in vogue exactly suited the light-hearted uses for which he required this retreat. The Rococo style of art emerged in France in the early 18th century as a continuation of the Baroque style, but in contrast with the heavier themes and darker colours of the Baroque, the Rococo was characterised by an opulence, grace, playfulness, and lightness. Rococo motifs focused on the carefree aristocratic life and on light-hearted romance, rather than on heroic battles and religious figures. They also revolve around natural and exterior settings; this again suited Frederick's ideal of nature and design being in complete harmony. The palace was completed much as Frederick had envisaged in his preliminary sketches (see illustration above).

The palace has a single-storey principal block with two flanking side wings. The building occupies almost the entire upper terrace. The potential monotony of the façade is broken by a central bow, its dome rising above the hipped roof, with the name of the palace—remarkably, written with a comma and a full stop, viz. Sans, Souci.— on it in gilded bronze letters. The secondary side wings on the garden front are screened by two symmetrical rows of trees each terminating in free-standing trellised gazebos, richly decorated with gilded ornaments.

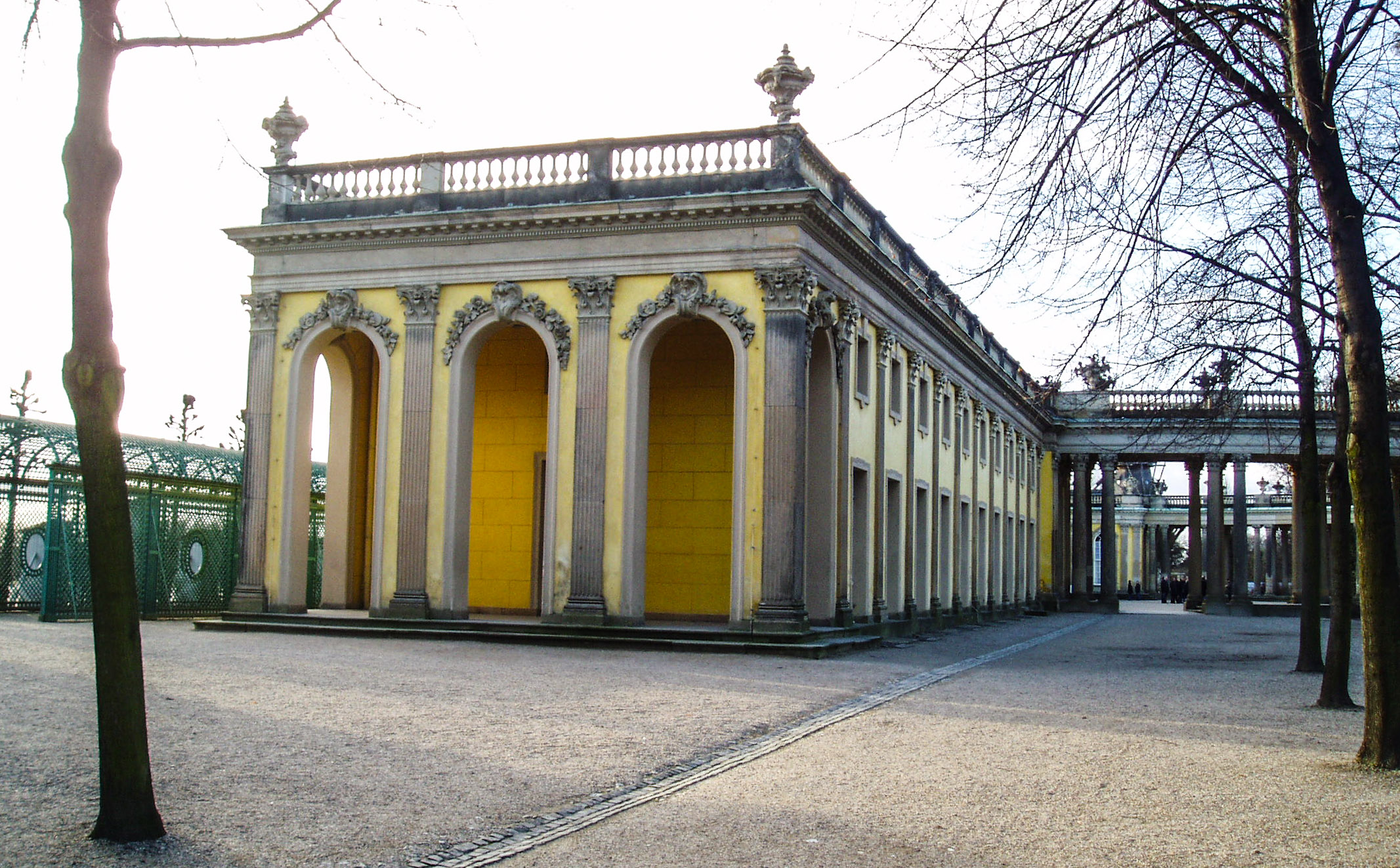
The East Wing. The two service wings, virtually hidden from sight by foliage in the time of Frederick the Great, were remodelled in the 19th century by Frederick William IV, who transformed the palace into a more conventional royal residence for family and court use.

The garden front of the palace is decorated by carved atlantes and caryatids; grouped in pairs between the windows, these appear to support the balustrade above. Executed in sandstone, these figures of both sexes represent Bacchants, the companions of the wine god Bacchus, and originate from the workshop of the sculptor Friedrich Christian Glume. The same workshop created the vases on the balustrade, and the groups of cherubs above the windows of the dome.

By contrast, the north entrance façade is more restrained. Segmented colonnades of 88 Corinthian columns—two deep—curve outwards from the palace building to enclose the semicircular cour d'honneur. As on the south side, a balustrade with sandstone vases decorates the roof of the main corps de logis.

Flanking the corps de logis are two secondary wings, providing the large service accommodation and domestic offices necessary to serve an 18th-century monarch, even when in retreat from the world. In Frederick's time, these single-storey wings were covered with foliage to screen their mundane purpose. The eastern wing housed the secretaries', gardeners' and servants' rooms, while the west wing held the palace kitchen, stables and a remise (coach house).

Frederick regularly occupied the palace each summer throughout his lifetime, but after his death in 1786 it remained mostly unoccupied and neglected until the mid-19th century. In 1840, 100 years after Frederick's accession to the throne, his great-grandnephew Frederick William IV and his wife moved into the guest rooms. The royal couple retained the existing furniture and replaced missing pieces with furniture from Frederick's time. The room in which Frederick had died was intended to be restored to its original state, but this plan was never executed because of a lack of authentic documents and plans. However, the armchair in which Frederick had died was returned to the palace in 1843.

Frederick William IV, a draftsman interested in both architecture and landscape gardening, transformed the palace from the retreat of his reclusive great uncle into a fully functioning and fashionable country house. The small service wings were enlarged between 1840 and 1842. This was necessary because, while Frederick philosophised and played music at Sanssouci, he liked to live modestly without splendour. As he aged, his modesty developed into miserliness. He would not permit repairs to the outer façade and allowed them in the rooms only with great reluctance. This was ascribed to his wish that Sanssouci should only last his lifetime.

The additions included a mezzanine floor to both wings. The kitchen was moved into the east wing. Frederick the Great's small wine cellar was enlarged to provide ample store rooms for the enlarged household, while the new upper floor provided staff bedrooms.

The west wing became known as "The Ladies' Wing", providing accommodation for ladies-in-waiting and guests. This was a common arrangement in mid-19th-century households, which often had a corresponding "Bachelor's Wing" for unmarried male guests and members of the household. The rooms were decorated with intricate boiseries, panelling and tapestries. This new accommodation for ladies was vital: entertaining at Sanssouci was minimal during the reign of Frederick the Great, and it is known that women were never entertained there, so there were no facilities for them. Frederick had married Elisabeth Christine of Brunswick-Bevern in 1733, but separated from his wife after his accession to the throne in 1740. The Queen resided alone at Schönhausen Palace in Berlin after the separation, and Frederick preferred Sanssouci to be "sans femmes" (without women).

== Interior of the palace ==
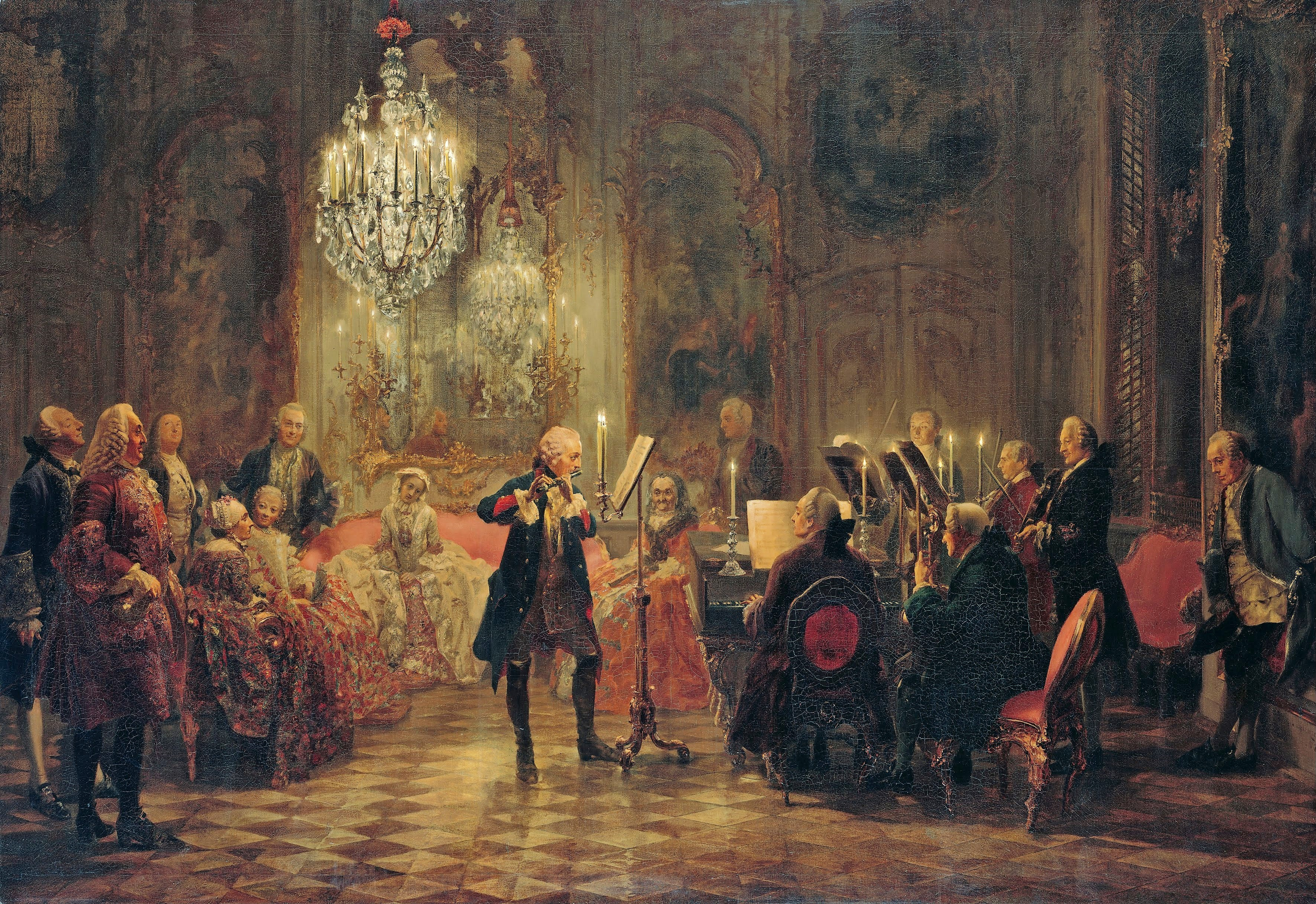
"The Flute Concert of Sanssouci" by Adolph von Menzel, 1852, depicts Frederick the Great playing the flute in his music room at Sanssouci.

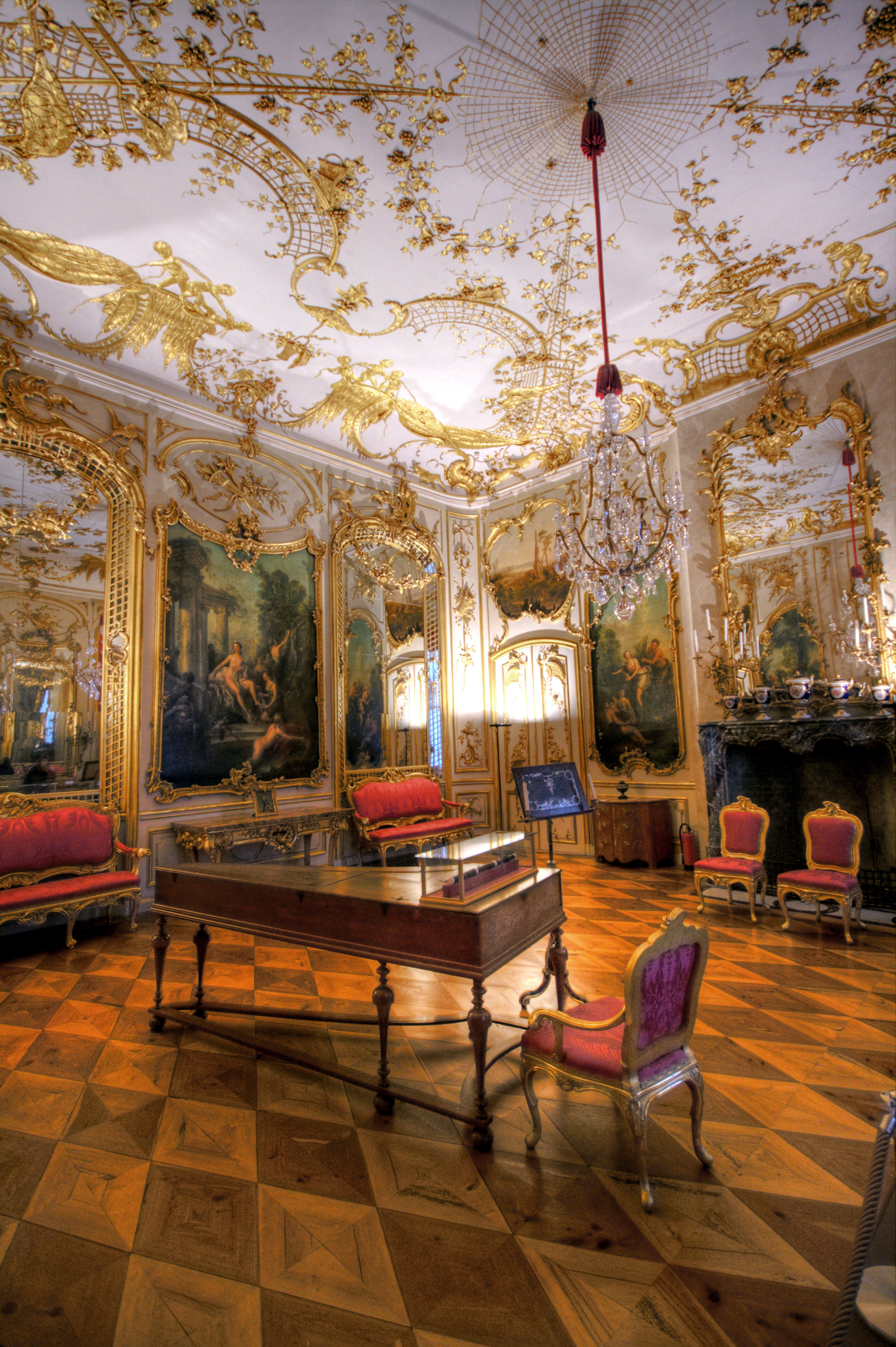
Music room (Konzertzimmer)

In the Baroque tradition, the principal rooms (including the bedrooms and toilets) are all on the piano nobile, which at Sanssouci was the ground floor by Frederick's choice. While the secondary wings have upper floors, the corps de logis occupied by the King occupies the full height of the structure. Comfort was also a priority in the layout of the rooms. The palace expresses contemporary French architectural theory in its apartement double ideals of courtly comfort, comprising two rows of rooms, one behind the other. The main rooms face the garden, looking southwards, while the servant's quarters in the row behind are on the north side of the building. An apartement double thus consists of a main room and a servant's chamber. Doors connect the apartments with each other. They are arranged as an "enfilade", so that the entire indoor length of the palace can be assessed at a glance.

Frederick sketched his requirements for decoration and layout, and these sketches were interpreted by artists such as Johann August Nahl, the Hoppenhaupt brothers, the Spindler brothers and Johann Melchior Kambly, who all not only created works of art, but decorated the rooms in the Rococo style. While Frederick cared little about etiquette and fashion, he also wanted to be surrounded by beautiful objects and works of art. He arranged his private apartments according to his personal taste and needs, often ignoring the current trends and fashions. These "self-compositions" in Rococo art led to the term "Frederician Rococo".

The principal entrance area, consisting of two halls, the "Entrance Hall" and the "Marble Hall", is at the centre, thus providing common rooms for the assembly of guests and the court, while the principal rooms flanking the Marble Hall become progressively more intimate and private, in the tradition of the Baroque concept of state rooms. Thus, the Marble Hall was the principal reception room beneath the central dome. Five guest rooms adjoined the Marble Hall to the west, while the King's apartments lay to the east - an audience room, music room, study, bedroom, library, and a long gallery on the north side.

The palace is generally entered through the Entrance Hall, where the restrained form of the classical external colonnade was continued into the interior. The walls of the rectangular room were subdivided by ten pairs of Corinthian columns made of white stucco marble with gilded capitals. Three overdoor reliefs with themes from the myth of Bacchus reflected the vineyard theme created outside. Georg Franz Ebenhech was responsible for gilded stucco works. The strict classical elegance was relieved by a painted ceiling executed by the Swedish-born painter Johann Harper, depicting the goddess Flora with her acolytes, throwing flowers down from the sky.

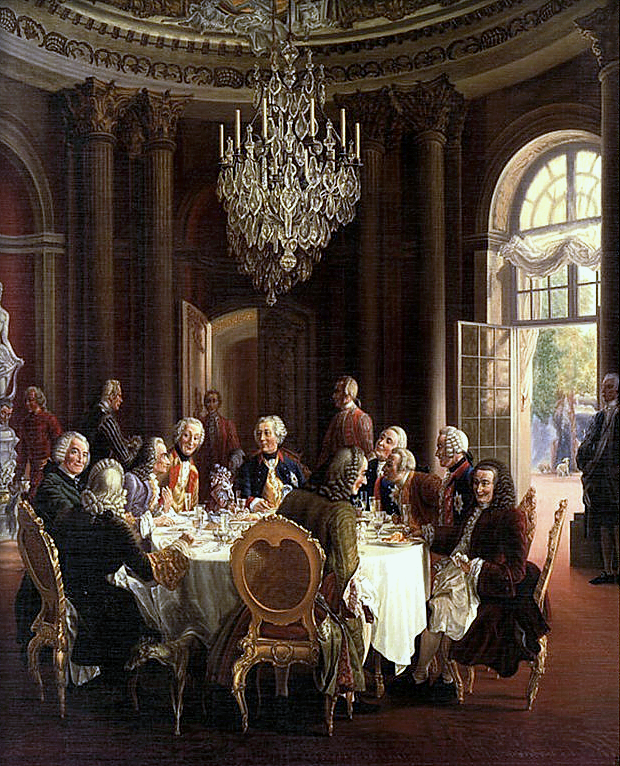
Die Tafelrunde by Menzel. The oval domed "Marble Hall" is the principal reception room of the palace. On the left side, in the purple coat, sits Voltaire; the other guests are Casanova, Marquis d'Argens, La Mettrie, the Keiths, Von Rothenburg, Von Stille and Francesco Algarotti.

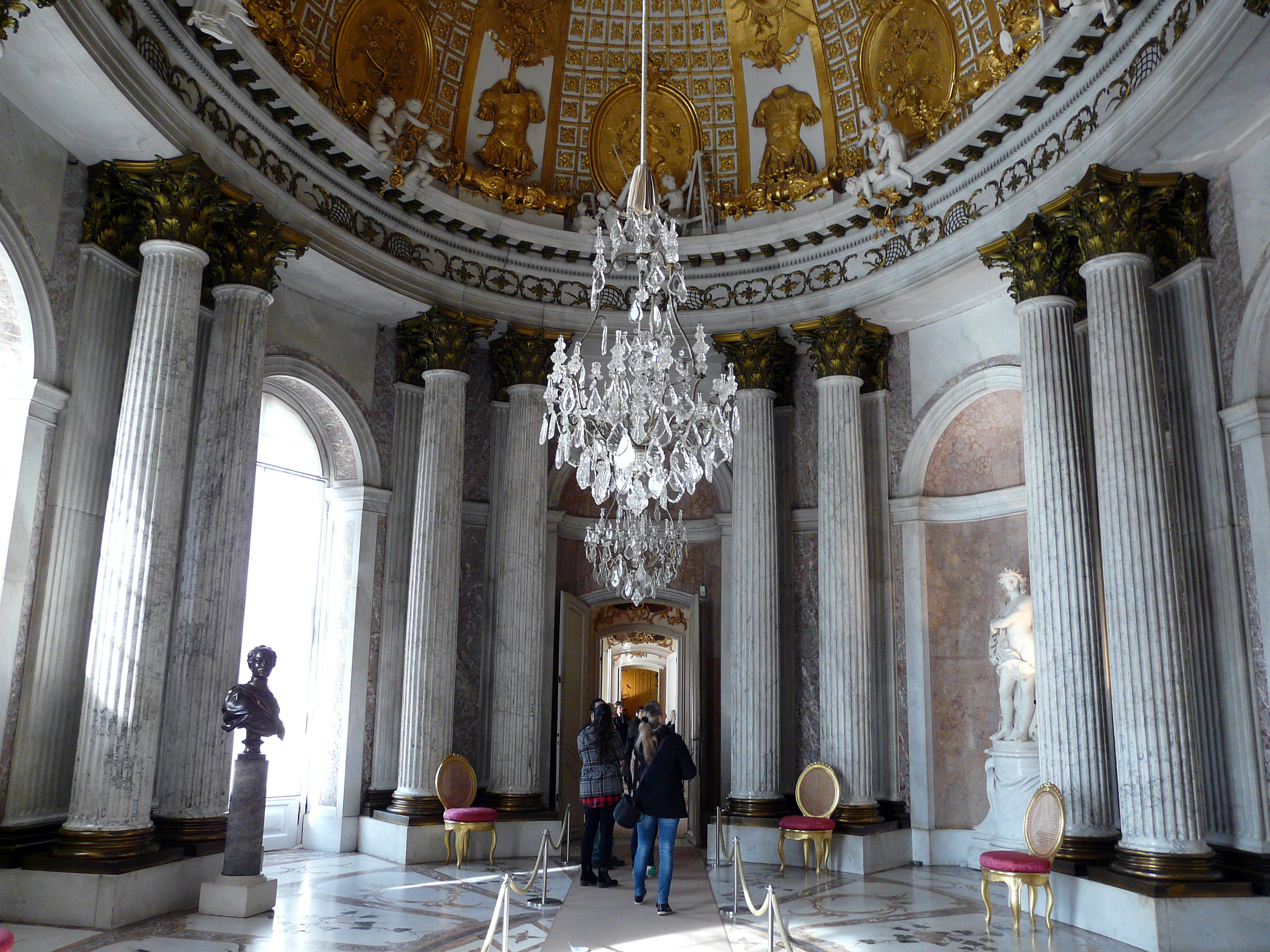
Marmorsaal ("Marble Hall")

The white-and-gold oval Marmorsaal ("Marble Hall"), as the principal reception room, was the setting for celebrations in the palace, its dome crowned by a cupola. White Carrara marble was used for the paired columns, above which stucco putti dangle their feet from the cornice. The dome is white with gilded ornament, and the floor is of Italian marble intarsia inlaid in compartments radiating from a central trelliswork oval. Three arch-headed windows face the garden; opposite them, in two niches flanking the doorway, figures of Venus Urania, the goddess of free nature and life, and Apollo, the god of the arts, by the French sculptor François Gaspard Adam, established the iconography of Sanssouci as a place where art was joined with nature.

The adjoining room served as both an audience room and the Dining Room. It is decorated with paintings by French 18th-century artists, including Jean-Baptiste Pater, Jean François de Troy, Pierre-Jacques Cazes, Louis Silvestre, and Antoine Watteau. However, here, as in the majority of the rooms, the carved putti, flowers and books on the overdoor reliefs were the work of Glume, and the ceiling paintings emphasise the rococo spirit of the palace. This exuberant form of ornamentation of rococo, Rocaille, was used in abundance on the walls and ceiling in the music room. Much of the work was by the sculptor and decorator Johann Michael Hoppenhaupt (the elder). A 1746 fortepiano by Gottfried Silbermann which once belonged to Frederick the Great remains as a nostalgic reminder of the room's original purpose.

The King's study and bedroom, remodelled after Frederick's death by Frederick William von Erdmannsdorff in 1786, is now in direct contrast to the rococo rooms. Here, the clean and plain lines of classicism now rule. However, Frederick's desk and the armchair in which he died were returned to the room in the middle of the 19th century. Portraits and once missing pieces of furniture from Frederick's time have also since been replaced.

The circular library deviated from the spatial structure of French palace architecture. The room is almost hidden, accessed through a narrow passageway from the bedroom, underlining its private character. Cedarwood was used to panel the walls and for the alcoved bookcases. The harmonious shades of brown augmented with rich gold-coloured Rocaille ornaments were intended to create a peaceful mood.

The bookcases contained approximately 2,100 volumes of Greek and Roman writings and historiographies and also a collection of French literature of the 17th and 18th centuries with a heavy emphasis on the works of Voltaire. The books were bound in brown or red goat leather and richly gilded.

The north facing gallery overlooked the forecourt. Here, again, Frederick deviated from French room design, which would have placed service rooms in this location. Recessed into the inner wall of this long room were niches containing marble sculptures of Greco-Roman deities. Five windows alternating with pier glasses on the outer wall reflect the paintings by Nicolas Lancret, Jean-Baptiste Pater and Antoine Watteau hung between the niches opposite.

To the west were the guest rooms in which were lodged those friends of the King considered intimate enough to be invited to this most private of his palaces. Two of Frederick's visitors were sufficiently distinguished and frequent that the rooms they occupied were named after them. The Rothenburg room is named after the Count of Rothenburg, who inhabited his circular room until his death in 1751. This room balances the palace architecturally with the library. The Voltaire Room was frequently occupied by the philosopher during his stay in Potsdam between 1750 and 1753. The Voltaire Room was remarkable for its decoration, which gave it the alternative name of the "Flower Room". On a yellow lacquered wall panel were superimposed, colourful, richly adorned wood carvings. Apes, parrots, cranes, storks, fruits, flowers, garlands gave the room a cheerful and natural character. Johann Christian Hoppenhaupt (the younger) designed the room between 1752 and 1753 from sketches made by Frederick.

== The terraced gardens ==
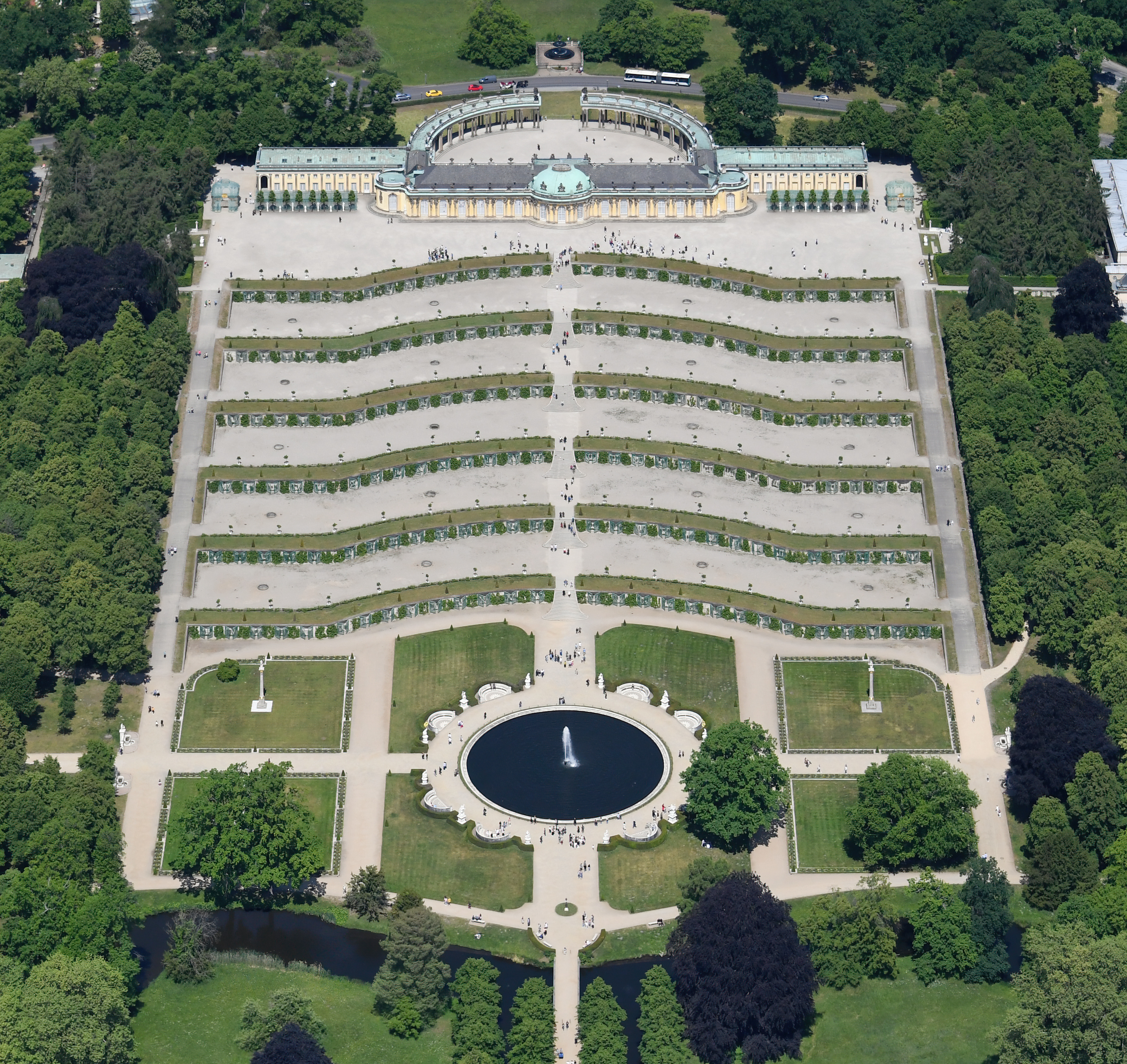
Aerial view of Sanssouci and its terraced gardens

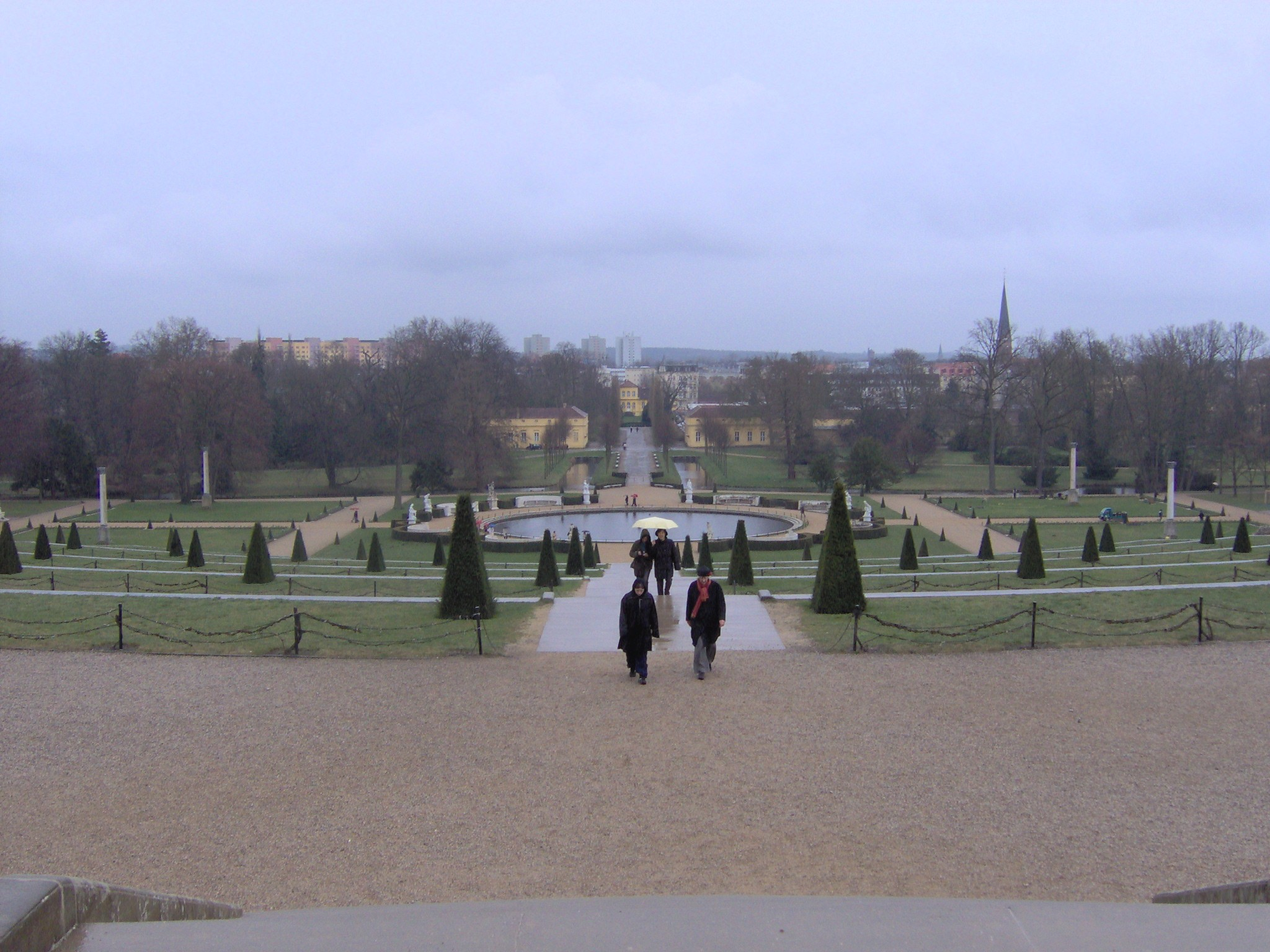
The terrace gardens, looking down from the palace, towards the park

The panoramic vista of the garden of Sanssouci is the result of Frederick the Great's decision to create a terraced vineyard on the south slope of the hills of Bornstedt. The area had previously been wooded, but the trees were felled during the reign of the "soldier-king" Frederick William I to allow the city of Potsdam to expand.

On 10 August 1744, Frederick ordered the bare hillside to be transformed into terraced vineyards. Three wide terraces were created, with convex centres to maximise the sun light (see plan). On the partitions of the supporting walls, the brickwork is pierced by 168 glazed niches. Trellised vines from Portugal, Italy, France, and also from nearby Neuruppin, were planted against the brickwork, while figs grew in the niches. The individual parts of the terrace were further divided by strips of lawn, on which were planted yew trees. Low box hedging surrounded trellised fruit, making a circular ornamental parterre. In the middle of this "wheel", 120 steps (now 132) led downward further dividing the terraces into six.

Below the hill, a Baroque ornamental garden, modelled on the parterre at Versailles, was constructed in 1745. The Great Fountain was built at the centre of this garden in 1748. Frederick never saw the fountain playing because the engineers employed in the construction had little understanding of the hydraulics involved. From 1750, marble statues were placed around the basin of the fountain. This again was a feature copied from Versailles: figures of Venus, Mercury, Apollo, Diana, Juno, Jupiter, Mars and Minerva, as well as allegorical portrayals of the four elements Fire, Water, Air and Earth. Venus and Mercury, the works of the sculptor Jean Baptiste Pigalle, and two groups of hunters, allegories of the elements (wind and water) by Lambert Sigisbert Adam, were presented by Versailles's owner, the French King Louis XV. The remaining figures came from the workshop of François Gaspard Adam, a renowned sculptor in Berlin. By 1764, the French Rondel, as it came to be known, was completed.

Nearby was a kitchen garden, which Frederick William I had laid out sometime prior to 1715. The Soldier King jokingly gave this simple garden the name "My Marly", in reference to the very similar garden at the summer residence of Louis XIV in Marly-le-Roi.

In his plans for the grounds, Frederick attached great importance on the combination of both an ornamental and a practical garden, thus demonstrating his belief that art and nature should be united.

== The Park ==
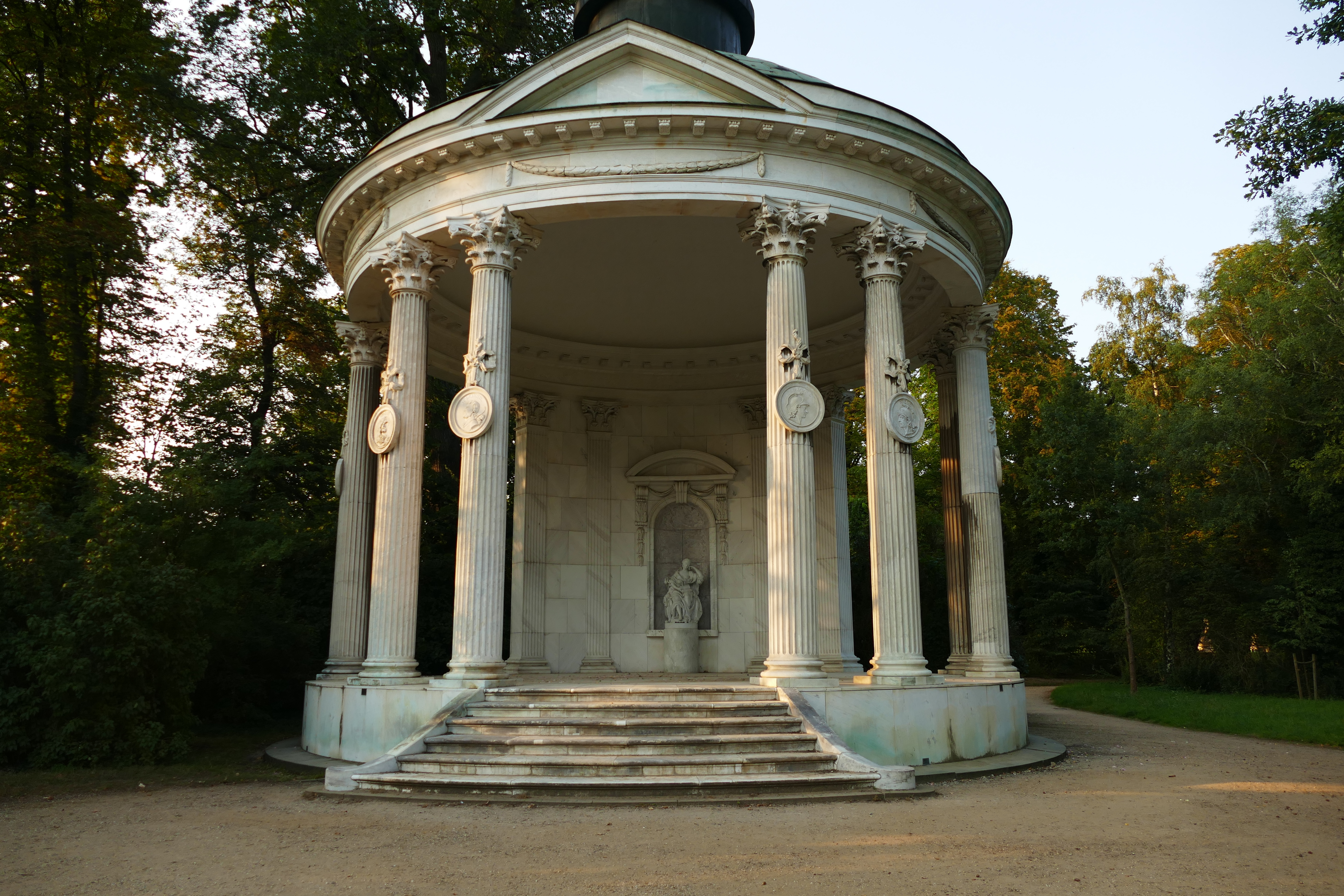
The Temple of Friendship: constructed south of the main avenue from 1768 to 1770 by Carl von Gontard in memory of Frederick the Great's favourite sister, Margravine Wilhelmine of Bayreuth. The building complements the Antique Temple, which lies due north of the alley.

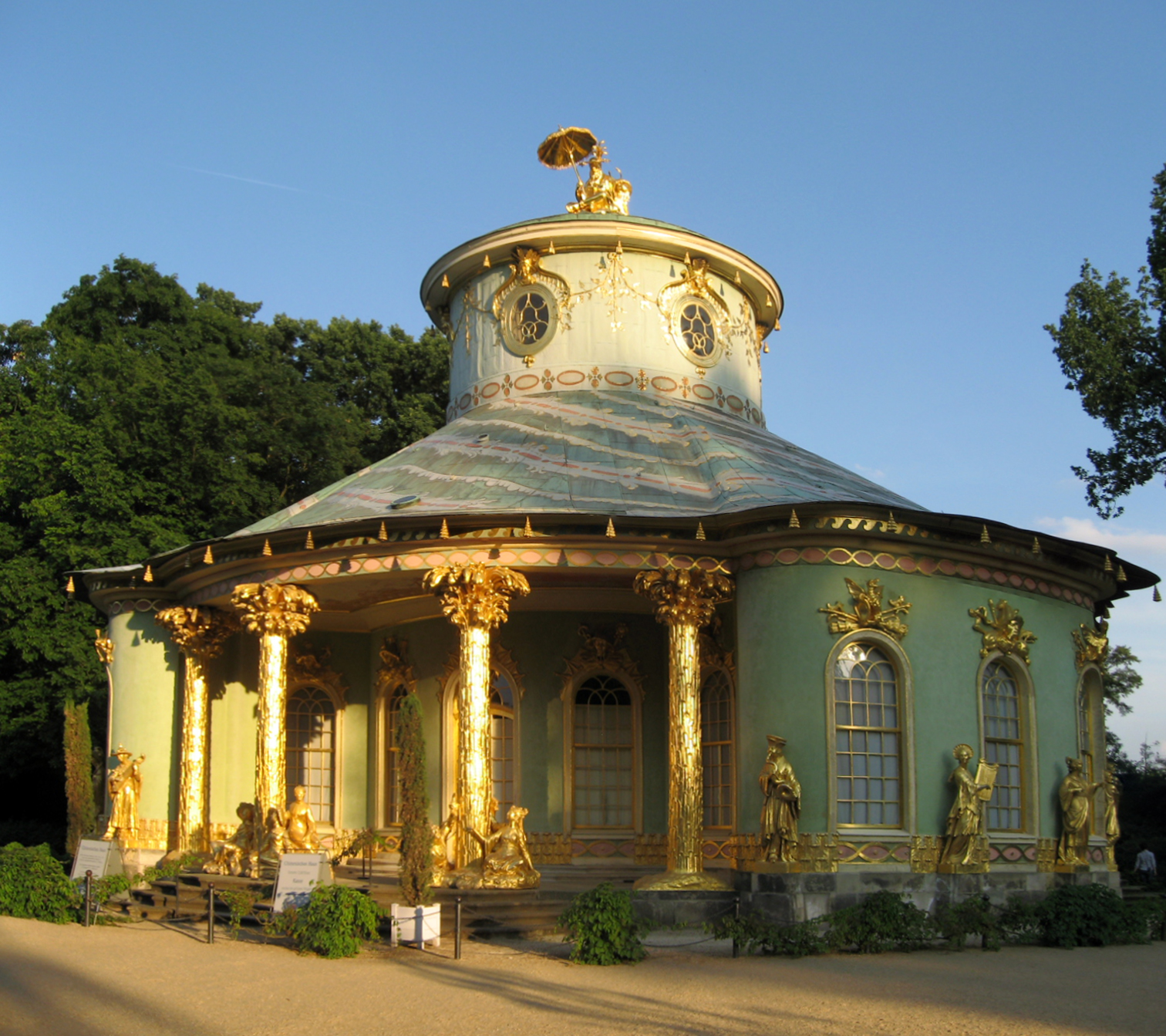
The Chinese House, designed by Johann Gottfried Büring between 1755 and 1764; a pavilion in the Chinoiserie style: a mixture of rococo elements coupled with Oriental architecture.

Following the terracing of the vineyard and the completion of the palace, Frederick turned his attention to the landscaping of the greater vicinity of the palace and thus began the creation of Sanssouci Park. In his organisation of the park, Frederick continued what he had begun in Neuruppin and Rheinsberg. A straight main avenue was laid out, ultimately 2.5 km long, beginning in the east at the 1748 obelisk and extended over the years to the New Palace, which marks its western end.

Continuing the horticultural theme of the terraced gardens, 3,000 fruit trees were planted in the park, and greenhouses and nurseries laid out, producing oranges, melons, peaches and bananas. Statuary and obelisks were also erected, with representations of the goddesses Flora and Pomona. Frederick had several temples and follies erected in the same rococo style as the palace itself. Some were small houses which compensated for the lack of reception rooms in the palace itself.

Frederick invested heavily in a vain attempt to introduce a fountain system in Sanssouci Park, attempting to emulate the other great Baroque gardens of Europe. Hydraulics at this stage were still in their infancy, and despite the building of pumping houses and reservoirs, the fountains at Sanssouci remained silent and still for the next 100 years. The invention of steam power solved the problems a century later, and thus the reservoir finally fulfilled its purpose. From around 1842, the Prussian Royal family were finally able to marvel at such features as the Great Fountain below the vineyard terraces, shooting jets of water to a height of 38 metres. The pumping station itself became another garden pavilion, disguised as a Turkish mosque, with its chimney becoming a minaret.

The park was expanded under Frederick William III, and later under his son Frederick William IV. The architects Karl Friedrich Schinkel and Ludwig Persius built Charlottenhof Palace in the park on the site of a former farm house, and Peter Joseph Lenné was commissioned with the garden design. Broad meadows created visual avenues between Charlottenhof, the Roman Baths and the New Palace, and incorporated the follies such as the Temple of Friendship of Frederick the Great.

== History after World War I ==
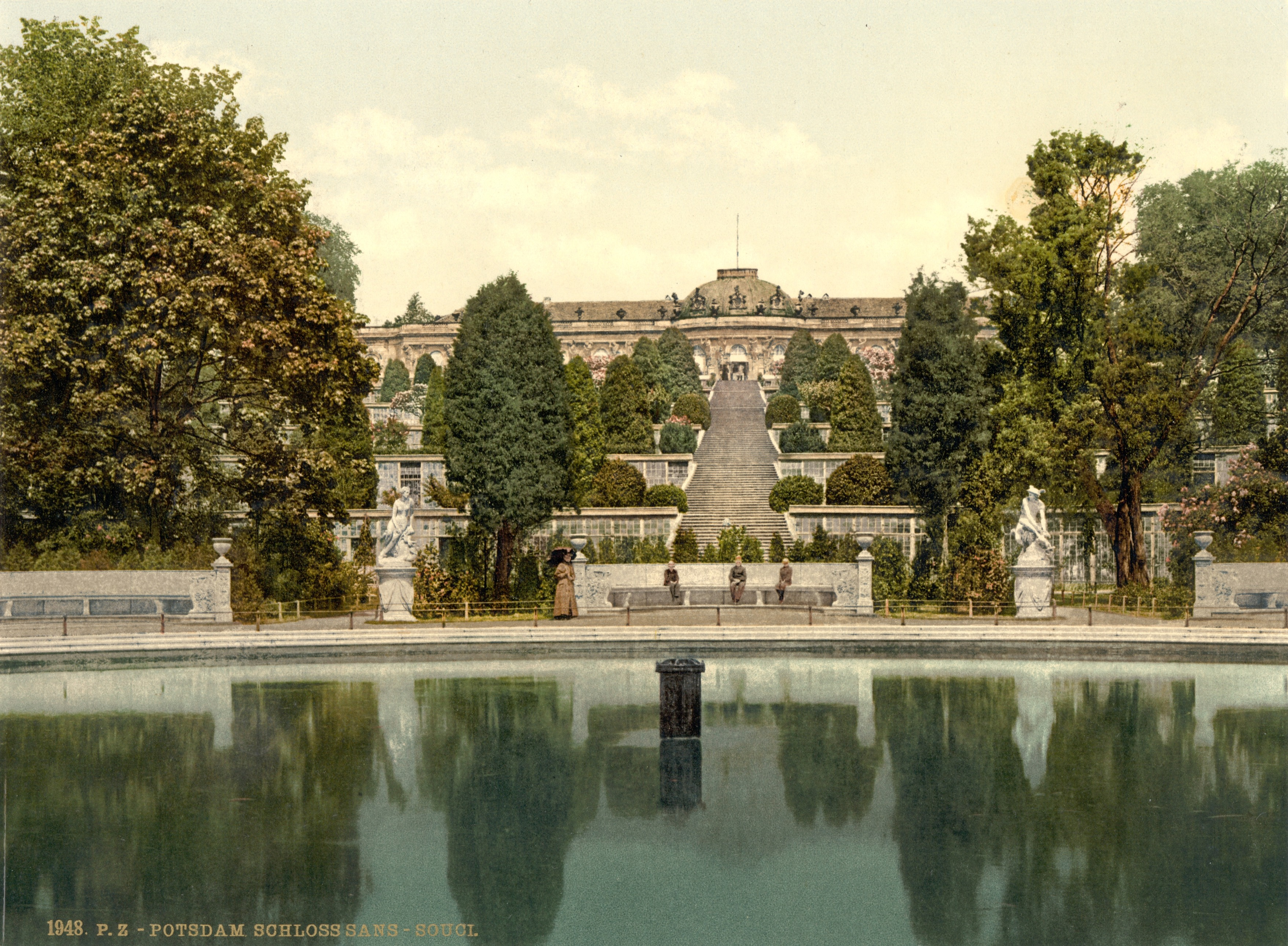
Sanssouci around 1900; since then the flagpole and central bench have gone, and most of the trees; compare above right

After the First World War, and despite the end of the German monarchy, the palace remained in the possession of the Hohenzollern dynasty. It eventually came under the protection of the Prussian "Verwaltung der Staatlichen Schlösser und Gärten" (Administration of National Palaces and Gardens) on 1 April 1927.

When air raids on Berlin began in the Second World War, the most notable works of art of the former imperial palaces were transferred for safety to Rheinsberg (Brandenburg) and Bernterode (near Worbis, Thuringia). The structure of the palace remained unscathed despite fierce fighting in the vicinity in 1945, but the ancient windmill, retained in the park by Frederick to add rustic charm, was destroyed.

Following the end of the war, most of the items that had been moved to Rheinsberg were transferred as booty to the Soviet Union; only a small fraction were returned to the palace in 1958. The artistic pieces from Bernterode found by American soldiers were first shipped to Wiesbaden to the "Central Art Collecting Point" and in 1957 went to Charlottenburg palace in West Berlin.

Compared to many similar buildings, the palace fared well during almost 50 years under Communist jurisdiction in East Germany. The Church of St. Saviour in Sacrow and the centre of Potsdam were neglected, and some of the historic centre of Potsdam was demolished. The City Palace, Potsdam, containing architectural work by Knobelsdorff was demolished in 1960, but Sanssouci survived unscathed and the East German government endeavoured to have Sanssouci placed on the list of World Heritage Sites. This was achieved in 1990 with the following citation:

The palace and park of Sanssouci, often described as the "Prussian Versailles", are a synthesis of the artistic movements of the 18th century in the cities and courts of Europe. That ensemble is a unique example of the architectural creations and landscape design against the backdrop of the intellectual background of monarchic ideas of the state.

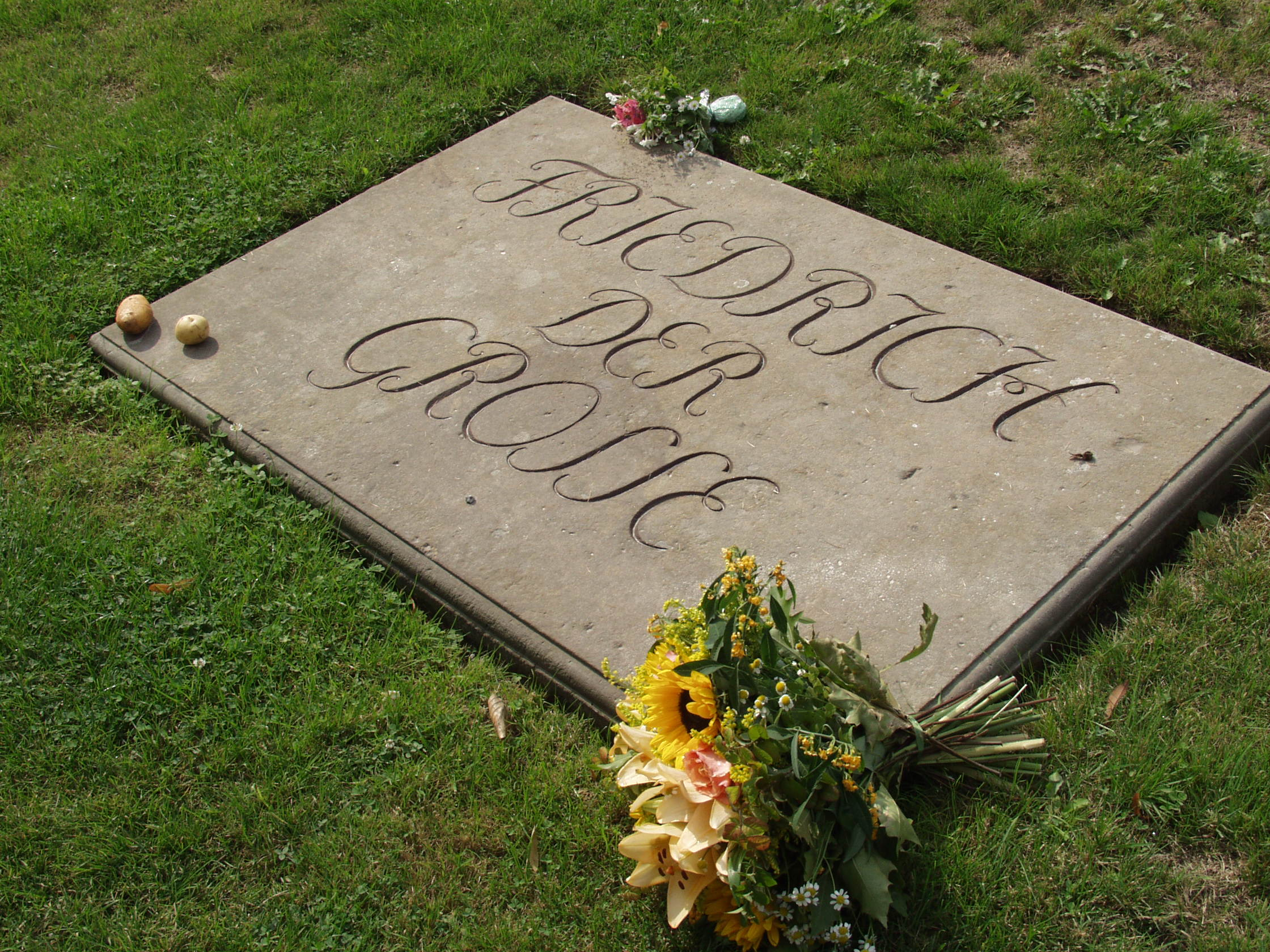
Frederick the Great's grave, Sanssouci

In 1991, following German reunification, Frederick's casket was interred in the terrace of the vineyard of Sanssouci – in the still existing crypt he had built there – after dark, without pomp, in accordance with his will.

The library of Frederick was returned in 1992 to its former home at Sanssouci. Thirty-six oil paintings followed between 1993 and 1995. In 1995, the Foundation of Prussian Palaces and Gardens in Berlin-Brandenburg was formed. The organisation's job is to administer and care for Sanssouci and the other former royal palaces in Berlin and Brandenburg.

== In popular culture ==
The Canadian songwriter, Rufus Wainwright, included a song titled "Sanssouci" on his 2007 album Release the Stars. It is about a beautiful palace in Germany.

== See also ==
- Palaces and Parks of Potsdam and Berlin
- List of Baroque residences
- List of sights of Potsdam
