= Claude Michel =

Sculptor from France

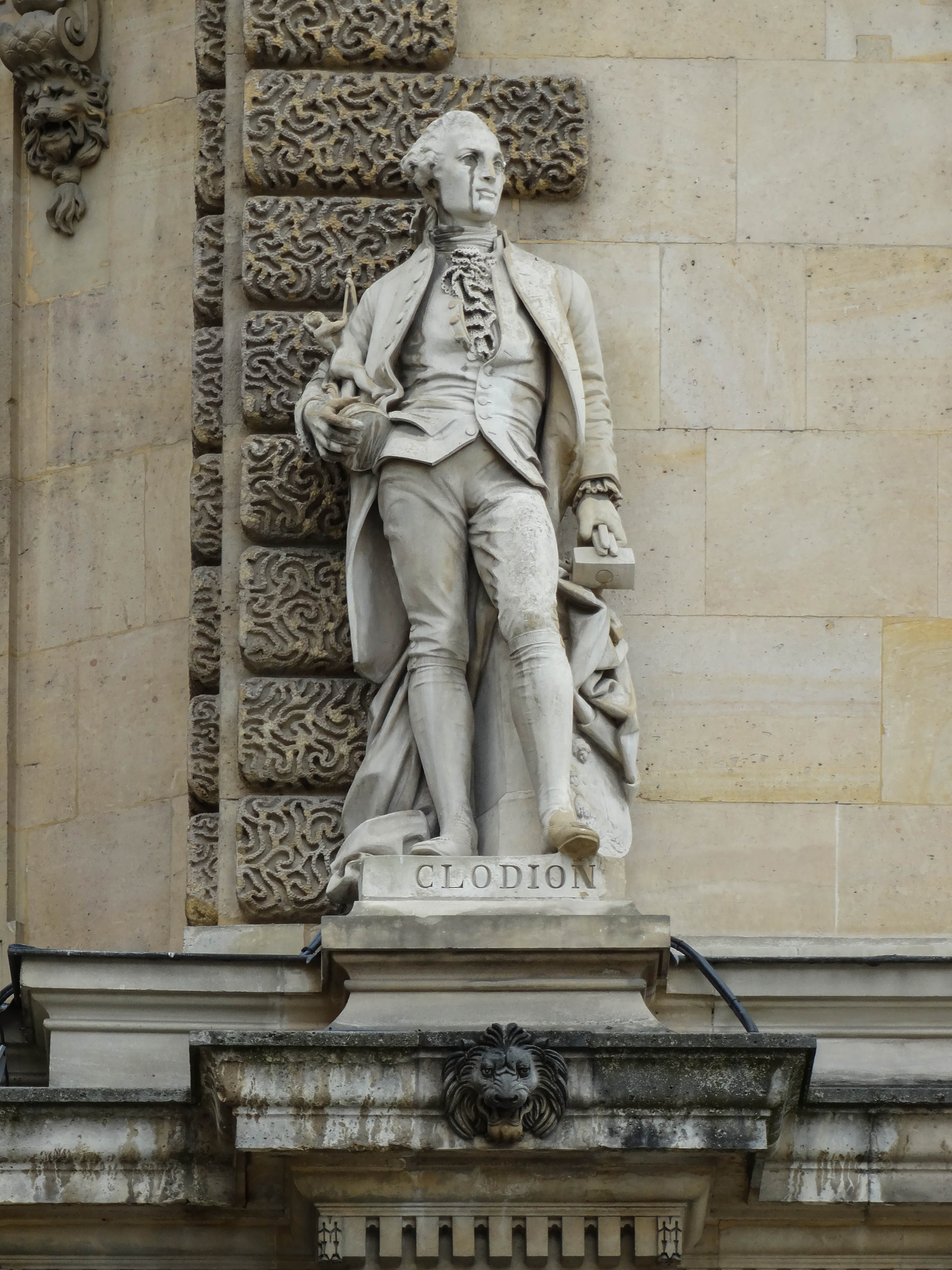
- Statue of Clodion by Vital Gabriel Dubray
- Born: 20 December 1738
- Died: 29 March 1814 (aged 75)
- Known for: Sculpting, mainly terracotta
- Style: Rococo
- Spouse: Flore Pajou (1781–1794)

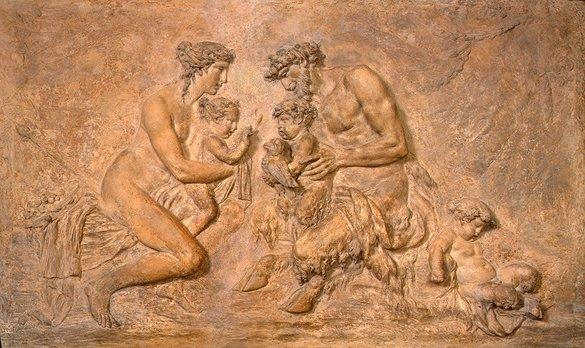
Faun Family, terracotta relief by Claude Michel, c. 1785, National Gallery of Art, Washington, D. C.

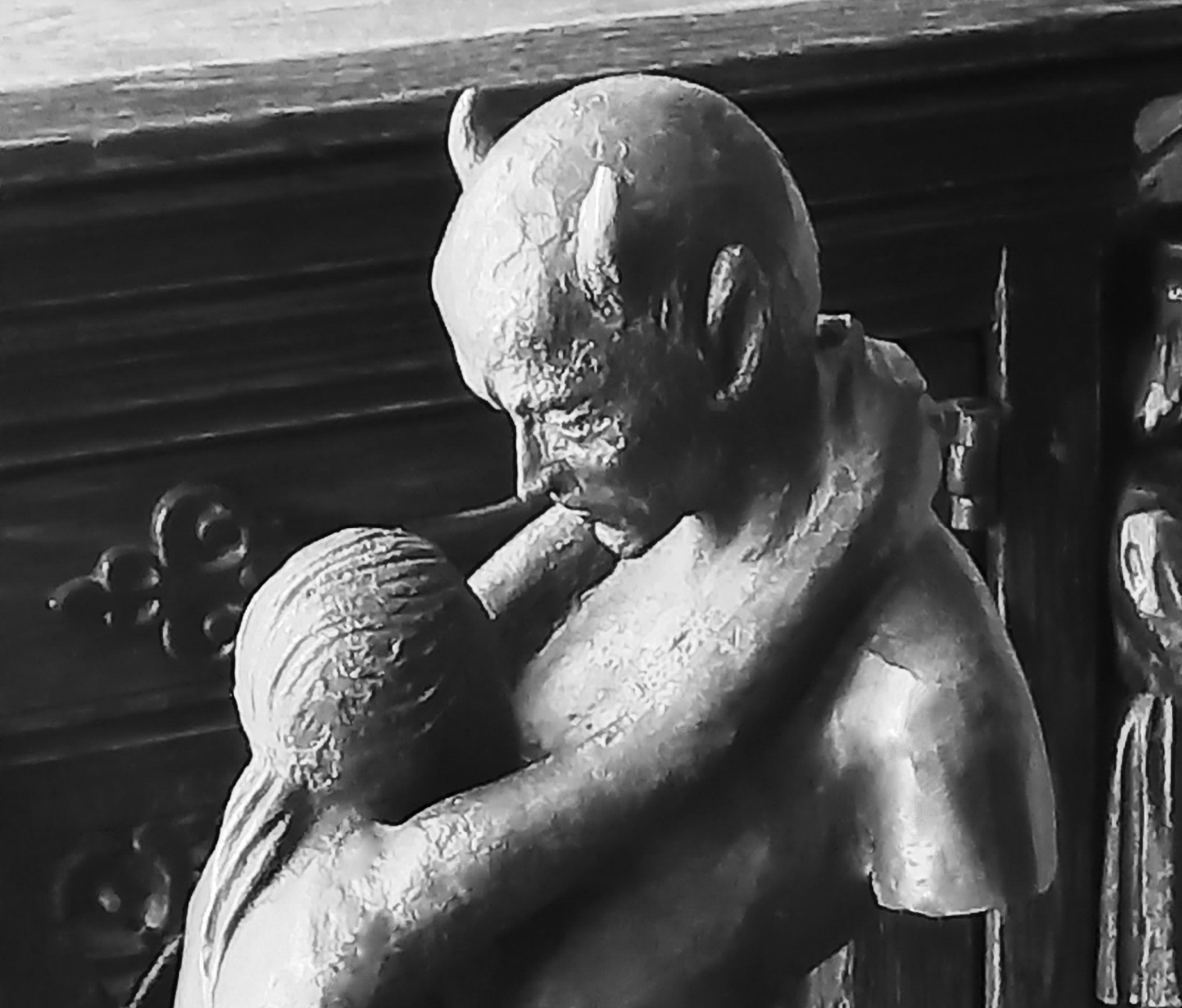
SATYR & NUDE Bronze Sculpture by Claude Michel, bronze on marble base 1798-1802 Paris, France

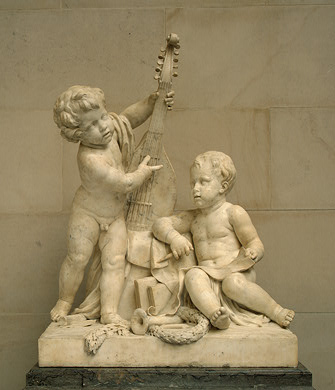
Poetry and Music, marble sculpture by Claude Michel, 1774-1778, National Gallery of Art, Washington, D. C.

Claude Michel (20 December 1738 – 29 March 1814), known as Clodion, was a French sculptor in the Rococo style, especially noted for his works in marble, bronze, & terracotta.

== Life ==
He was born in Nancy to Anne Adam and Thomas Michel, an undistinguished sculptor. Anne was the sister of sculptors Lambert-Sigisbert Adam and Francois Gaspard Adam. In Nancy and probably in Lille he spent the earlier years of his life. In 1755 he came to Paris and entered the workshop of his maternal uncle Lambert-Sigisbert Adam, an established sculptor. He remained four years in this workshop, and on his death became a pupil of Jean-Baptiste Pigalle. In 1759 he won the grand prize for sculpture at the Académie Royale. In 1761 he earned the first silver medal for studies from models. In 1762 he went to Rome, where his activity was considerable between 1767 and 1771.

Catherine II of Russia was eager to secure his presence in St Petersburg, but he returned to Paris. Among his patrons, which were very numerous, were the chapter of Rouen, the states of Languedoc, and the director generale. His works were frequently exhibited at the Salon. In 1782 he married Catherine Flore, a daughter of the sculptor Augustin Pajou, who subsequently obtained a divorce from him. The agitation caused by the French Revolution drove Clodion in 1792 to Nancy, where he remained until 1798, His energies being spent in the decoration of houses.

Among Clodion's works are a statue of Montesquieu, a Dying Cleopatra, and a chimneypiece at present in the Victoria and Albert Museum in London. In 1782, he realized the decoration for the nymphaeum of the Hôtel de Besenval. His 1788 work Dance of Time is in the Frick Collection in New York. Another known sculpture is called "The Intoxication of Wine". One of his last groups represented Homer as a beggar being driven away by fishermen (1810). Clodion died in Paris, on the eve of the invasion of Paris by the forces of the Sixth Coalition.

== Works ==
Among the public collections holding works by Claude Michel are:

- Art Institute of Chicago
- Bowes Museum (County Durham, UK)
- Carnegie Museum of Art (Pittsburgh, Pennsylvania)
- Cleveland Museum of Art
- Courtauld Institute of Art (London)
- Currier Museum of Art (New Hampshire)
- Detroit Institute of Arts
- Fine Arts Museums of San Francisco
- Getty Museum (Los Angeles)
- Honolulu Museum of Art
- Kimbell Art Museum (Fort Worth, Texas)
- Kunstindeks Danmark
- Louvre (Paris)
- Metropolitan Museum of Art
- Musée Cognacq-Jay (Paris)
- Museum of Fine Arts, Boston
- Musée des beaux-arts de Bordeaux
- Museum Boijmans Van Beuningen (Rotterdam)
- National Museum of Art (Cluj-Napoca)
- National Gallery of Armenia
- National Gallery of Art (Washington D.C.)
- Nationalmuseum, Stockholm
- Norton Simon Museum (Pasadena, California)
- Philadelphia Museum of Art
- Pushkin State Museum of Fine Arts (Moscow, Russia)

== See also ==
- Neoclassicism in France
