= Friedrich Christian Glume =

German artist

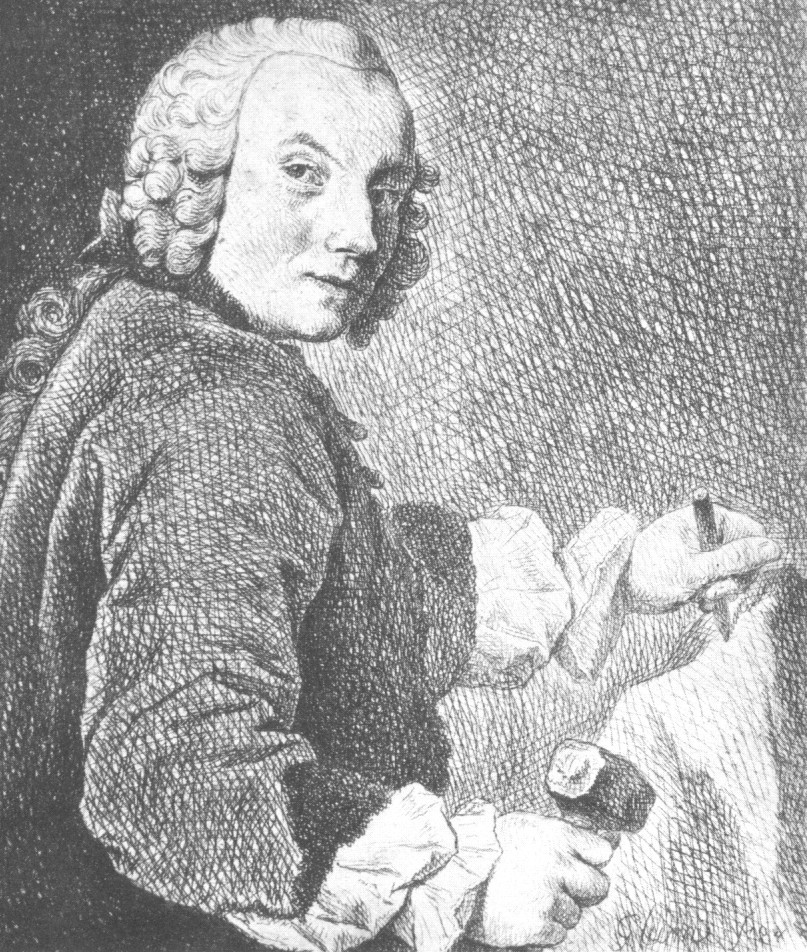
Friedrich Christian Glume.

Friedrich Christian Glume (25 March 1714 – 6 April 1752) was a German artist active during the reign of Frederick II of Prussia. The sculptural decorations above the entrance doors of Sanssouci were created by him.
