= Georg Franz Ebenhech =

German sculptor

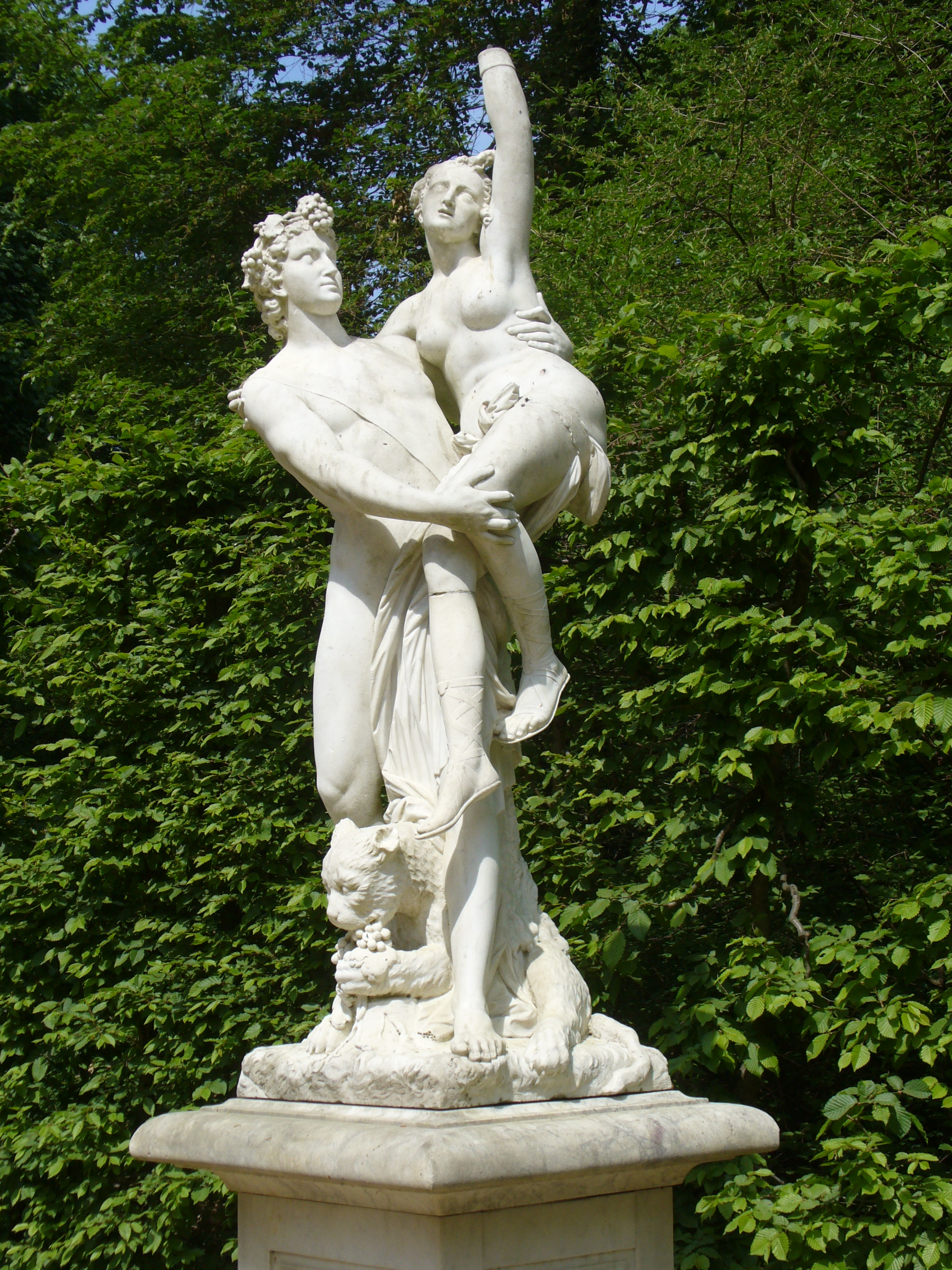
Bacchus abducting Ariadne (c.1750) in the garden of Sanssouci

Georg Franz Ebenhech (or Ebenhecht) (c. 1710–February 21, 1757) was a German sculptor known for his mastery of marble technique.

Little is known of Ebenhech's early life before he arrived at Berlin, but it is believed that he had previously worked in Italy, Leipzig, and Dresden. Most of his work was created in Prussia for Sanssouci Palace, Potsdam, and he became an honorary member of the Prussian Academy of Arts in 1751. Ebenhech was still working on commissions for Sanssouci when he died in Berlin in 1757.

One of Ebenhech's notable works is a life-size sculpture of Neptune, created with Johann Peter Benckert, on display in the Park Sanssouci in Potsdam, Germany.
