= François Gaspard Adam =

French sculptor

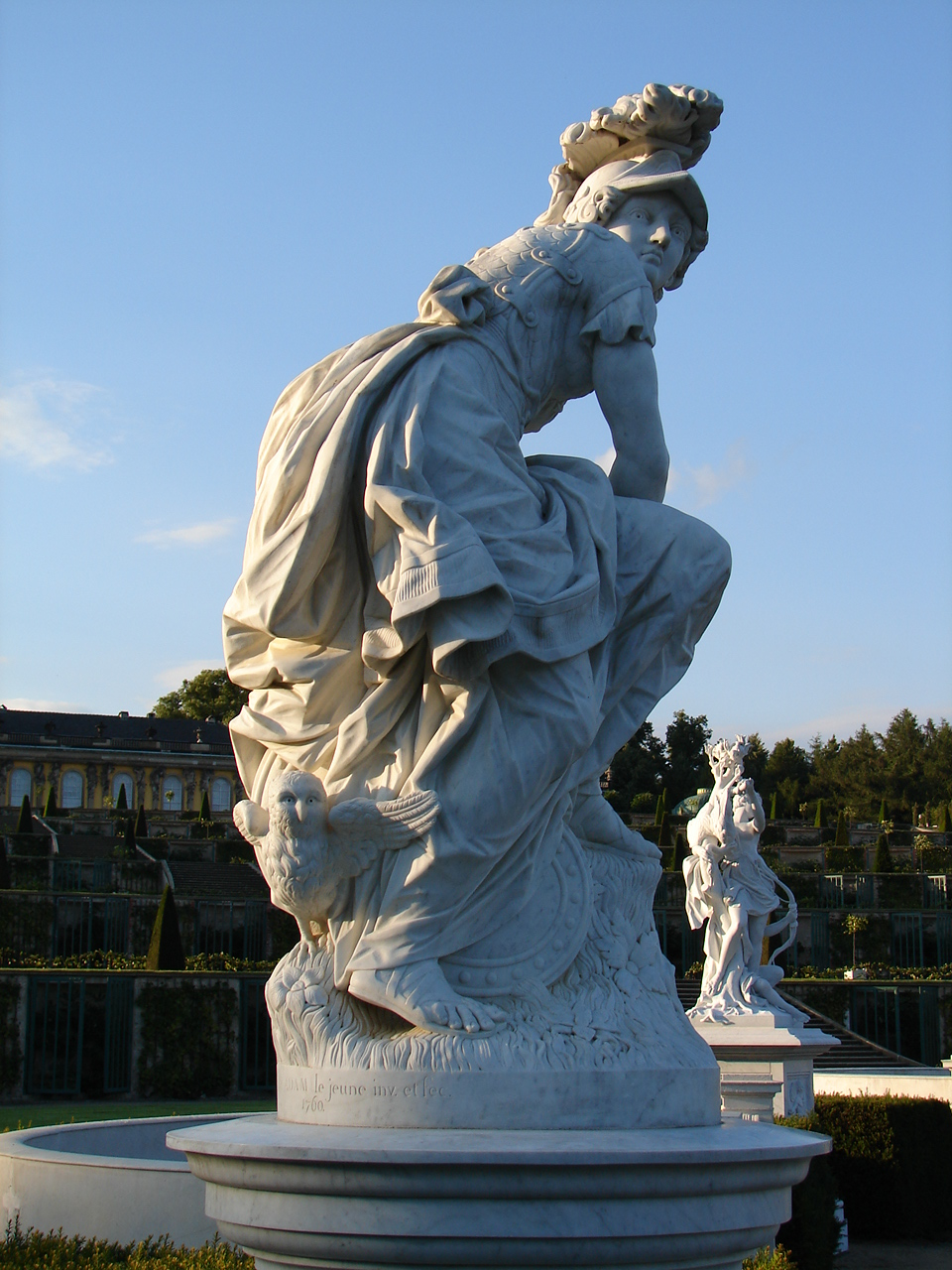
François Gaspard Adam, Minerva

François Gaspard Adam (23 May 1710 – 18 August 1761) was a French rococo sculptor.

A member of the Adam family of painters, François was born at Nancy, and studied under his father, Jacob-Sigisbert. He later followed his two brothers to Rome in 1730, before moving to Paris. In 1740, he took second in the Prix de Rome competition, but later won the contest and returned to Rome in 1742 to study at the Académie de France's campus there. From 1747 to 1760, Adam was the principal sculptor of Frederick the Great of Prussia. Most of his work decorates the grounds at Frederick's Sanssouci Palace in Potsdam. He died in Paris.

== Life and work ==
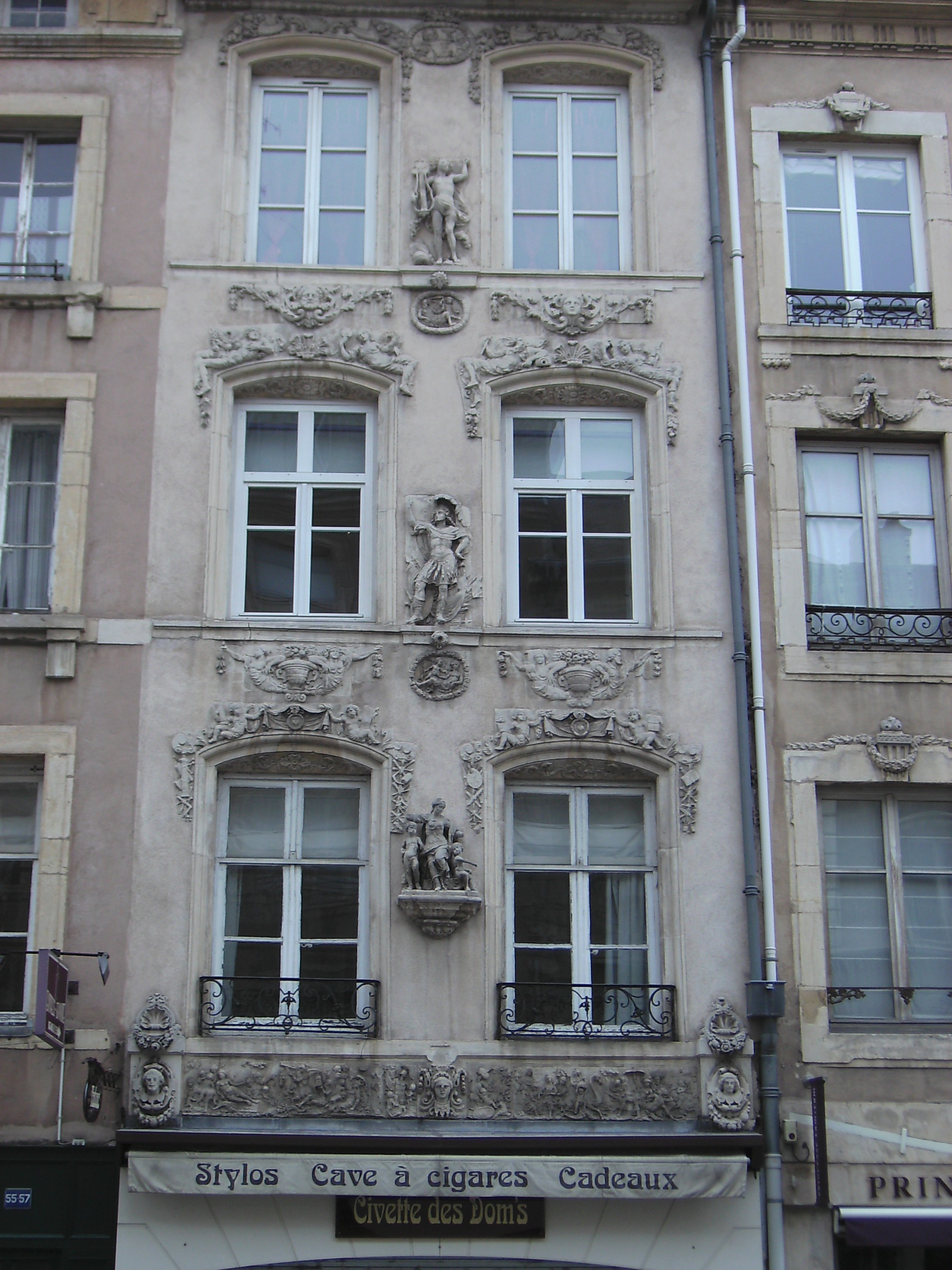
Birthplace of François Gaspard Adam. 57, rue des Dominicains, Nancy

François Gaspard Adam, who came from a family of sculptors, was born in 1710 as the youngest son of the French sculptor Jacob-Sigisbert Adam and his wife Sébastienne Le Léal in the parish of Saint-Sébastien in Nancy. He received his artistic training in his father's workshop until 1729. For further education he followed his brothers Lambert-Sigisbert Adam and Nicolas Sébastien to Rome, where he arrived in 1730. There he probably studied ancient sculptures from the private collection of the cardinal Polignac, which his brother Lambert-Sigisbert restored and added to.

In January 1733, François Gaspard and Lambert-Sigisbert, after a brief stay in Nancy in Lorraine, went to Paris. In 1740 he received second prize for a sculpture in the competition Prix de Rome of the Académie royale de peinture et de sculpture and in 1741 he received first prize with a Rome grant for a bas-relief depicting the healing of Tobias. ' represented. As a scholarship holder he attended the Académie de France à Rome for four years from 1742 and was awarded the title of professor by the Accademia di Belle Arti in Florence on his return journey to France in 1746 .

After a short stay in Paris, Adam entered the service of the Prussian king Frederick II in 1747 through the mediation of Marquis d'Argens, who appointed him the first court sculptor and put him in charge of the French sculpture studio in Berlin. The studio set up in a former garden house in Berlin. The Lustgarten was established by the king specifically for the production of marble sculptures. His first commissioned works were the marble sculptures "Venus Urania" and "Apollon" created in 1748 for the marble hall of the newly built Potsdam summer palace Sanssouci. In 1749 the "Flora with Zephyr" was created for the uppermost vineyard terrace of Sanssouci, which a year later the "Cleopatra mourning Amor” followed. He was also involved in the furnishing of the "French Rondells" in the adjoining south Parterre, for which he created marble figures and bas-reliefs. In 1751 he was made an honorary member of the Royal Prussian Academy of Arts and Mechanical Sciences, Section for Fine Arts.

In 1759 François Gaspard Adam left Prussia and returned to Paris, although he had not completed all the commissioned work. His nephew Sigisbert François Michel executed some of the works, such as the “Mars” in the “French Rondell”, the bust of the legal reformer Samuel von Cocceji for the Berlin Court of Appeal and the statue of the Field Marshal Kurt Christoph von Schwerin for the Wilhelmplatz in Berlin.

== Bibliography ==
- Peter Bloch, Waldemar Grzimek: Die Berliner Bildhauerschule im neunzehnten Jahrhundert. Das klassische Berlin. Revised edition. Gebr. Mann, Berlin 1994, ISBN 3-7861-1767-5.
- Peter Bloch: Ethos & Pathos. Die Berliner Bildhauerschule 1786–1914. 2 volumes (catalogue and accompanying volume).. Gebr. Mann, Berlin 1990, ISBN 3-7861-1599-0 (On the exhibition, Berlin, Hamburger Bahnhof, 19 May to 29 July 1990).
- Eberhard Ruhmer, Adam, François Gaspard Balthasar, ISBN 3-428-00182-6
- Stanislas Lami, Adam, François Gaspard Balthasar Ulrich Thieme, Felix Becker (Hrsg.): Allgemeines Lexikon der Bildenden Künstler von der Antike bis zur Gegenwart. Edited by Ulrich Thieme und Felix Becker. Volume 1, page61
