= Dance of Time (Clodion) =

1788 clock with sculpture by Clodion

The Dance of Time
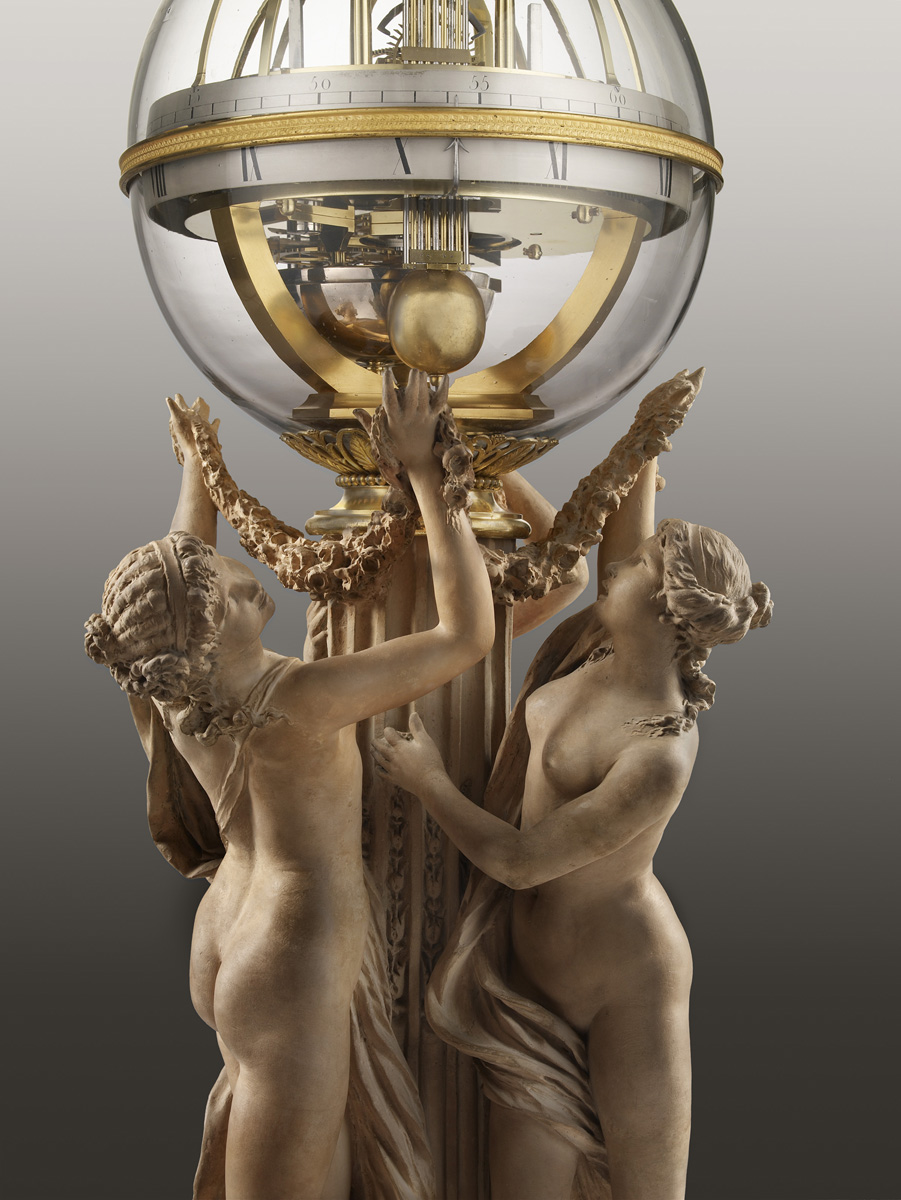
- Artists: Sculptor: Claude Michel, known as Clodion (1738–1814); Clockmaker: Jean-Baptiste Lepaute (1727–1802)
- Year: 1788
- Medium: Terracotta, brass, gilt brass, silvered brass, steel, and glass
- Dimensions: 40 3/4 in. (103.5 cm)
- Location: Frick Collection, New York City
- Website: Museum webpage

The Dance of Time: Three Nymphs Supporting a Clock is a work by the French sculptor Claude Michel (1738–1814), known as Clodion. Executed in 1788, it includes three terracotta female figures, frequently described as nymphs, dancing around a column that supports a pendulum clock with rotating annular dial by Jean-Baptiste Lepaute (1727–1802), the younger brother of Jean-André Lepaute. It is the only eighteenth-century clock featuring a terracotta sculpture as a completed work of art known to scholars.

== Iconography ==
Clodion may have been influenced by Poussin's painting, A Dance to the Music of Time, which was executed between 1634 and 1636 for Giulio Rospigliosi, the future Clement IX, and features figures personifying the hours, the seasons, and the fortunes of mankind. According to the seventeenth-century art critic and biographer Gian Pietro Bellori, the patron was primarily responsible for formulating the iconography of this painting, which reflects on the cycles of life through the representation of the passage of time. Although the painting remained in the Rospigliosi family until 1713, the composition was well known through prints and painted copies. The painting eventually passed through the collection of Cardinal Fesch, uncle of Napoleon Bonaparte, sometime after 1713 and appears to have been in France until 1845. Another source for Clodion's sculpture may have been a Roman copy of a Hellenistic marble group known as the Three Nymphs, which is presently in the collection of the Louvre. Thus, the three graceful figures could represent nymphs, the Three Graces, or the Horae–female deities personifying the passage of time. It is also possible that the dancing maidens were meant to evoke all of these associations while, as one specialist in eighteenth-century sculpture has noted, playing on the theme of the caryatid.

== Acquisition ==
The work was acquired in 2006 by the Frick Collection in New York City with funds provided by the late Winthrop Kellogg Edey (1938–1999), an American connoisseur and collector of clocks and watches, and a leading scholar on horology. The Winthrop Edey Bequest includes a collection of twenty-five clocks, fourteen watches, and a reference library relating to the history of time measurement.

== Exhibition ==
- "The Art of the Timekeeper." November, 2001-February, 2002.
- "Precision and Splendor: Clocks and Watches at the Frick Collection." 2013.
- "Enlightenment and Beauty: Sculptures by Houdon and Clodion." 2014-2015.
