= Adam (surname) =

Adam is a surname.

The surname Adam is most prevalent in Sudan, and has the most bearer density in Maldives.

== People with the surname ==
- Adolphe Adam (1803–1856), French composer and music critic
- Aimé Adam (1913–2009), Canadian politician
- Albrecht Adam (1786–1862), German painter
- André Adam (1911–1991), French sociologist
- André Adam (1936–2016), Belgian-French diplomat
- Benno Adam (1812–1892), German painter
- Bidwell Adam (1894–1982), American politician
- Brian Adam (1948–2013), Member of the Scottish Parliament
- Charles Adam (1780–1853), British naval officer
- Charlie Adam (footballer, born 1962) (1962–2012), Scottish football player
- Charlie Adam (born 1985), Scottish football player
- Corinna Adam (1937–2012), British journalist
- Dietrich Adam (1953–2020), German television actor
- Emil Adam (1843–1924), German painter
- Eugen Adam (1817–1880), German painter
- François Gaspard Adam (1710–1761), French sculptor
- Franz Adam (1815–1886), German painter
- Frederick Adam (1781–1853), Scottish major-general
- Georgina Adam (fl. 2010s–2020s), British art market journalist
- Germanos Adam (1725–1809), Melkite Catholic bishop and Christian theologian
- Gordon Adam (born 1934), British mining engineer and Labour Party politician
- Graeme Mercer Adam (1839–1912), Canadian author, editor, and publisher
- Grant Adam (born 1991), Scottish football player
- Ebenezer Adam (1919–2011), Ghanaian politician
- Hans Ritter von Adam (1886–1917), German flying ace
- Heinrich Adam (1787–1862), German painter
- Helen Adam (1909–1993), Scottish-American poet
- Ioan Adam (1875–1911), Romanian writer
- Jacob Adam (1748–1811), Austrian copper etcher
- James Adam (architect) (1732–1794), Scottish architect, brother of Robert Adam
- James Adam (classicist) (1860–1907), Scottish Classics scholar
- Jason Adam (born 1991), American baseball player
- Jean Adam (1704–1765), Scottish poet
- Jenő Ádám (1896–1982), Hungarian composer and music educator
- Johann Friedrich Adam (died 1806), Russian botanist, later called Michael Friedrich Adams
- John Adam (actor) (fl. 1970s–2020s), Australian actor
- John Adam (architect) (1721–1792), one of the Adam Brothers, Scottish 18th century architects
- John Adam (hoax), the name given by Islamic militants to a U.S. soldier they claimed to have captured in 2005
- John Adam (India) (1779–1825), British administrator, acting governor-general of the British East India Company
- John Adam (rugby league) (born 1955), Australian rugby league player and inaugural head of the players union
- Jonathan Adam (born 1984), British racing driver
- Juliette Adam (1836–1936), French writer
- Julius Adam (1852–1913), German painter
- Jumaat Haji Adam (born 1956), botanist
- Karen Adam (born 1975), Scottish politician
- Karl Adam (theologian) (1876–1966), German Catholic theologian
- Karl Adam (rowing coach) (1912–1976), German rowing coach
- Karl Adam (footballer) (1924–1999), German football player
- Ken Adam (1921–2016), British production designer
- Kenneth Adam (1908–1978), English journalist and broadcasting executive
- Lambert-Sigisbert Adam (1700–1759), French sculptor
- Louis Adam (1758–1848), French composer, music teacher, and piano virtuoso
- Luca Adam (born 2001), German-American Geographer
- Lucien Adam (1833–1918), French linguist
- Luke Adam (born 1990), Canadian ice hockey player
- Madge Adam (1912–2001), English astronomer
- Magda Ádám (1925–2017), Hungarian historian, Holocaust survivor
- Maisie Adam (born 1994), English comedian, writer and actress
- Melchior Adam (1575–1622), German historian
- Mihai Adam (1940–2015), Romanian footballer
- Mike Adam (born 1981), Canadian curler
- Nicolas-Sébastien Adam (1705–1778), also called "Adam the Younger", French sculptor
- Omer Adam (born 1993), Israeli singer
- Piers Adam (born 1964), British businessman, owner of London nightclubs
- Raif Adam (born 2005), German footballer
- Rebecca Adam (fl. 2010s), Australian lawyer and business executive
- Robert Adam (1728–1792), Scottish architect, creator of the Adam style
- Roger Adam, French aeronautical engineer
- Shiraz Adam (fl. 2010s), Canadian actor
- Sir Ronald Forbes Adam, 2nd Baronet (1885–1982), British Army General
- Ron Adam (1933–2014), Canadian football player
- Ronald Adam (actor) (1896–1979), British actor
- Shaiful Edham Adam (1976–1999), Singaporean convicted murderer
- Shea Adam (born 1990), American auto racing reporter
- Stéphane Adam (born 1969), French football player
- Theo Adam (1926–2019), German opera singer
- Udi Adam (born 1959), Israeli general
- Ulrich Adam (born 1950), German politician
- Vojtěch Adam (1950–2026), Czech politician
- Will Adam (born 1969), Church of England priest
- Wilhelm Adam (general) (1877–1949), German general
- Wilhelm Adam (1893–1978), German colonel
- William Adam (architect) (1689–1748), Scottish architect, mason, and entrepreneur
- William Adam (MP) (1751–1839), Scottish Member of Parliament (MP) and judge
- William Adam (artist) (1846–1931), English landscape artist who worked in California
- William Adam (malacologist) (1909–1988), Belgian malacologist
- William Adam (trumpeter) (1917–2013), American trumpeter, and academic
- Yekutiel Adam (1927–1982), Israeli general

== Scottish Adam family members ==
- William Adam (1689–1748), Scottish architect and builder, born near Kirkcaldy, Fife
  - John Adam (1721–1792), born near Kirkcaldy, eldest son of William, architect and builder
    - William Adam (1751–1839), only son of John Adam, Member of Parliament and judge
      - Charles Adam (1780–1853), second son of William Adam (1751–1839), British naval officer
        - William Patrick Adam (1823–1881), son of Charles Adam, British Liberal politician, Governor of Madras 1880–1881
      - Frederick Adam (1784–1853), fourth son of William Adam (1751–1839), General in the British Army, Governor of Madras 1832–1837
  - Robert Adam (1728–1792), born near Kirkcaldy, second son of William. Architect, interior designer and furniture designer, originator of the "Adam style"
  - James Adam (1732–1794), born in Edinburgh, third son of William. Architect and furniture designer, business partner of Robert

== See also ==
- Adam (given name)
- Adamyan, an Armenian surname derived from Adam
