= Julius Adam =

German painter (1852–1913)

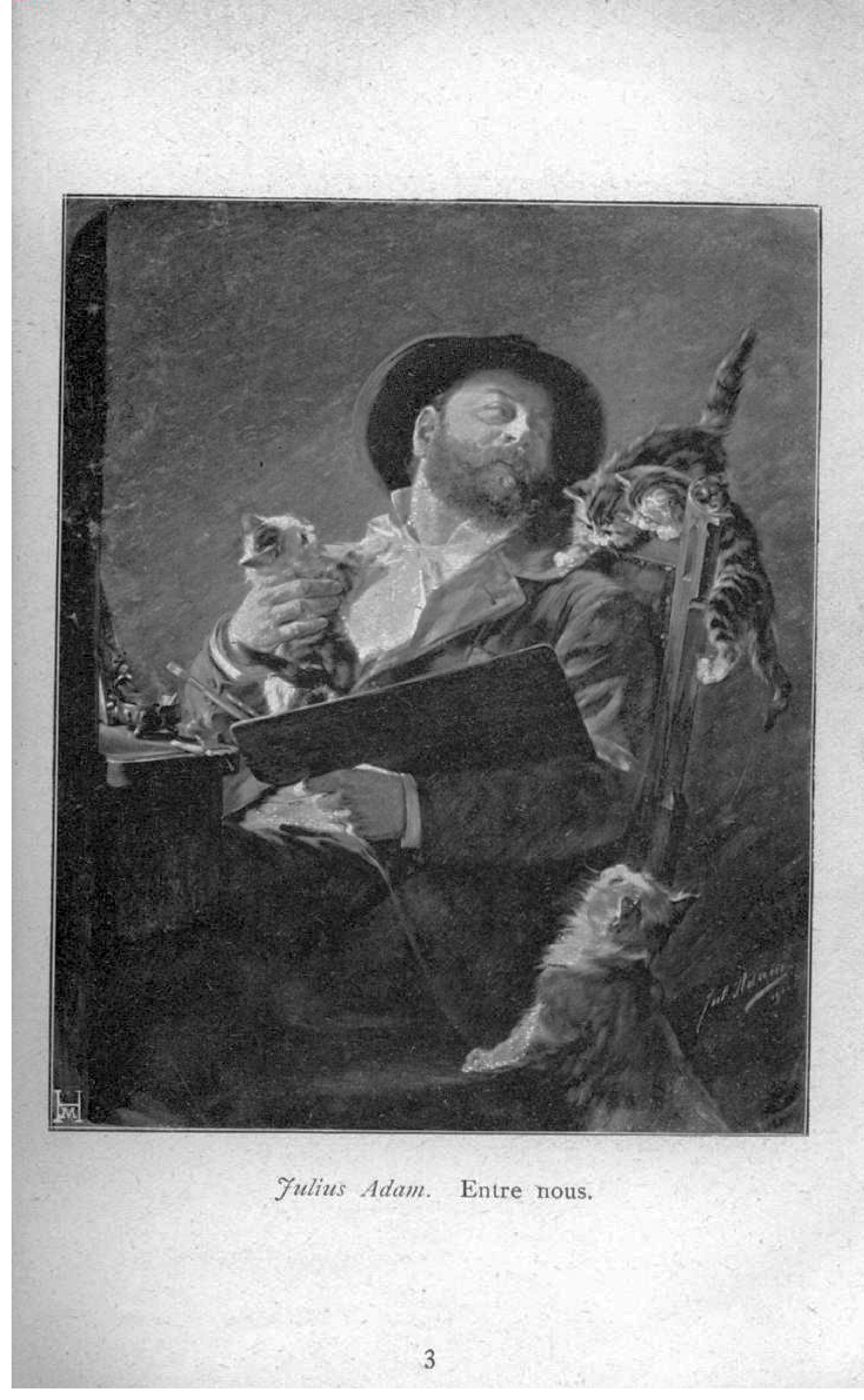
"Entre Nous" (self-portrait with kittens) by Julius Adam (lithograph of 1911 oil on canvas)

Julius Anton Adam, known as "Cats Adam", (German: Katzen-Adam; 18 May 1852 – 23 February 1913) was a German genre painter and animalier specialising in pictures of cats.

== Life ==
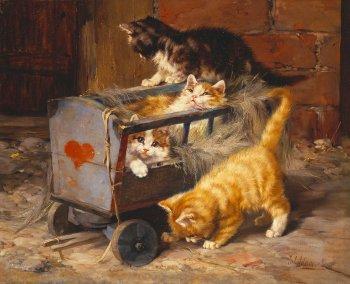
Die Einquartierung ("Occupying New Quarters") (c. 1890)

Julius Adam was a member of the important Adam family of Munich artists. His grandfather was Albrecht Adam, his uncles were Benno, Franz and Eugen Adam, and his cousin Emil Adam, all painters. His father, also called Julius Adam (1821–1874), was primarily a lithographer and photographer. At first Adam (the son) was occupied with landscape photography and worked for his father's business in Rio de Janeiro but later returned to Munich and settled down as a genre painter.

Initially Adam was a pupil of Prof. Michael Echter (1812–1879), later of Wilhelm von Diez (1839–1907) at the Akademie der Bildenden Künste in Munich. He began producing his successful cat pictures in 1882, the international popularity of which caused the high quality of his other work to be somewhat overlooked.

He married his first cousin Amalie, daughter of his uncle Benno, but they had no children.

== Grave ==
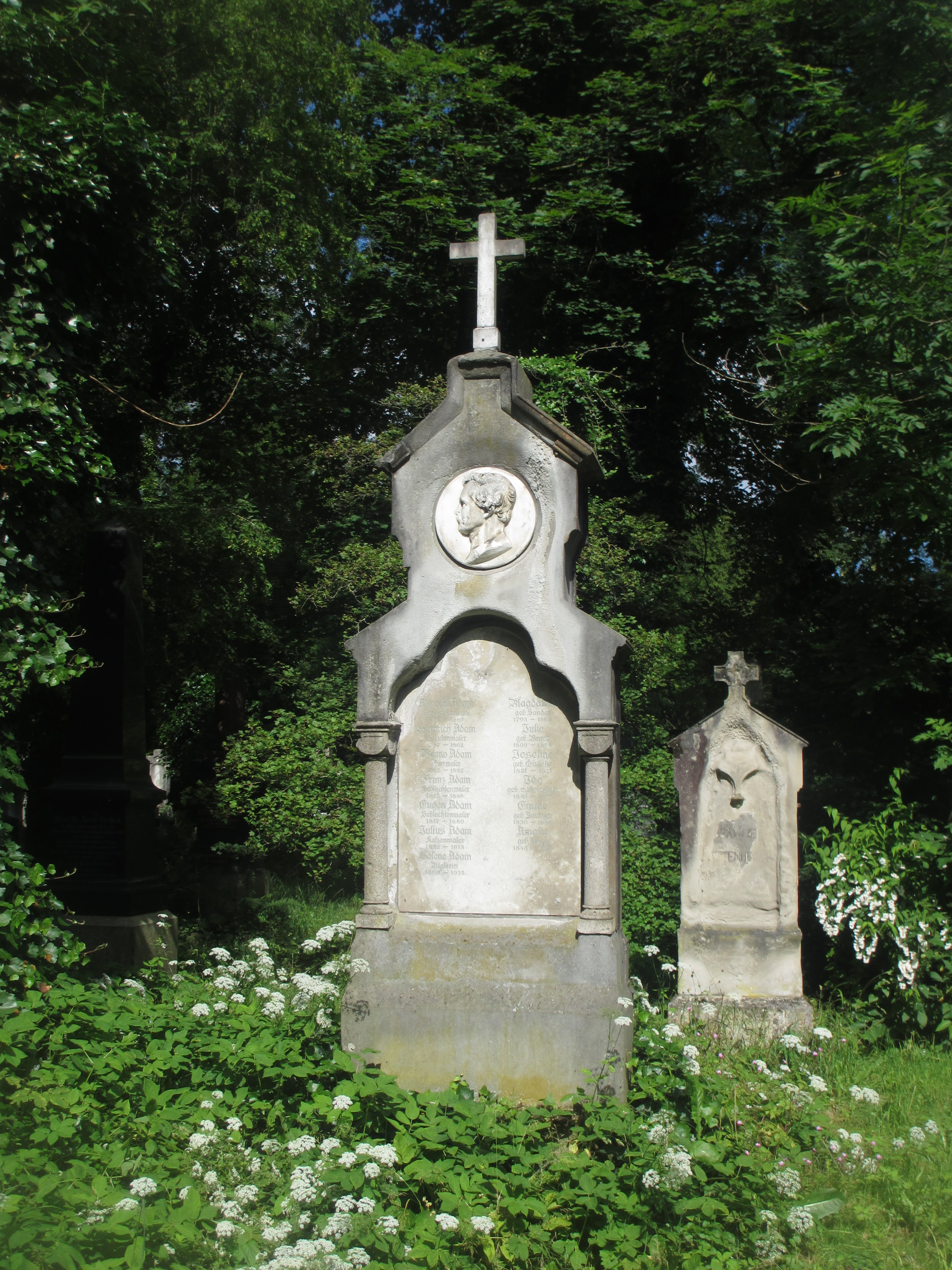
Grave of Albrecht Adam and his sons in the Alter Südfriedhof in Munich

According to the inscription on the monument of Julius Adam's grandfather, Albrecht Adam (1786 – 1862), in the Alter Südfriedhof in Munich (Gräberfeld 27 - Reihe 1 - Platz 25/26), Julius's grave is next to it, but the cemetery registers have no record of the burial.

== Sources ==
- Eberhard Hanfstaengl (1953). "Adam, Julius Anton". Neue Deutsche Biographie (in German). Vol. 1. Berlin: Duncker & Humblot. p. 52. (full text online).
