= Ronald Adams =

Ronald Adams may refer to:

- Ron Adams (born 1947), American basketball coach
- Ronald E. Adams (born 1943), lieutenant general of the United States Army
- Ron Adams (American football) (born 1966), American football quarterback
- Ronnie Adams (1916–2004), British rally driver

== See also ==
- Ronald Adam (disambiguation)
