= Adamyan =

Adamyan or Adamian (Armenian: Ադամյան, Russian: Адамян) is an Armenian patronymic surname derived from the given name Adam. The Western Armenian equivalent is Atamian (Ադամեան). Notable people with the surname include:

== Adamyan ==
- Andranik Adamyan (born 1952), Armenian football manager
- Armen Adamyan (born 1967), Armenian footballer and manager
- Artashes Adamyan (born 1970), Armenian football manager
- Ashot Adamyan (born 1953), Armenian actor
- Avetik Adamyan (born 1970), Armenian singer-songwriter
- Avo Adamyan (born 1981), Armenian singer, actor and showman
- Diana Adamyan (born 2000), Armenian violinist
- Karlen G. Adamyan (1937–2026), Armenian cardiologist
- Leyla Adamyan (born 1949), Soviet and Russian gynecologist
- Petros Adamian (1849–1891), Armenian actor
- Samvel Adamyan (born 1954), Armenian football manager
- Sargis Adamyan (born 1993), Armenian-German footballer
- Sirarpi Adamyan (born 1979), Armenian television presenter
- Vadym Adamyan (born 1938), Ukrainian mathematician and theoretical physicist

== Adamian ==
- Arman Adamian (born 1997), Russian judoka
- Arshak Adamian (1884–1956), Armenian conductor, composer and pedagogue
- Gregory H. Adamian (1926–2015), president emeritus and chancellor of Bentley College
- Hovannes Adamian (1879–1932), Armenian inventor
- Nora Adamian (1910–1991), Soviet Armenian writer
- Petros Adamian (1849–1891), Armenian actor

== Atamian ==
- Charles Garabed Atamian (1872–1947), Ottoman-born French painter of Armenian descent
- Evangelia Atamian, better known as Marika Ninou (1918–1957), Armenian-Greek rebetiko singer
- John Atamian (1942–2024), Canadian football player

== See also ==
- Adamians, early Christian sect
