= Ronald Adam =

Ronald Adam may refer to:

- Ronald Adam (British Army officer)
- Ronald Adam (actor), actor, theatre director and RAF officer
- Ron Adam, Canadian football quarterback
