= Heinrich Adam =

German painter

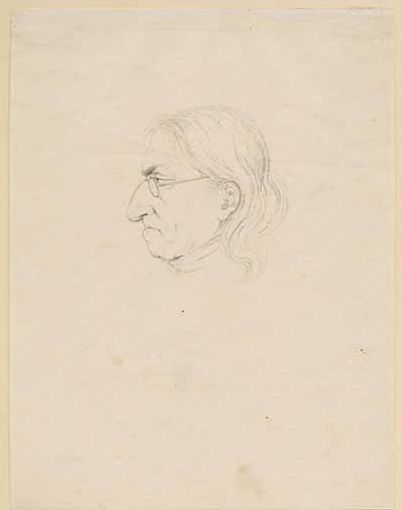
Portrait of Adam by Arthur von Ramberg, 1848

Heinrich Adam (1787 – 15 February 1862) was a German painter.

== Life ==
Heinrich Adam, a brother of Albrecht Adam, was born in Nördlingen in 1787. He studied painting in Augsburg and Munich, and distinguished himself as a painter of landscapes and as an engraver. In 1811 he stayed with Albrecht at Lake Como, and painted in watercolours. He also engraved six hunting-pieces, after his brother Albrecht, at Milan, in 1813.

Subsequently, he painted landscapes and views of towns, which are executed with great accuracy. His Das neue München mit den Bauten König Ludwigs I. (1839), a view in oils of the Max-Josephs-Platz, surrounded by 14 smaller pictures of new buildings in Munich, mounted together in one frame, is in the collection of the Munich Stadtmuseum. A set of watercolours in a similar format is in the Metropolitan Museum in New York.

He died in Munich in 1862.

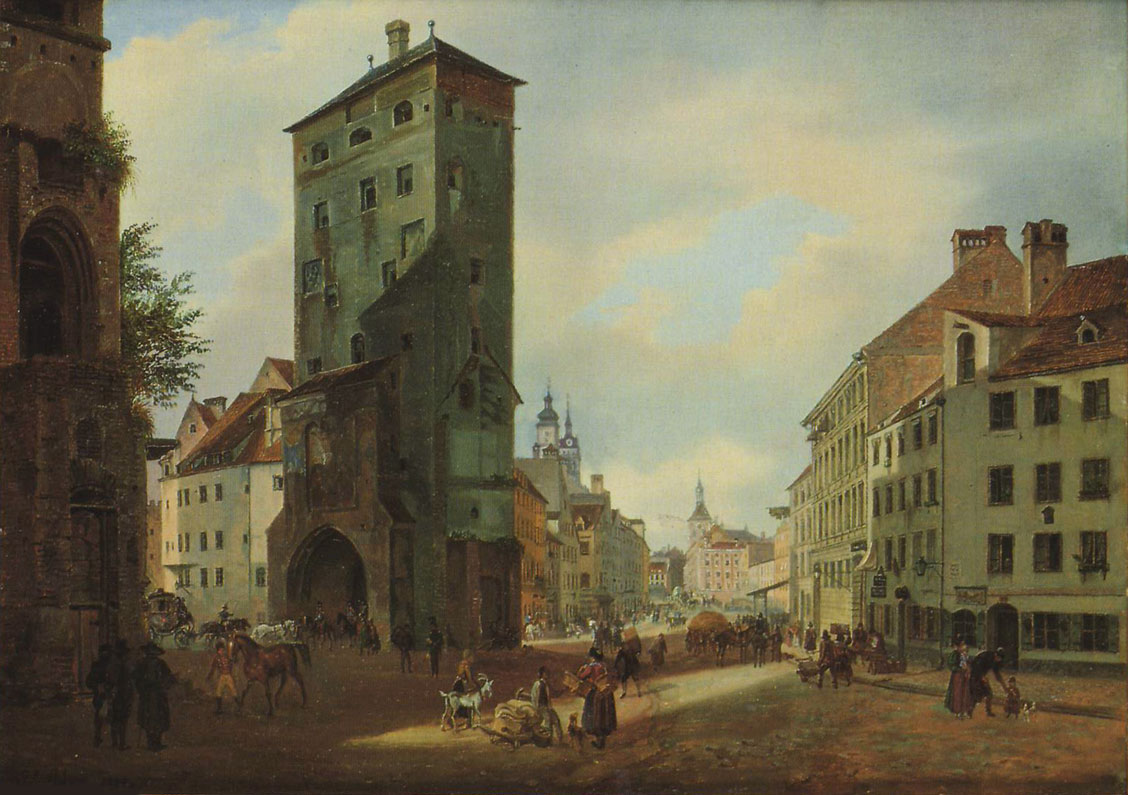
The Isar tower, 1834

== See also ==
- List of German painters
