= Nora Adamian =

Soviet-Armenian writer (1910–1991)

Nora Adamian (born Eleonora Georgievna Adamova; 1910–1991) was a Soviet Armenian writer. She was born in Baku in 1910 and studied at Baku State University between 1927 and 1930. She worked for the newspaper Kommunist in Yerevan from 1938 to 1945. Her literary endeavors commenced in the 1930s, although she was not published until the 1950s. Growing up and living in the Transcaucasia region, her work reflects the multiethnic, multicultural nature of the region. She published a series of short story collections; her stories have been translated into English, Spanish, Polish, Bengali, and other languages. She also wrote novels such as The Second Wife (1966).

She was married to the writer Yakov Volchek. Together they wrote the script for the film Zero Three which was shot at the Tallinnfilm studio in 1965. The film (as well as a radio play) was based on a 1961 story by Adamian.

She died in 1991.
