= Benno Adam =

German painter (1812–1892)

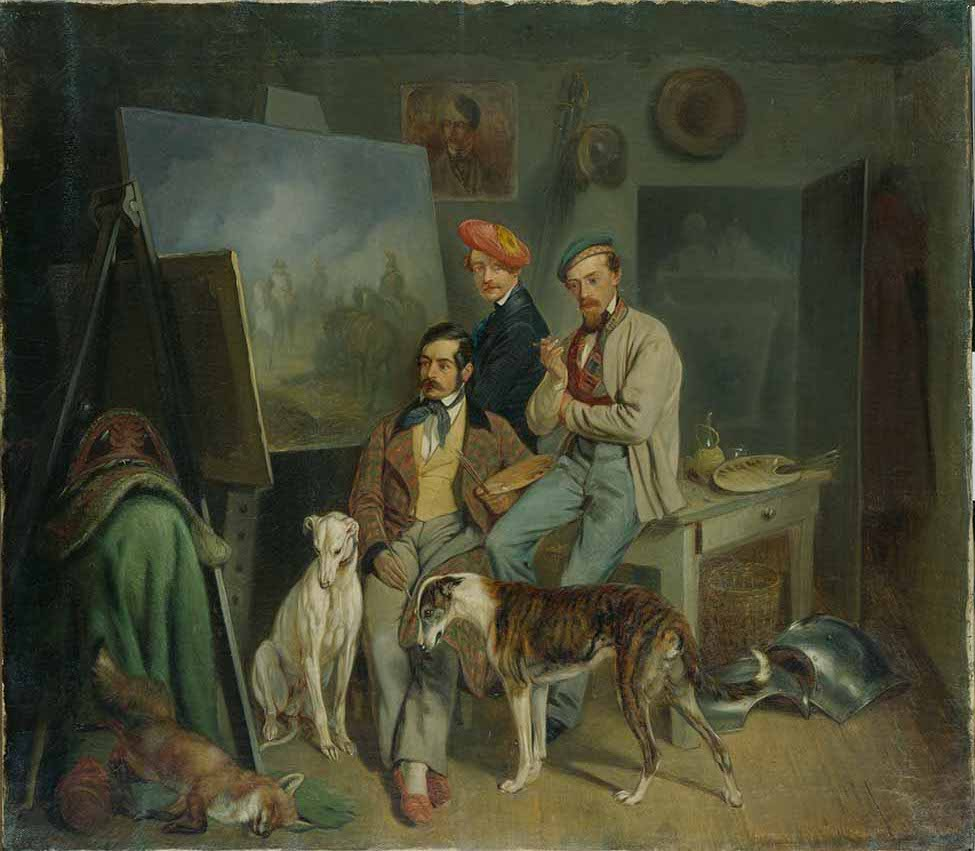
The Adam Brothers (1848), by Benno Adam, on the left

Benno Rafael Adam (15 July 1812 – 8 March 1892) was a German animal painter.

== Life ==
He was born in Munich. He was the eldest son of the painter Albrecht Adam, and distinguished himself especially by his depictions of game animals, hunting dogs and pets in larger compositions (deer and boar hunting, fox baiting, etc.) He was associated with the Chiemsee artists' colony.

In addition to his paintings, he illustrated several textbooks and manuals, including Anleitung zur Rindviehzucht und zur verschiedenartigen Benutzung des Hornviehs (Guide to Beef Cattle Breeding and the Diverse Use of Horned Cattle) by Heinrich Wilhelm von Pabst, J. G. Cotta, Stuttgart (1851).

In the summer of 1834, he married Josepha Quaglio, the eldest daughter of the painter and architect Domenico Quaglio. Their son Emil Adam also became a painter. Benno Adam's brothers were the painters Franz and Eugen Adam.

Adam died in 1882 in Kelheim.

== Selected paintings ==
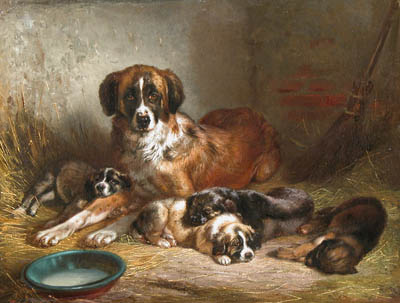
Bernese Mountain Dog and Her Pups (1862)

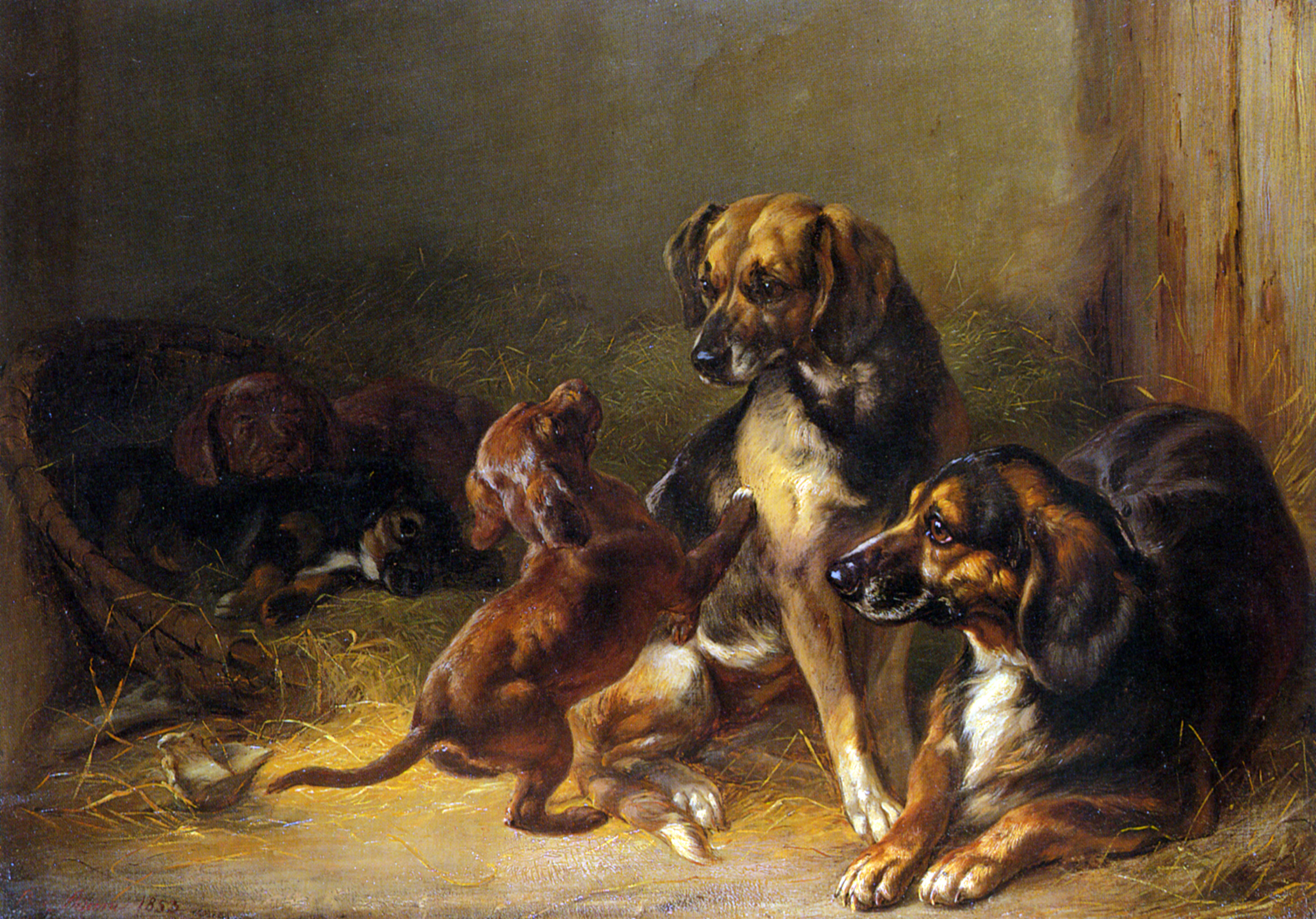
Dogs and Whelps (1853)

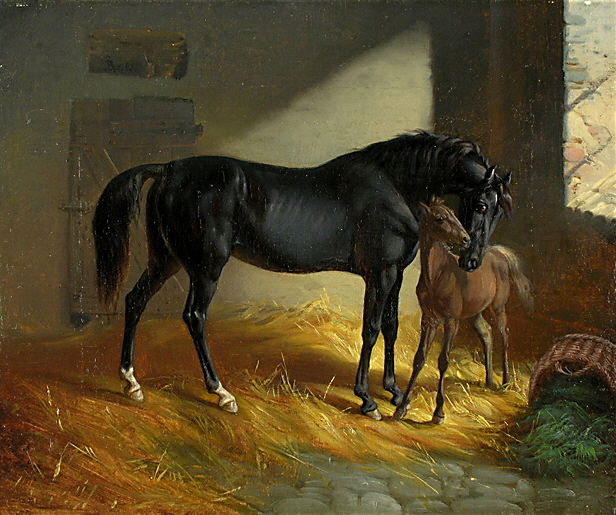
Mare and Her Foal
in the Barn

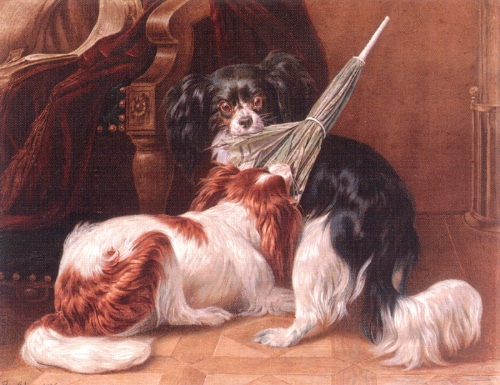
King Charles Spaniels

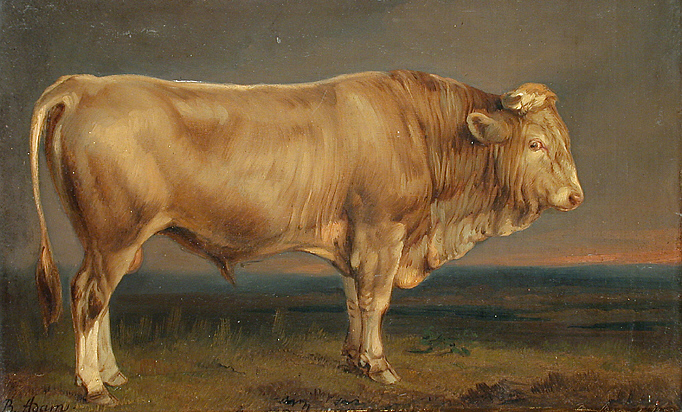
Bull

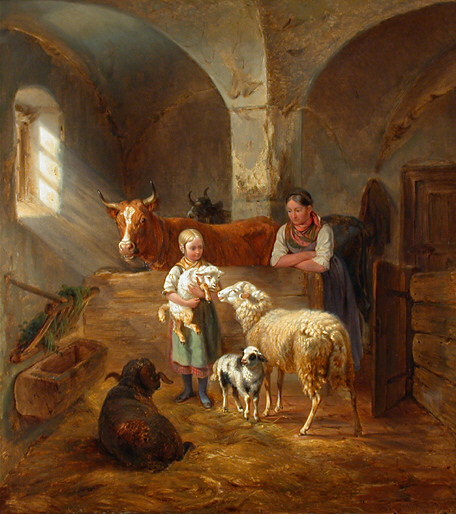
In the Stall

== Sources ==
- Hyacinth Holland (1900). "Adam, Benno" . Allgemeine Deutsche Biographie (in German). Vol. 45. Leipzig: Duncker & Humblot. pp. 688–689.
