= Charles Garabed Atamian =

French painter of Ottoman origin

Charles Garabed Atamian Շառլ Կարապետ Ադամեան
- Born: 18 September 1872; Istanbul, Ottoman Empire
- Died: 30 July 1947 (aged 74); Paris, France
- Occupation: Painter

Charles Garabed Atamian (September 18, 1872 – July 30, 1947) was an Ottoman-born French painter of Armenian ethnicity.

== Exhibitions ==
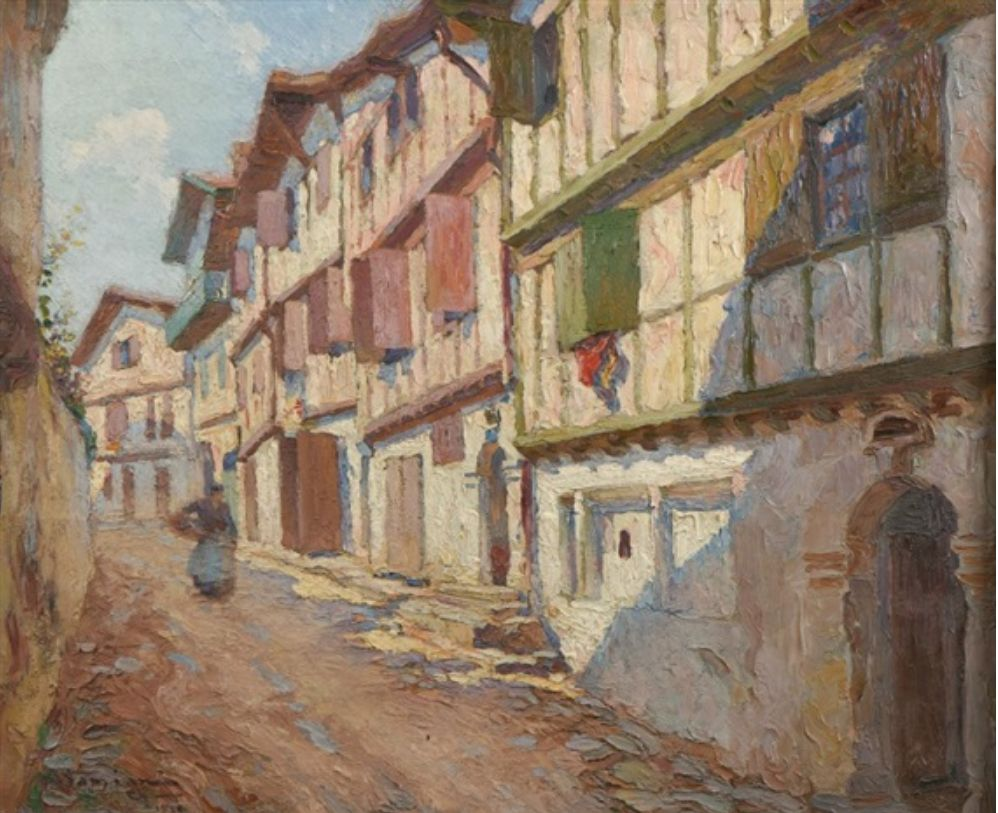
Alley in Saint-Jean-de-Luz

=== During his lifetime ===
Note that he exhibited regularly at the Salon of the Société Nationale des Beaux-Arts from 1913 to 1945 and at the Salon des Independants from 1938 to 1945.

- 1903 Salon d'Automne (Batz paintings), the Salon d'Automne was created and organized for the first time On October 31, 1903 at the Petit Palais
- 1918: Marseille, Mouillot Gallery (My mother)
- 1919: The National (paintings Agay)
- 1920: The National (Rhododendrons). There will exhibit until 1945
- March 1921: Allard Gallery (paintings of Saint-Jean-de-Luz, Villennes-sur-Seine)
- 1923: Galerie Georges Petit
- July 1923: Strasbourg
- 1924: Gallery Pouillé-Lepoutre, Lyon
- 1925: French Artists in Brussels (60 paintings)
- 1925: Devambez Gallery, Paris
- May 1927 and October 1927 Galerie Georges Petit
- August 1927: Beaux-Arts de Calais
- November 1928: Simonson Gallery, 19 rue Caumartin, Paris (paintings of Nice and Saint-Gilles)
- 1929: Exhibition of Contemporary French Art, Tokyo, Osaka continued in 1930

=== Posthumous ===
- July–August 2006: Saint-Hilaire-de-Monts, 24 works
- December 2007 - March 2007: Cagnes-sur-Mer, The Armenian painting in the nineteenth and twentieth century works on loan from the Musée d'Orsay
- February–June 2007: Paris, Musée National de la Marine Exhibition Aivazovsky
- September–October 2009: Saint-Gilles-Croix-de-Vie, Marcel Baudouin room
- June 2010:-Lucs-sur-Boulogne, Sénéchal Gallery
