= Heinrich Wilhelm von Pabst =

German agriculturalist (1798–1868)

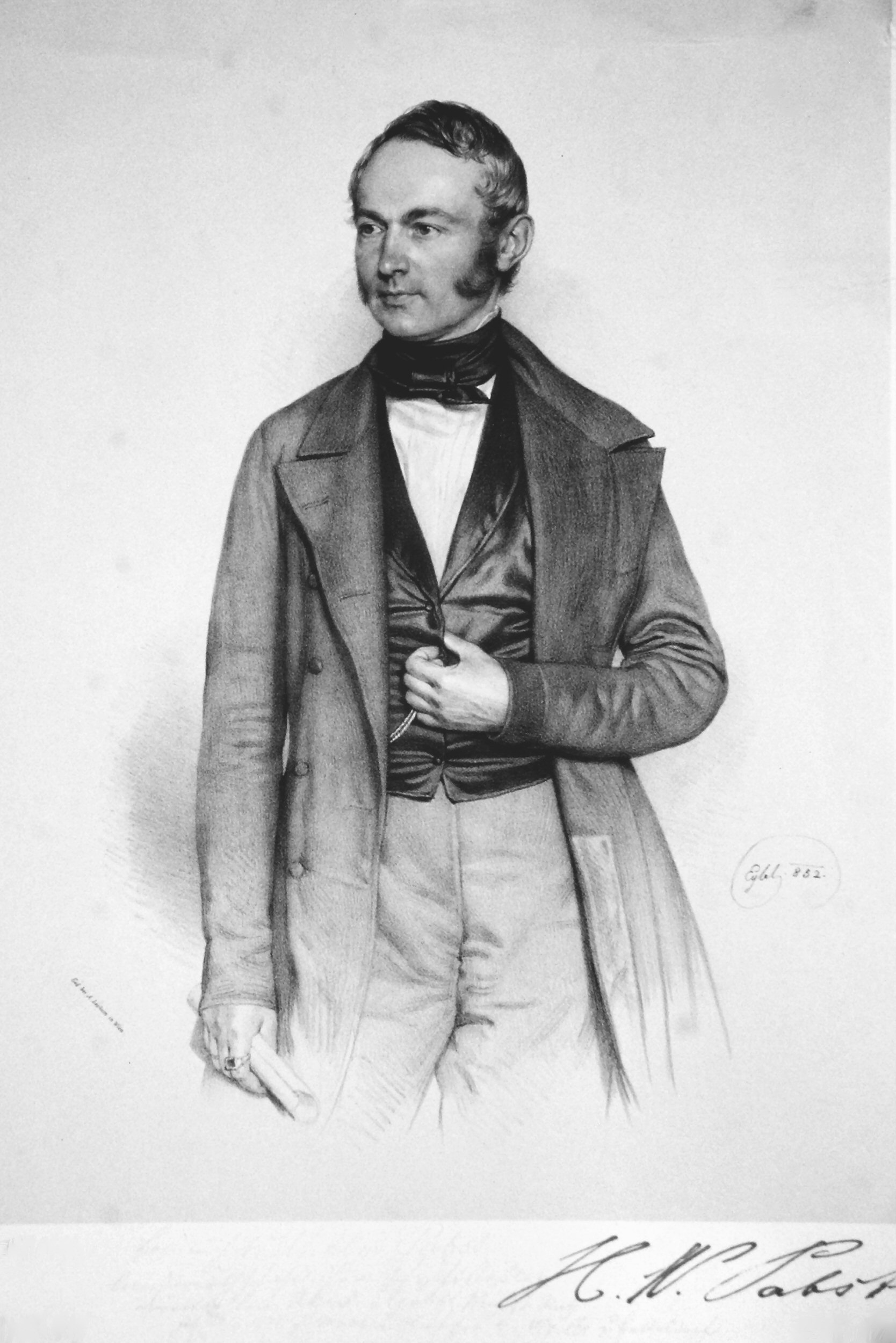
Heinrich Wilhelm von Pabst; 1852 lithograph by Franz Eybl.

Heinrich Wilhelm von Pabst (26 September 1798, in Maar, near Lauterbach – 10 July 1868, in Hütteldorf) was a German agriculturalist.

In his teens, he served as an agricultural apprentice on the estates of Freiherrn von Riedesel, and afterwards, spent a few years engaged in study trips throughout Germany. In 1823 he became a teacher and accountant at the agricultural academy of Hohenheim. In 1831 he received the title of Ökonomierat and was named perennial secretary of agricultural organizations in the Grand Duchy of Hesse. Subsequently, he opened an agricultural school in Kranichstein, near Darmstadt.

In 1839 he was named director of the agricultural school in Eldena, and in 1845 returned to the Hohenheim agricultural academy as manager. In 1856 he was appointed as Austrian Ministerialrat for land management as well as director of the learning establishment in Altenburg. In 1861 he became director of land management at the Ministry of Trade and Economics in Vienna.

== Selected works ==
- Anleitung zur Rindviehzucht und zur verschiedenartigen Benutzung des Hornviehes, 1829 – Instructions for cattle breeding and diverse uses of horned cattle.
- Allgemeine Grundsätze des Ackerbaues, 1841 – General principles of agriculture.
- Anleitung zur zweckmäßigen Kultur und Bereitung des Flachses, 1846 – Instructions on the effective cultivation and preparation of flax.
- Landwirthschaftliche Erfahrungen von Hohenheim, 1849 – Agricultural experiences at Hohenheim.
- Anleitung zur Rindviehzucht, 1851 – Instructions for cattle breeding.
- Die landwirthschaftliche Taxationslehre, 1851 – Agricultural taxation lessons.
- Lehrbuch der Landwirthschaft, 1861 – Textbook of agriculture.
