= Eugen Adam =

German painter (1817–1880)

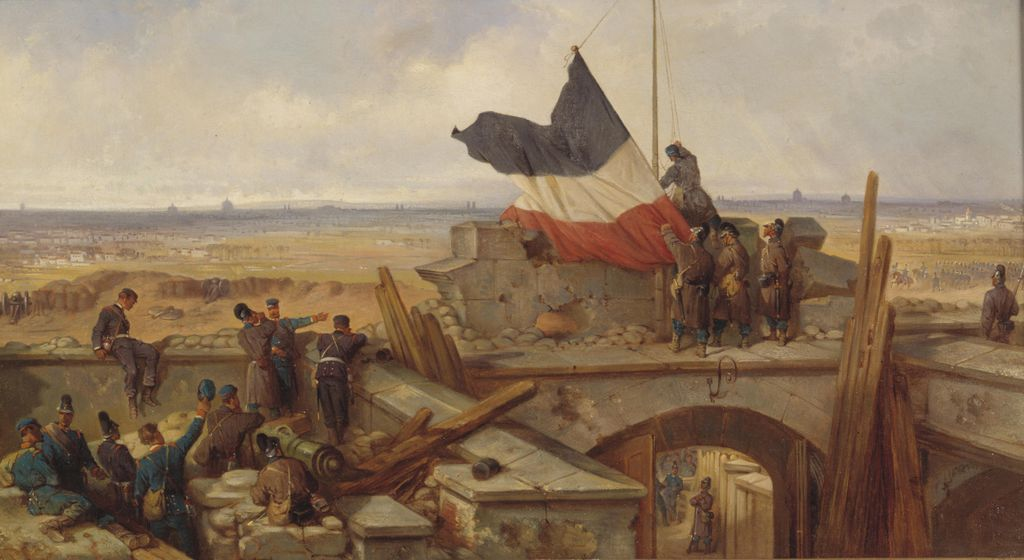
Eugen Adam's Fort Vanves

Eugen Adam (22 January 1817 – 6 June 1880) was a German painter.

He was born in Munich. He specialised on animal, genre, landscape and battle paintings. He had his atelier in Munich, and lived in Milan during the years 1849–1858. In 1859 he became war reporter for the journal Ueber Land und Meer. In 1861 he participated in Swiss campaigns, in 1870 and 1871 in the war between France and Germany.

His father Albrecht and brothers Julius, Franz and Benno were also painters.

== See also ==
- List of German painters

== Sources ==
- Allgemeine Deutsche Biographie - online version at Wikisource
