= Franz Adam =

German painter (1815–1886)

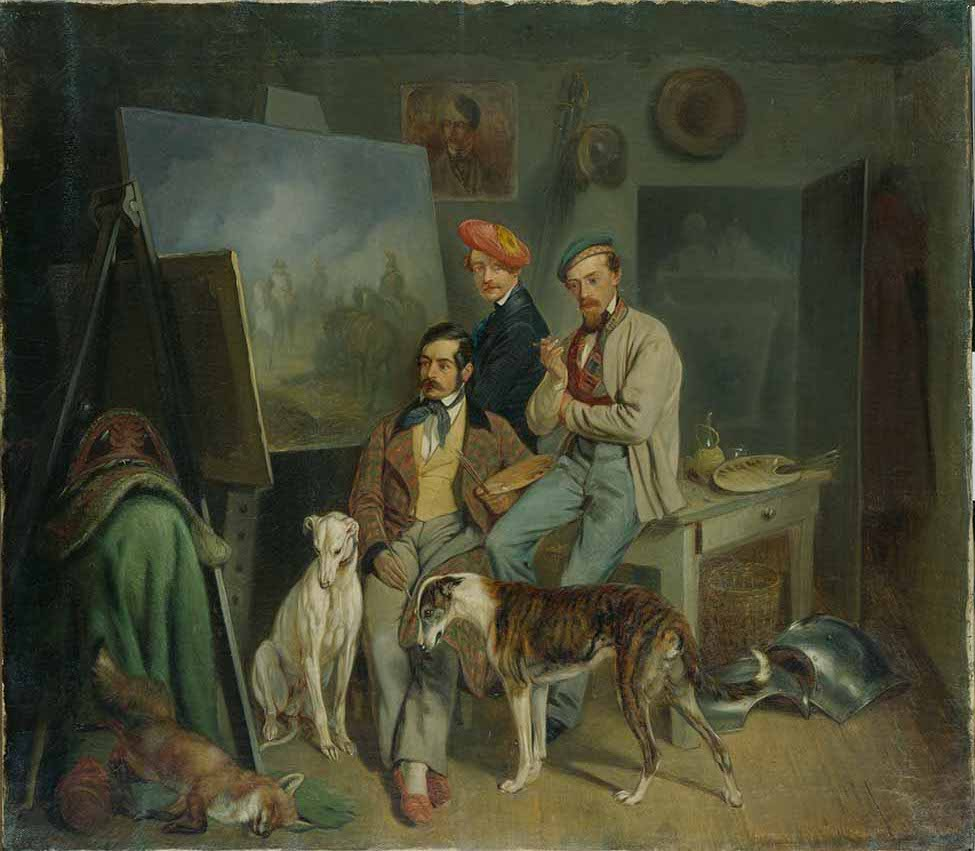
The Adam Brothers (1848), by Benno Adam. Franz is in the middle.

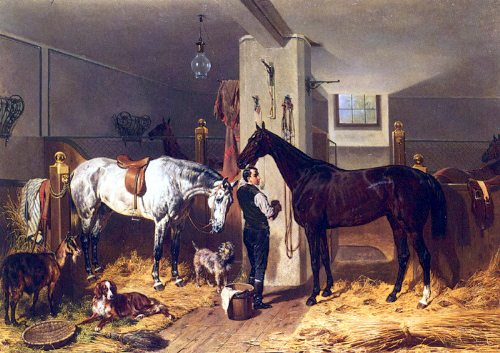
The Stable Lad (1860)

Franz Adam (May 4, 1815 – September 30, 1886) was a German painter, chiefly of military subjects, born and active for much of his life in Italy.

== Life ==
Adam was born in Milan, which about this time became part of the Austrian Empire, to painter Albrecht Adam, a German who had spent the prior several years in areas that would later become Italy. Franz Adam's first notable work was a collection of lithographs on the Revolutions of 1848 in the Italian states, done jointly with noted lithographer Denis Auguste Marie Raffet. He painted his first masterpiece during the Second Italian War of Independence of 1859, a scene from the Battle of Solferino. His best-known works, meanwhile, depict the Franco-Prussian War of 1870.

Of Adam's students, Josef Brandt was the most notable. Adam also taught painting to his nephew, Emil Adam. His brothers Benno and Eugen were also painters.

== See also ==
- List of German painters
