= Albrecht Adam =

German painter (1786–1862)

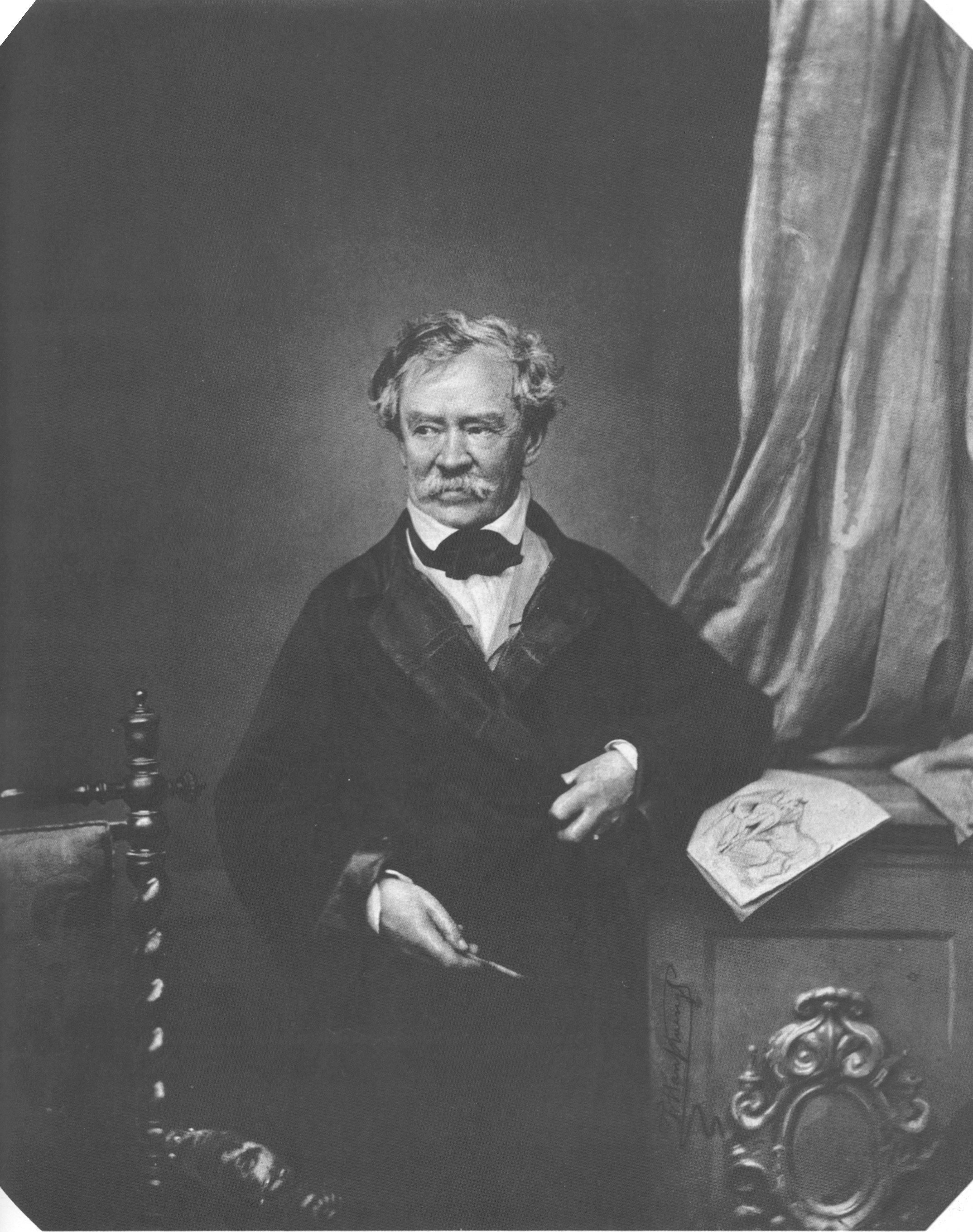
- Albrecht Adam photographed by Franz Hanfstaengl around 1850
- Born: 16 April 1786; Nördlingen, Bavaria, Germany
- Died: 28 August 1862 (aged 76); Munich, Bavaria, Germany
- Resting place: Alter Südfriedhof
- Known for: Painting

Albrecht Adam (16 April 1786 – 28 August 1862) was a Bavarian painter, who accompanied Napoleon Bonaparte during the 1812 Russian campaign. He was attached as an official artist to the Bavarian contingent in Bonaparte's Grande Armée. Throughout the campaign he sketched, painted and depicted an important record of the campaign to Moscow. In his memoirs he described the carnage of Borodino and late into his career he was still painting battle scenes from the Napoleonic period. He became a well-known equine artist, a legacy continued by his grandson, Emil Adam.

== Life and career ==
Albrecht Adam was born in Nördlingen, then a small free state in southern Germany, (Note: Nördlingen was absorbed into the Electorate of Bavaria in 1803 as a consequence of German mediatization. In September 1802 Bavaria occupied the city in anticipation of the decree.) to Jeremias Adam and Margaretha Thilo in 1786. His brother Heinrich Adam (1787–1862), also a painter was born the following year. Albrecht's talent for painting became apparent at an early age as by 1800 he was painting French troops as they marched through southern Germany. Initially apprenticed as a confectioner in Nuremberg, in 1803 he enrolled at the Academy of Fine Arts, Nuremberg where he was tutored in drawing by Christoph Zwinger (1764–1813). In July 1807 he moved to Munich where he learnt from the war and battle artist Johann Lorenz Rugendas II (1775–1826). and befriended fellow artists Margarethe Geiger and Sophie Reinhard, who later moved with him to Vienna. In 1809 Austria attacked Napoleon's ally Bavaria, an action that led to a short, unpleasant conflict that culminated in Austrian defeat by France and Bavaria at the Battle of Teugen-Hausen. Adam who accompanied the victorious army to Vienna produced a series of military impressions of the conflict, beginning a theme that would dominate his career. It was during his brief residency in Vienna, that he met Prince Eugene de Beauharnais, the Viceroy of Italy and Bonaparte's stepson and his wife Princess Augusta of Bavaria. The young artist was asked to join Prince Eugene's household in Milan as a Court painter. His duties included accompanying Eugene and his staff on military campaigns across Europe.

== Adam with the Grande Armée to Moscow ==
In 1812 Adam accompanied Prince Eugene as an artist on the expedition to Russia. He was given a military officer's rank and attached to Eugene's Topographical Bureau, a small unit of engineers, cartographers and draughtsmen which had been established in 1801. Adam travelled with IV Corps, composed mainly of Italian troops, on the long difficult journey to Moscow. As the Grande Armée progressed across Europe and into Russia Adam wrote, sketched and painted. He was present at all the major actions and witnessed the triumphant march into the smouldering ruins of Moscow. There seems little doubt that Adam was depressed, by what he had witnessed. After the key Battle of Borodino he described his feelings on visiting the battlefield.... The scene was one that filled me with horror. I felt paralysed and, only by calling to mind the countless other horrors I had been witness to in this frightful campaign, could I shake myself from my stupor .... He returned early from Moscow arriving in Munich in December 1812 thus missing the painful decimation of the Grande Armée as it retreated from Moscow. He remained on Prince Eugene's staff for a further three years during which time Adam produced seventy-seven colour plates depicting the aftermath of the conflict. They show devastated landscapes, battlefields strewn with corpses, bewildered civilians, battle weary soldiers and razed towns. The memoirs that accompany each plate provide a frank composition to the war that Adam witnessed.

== Post 1815 career ==
In 1815, with the Napoleonic wars drawing to a close, Adam relocated permanently to Munich, where he was court painter to Maximilian I Joseph of Bavaria, a position that allowed him to complete commissions for many prominent families in Bavaria and Austria. Albrecht Adam's studio became a centre for aspiring artists not least his three painter sons: Benno, Eugen and Franz. Theodor Horschelt, who later became known for his paintings of the Russian Caucasian War was a frequent visitor.

In 1824, his former employer Prince Eugene died and Adam began collating the images of the Russian Campaign gathering them together under the title Voyage pittoresque et militaire. The lithographs published in Munich between 1828 and 1833, were based on the sketches he had taken during the campaign and remain of considerable historical significance. They proved a considerable commercial success and the images have been used many times since the first edition. A number of original drawings and images in oil are held by the Hermitage Museum in Saint Petersburg.

Royal patronage continued under Ludwig I with commissions including a painting of the Battle of Borodino for the Royal Munich Residenz in 1838. Adam also painted, for Maximilian von Leuchtenberg, twelve battle scenes to hang in his palace in St Petersburg. On 18 March 1848, the Milanese rebelled against Austrian rule, during the so-called Five Days (Italian: Le Cinque Giornate). The Austrians were forced to withdraw from Milan whilst the insurgents sought military aid from the Kingdom of Sardinia. Austrians forces led by Field Marshall Joseph Radetzky regathered and defeated Sardinian forces at the first Battle of Custoza and again, at the Battle of Novara. Albrecht Adam painted a series of commissioned paintings that depicted the events including a rather flattering canvass showing Radetsky on a white horse (id est Napoleon) with his general staff before the fall of Milan.

In 1859 Adam followed the army of Napoleon III of France during the Italian campaign against Austria recording the action in a series of drawings and sketches. Returning to Munich he painted the Battle of Landshut 1809 (1859) and the Battle of Zorndorf 1758 (1860) for Maximilian II of Bavaria. He remained a significant military painter, often assisted by his sons, until his death in Munich on 16 August 1862. His brother Heinrich predeceased him by six months.

In around 1850 Adam is recorded as living at Sing Straße 13 in Munich.

== Illustrations of works ==
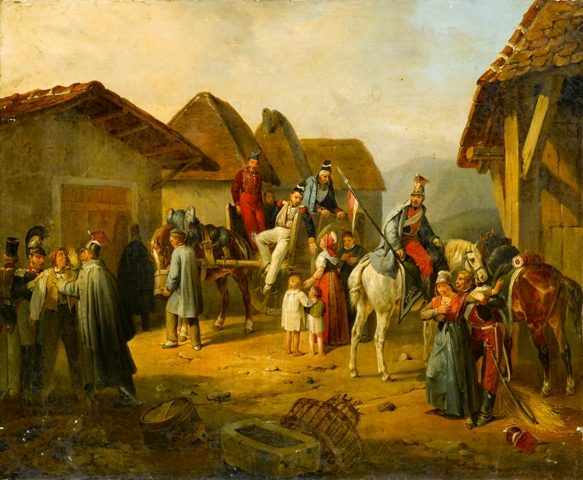
Soldiers Resting in a Village, A Cavalry Officer Holding an Austrian Banner, oil on canvas

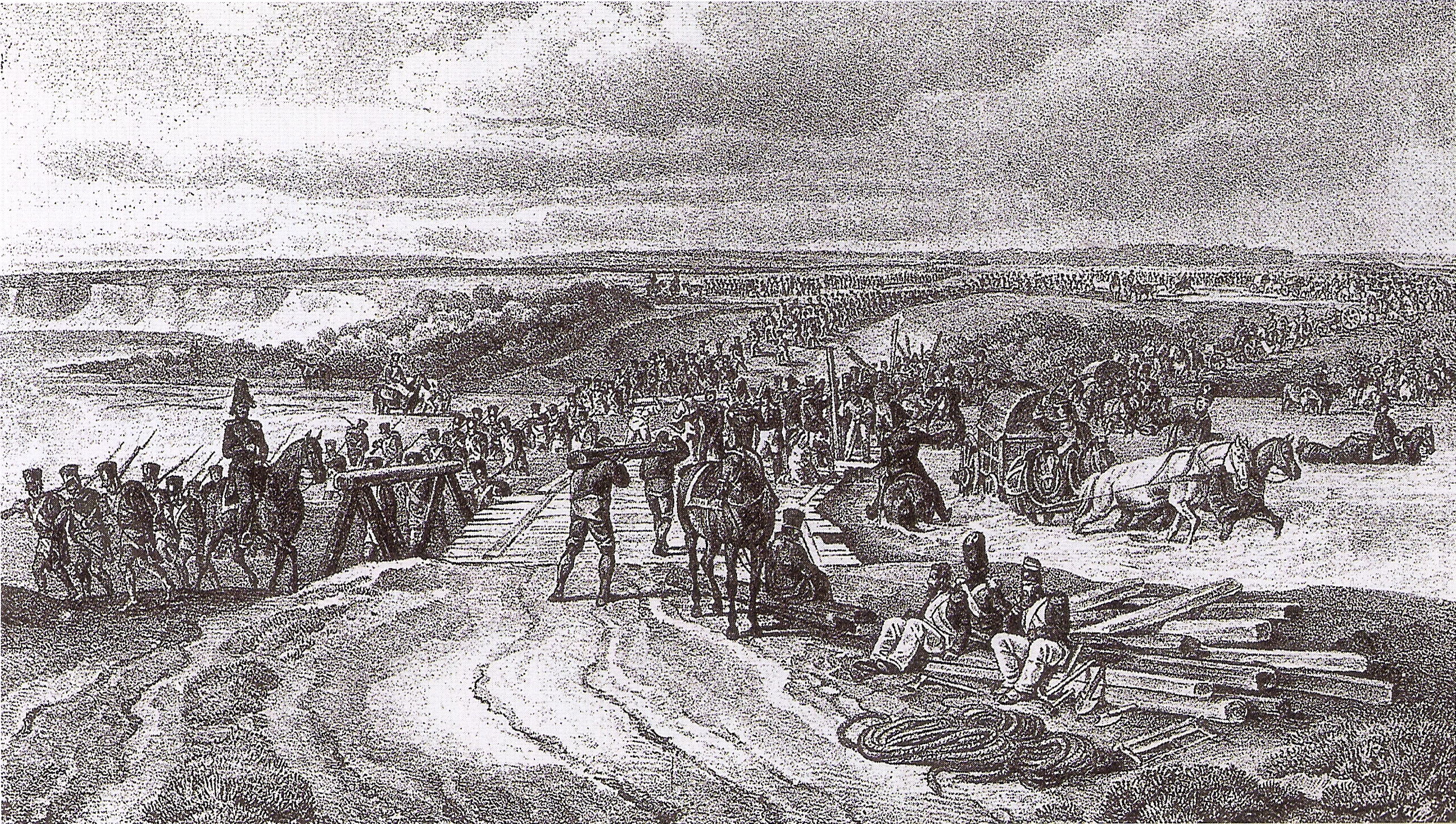
One of Adam's depictions of the French invasion of Russia, showing the crossing of the Dnieper in September 1812

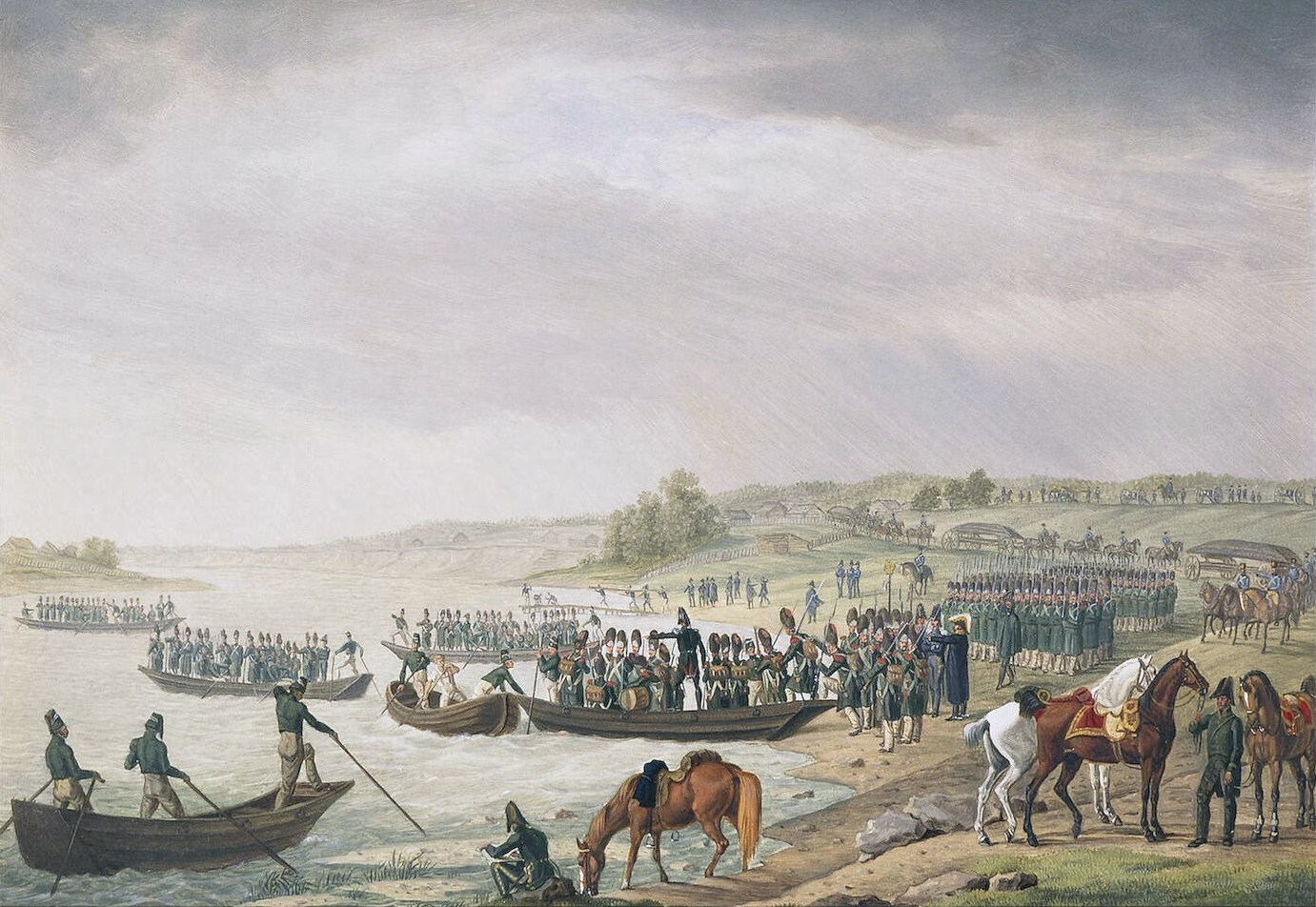
Lithograph depicting Prince Eugene of Beauharnis crossing the river Neman 1812

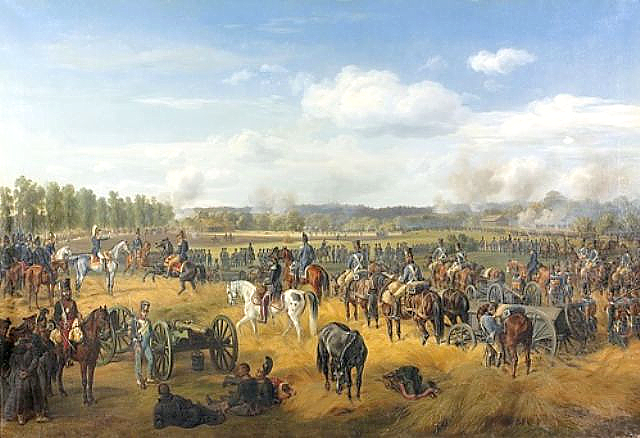
Battle of Ostrovno fought during the Russian Campaign 1812.

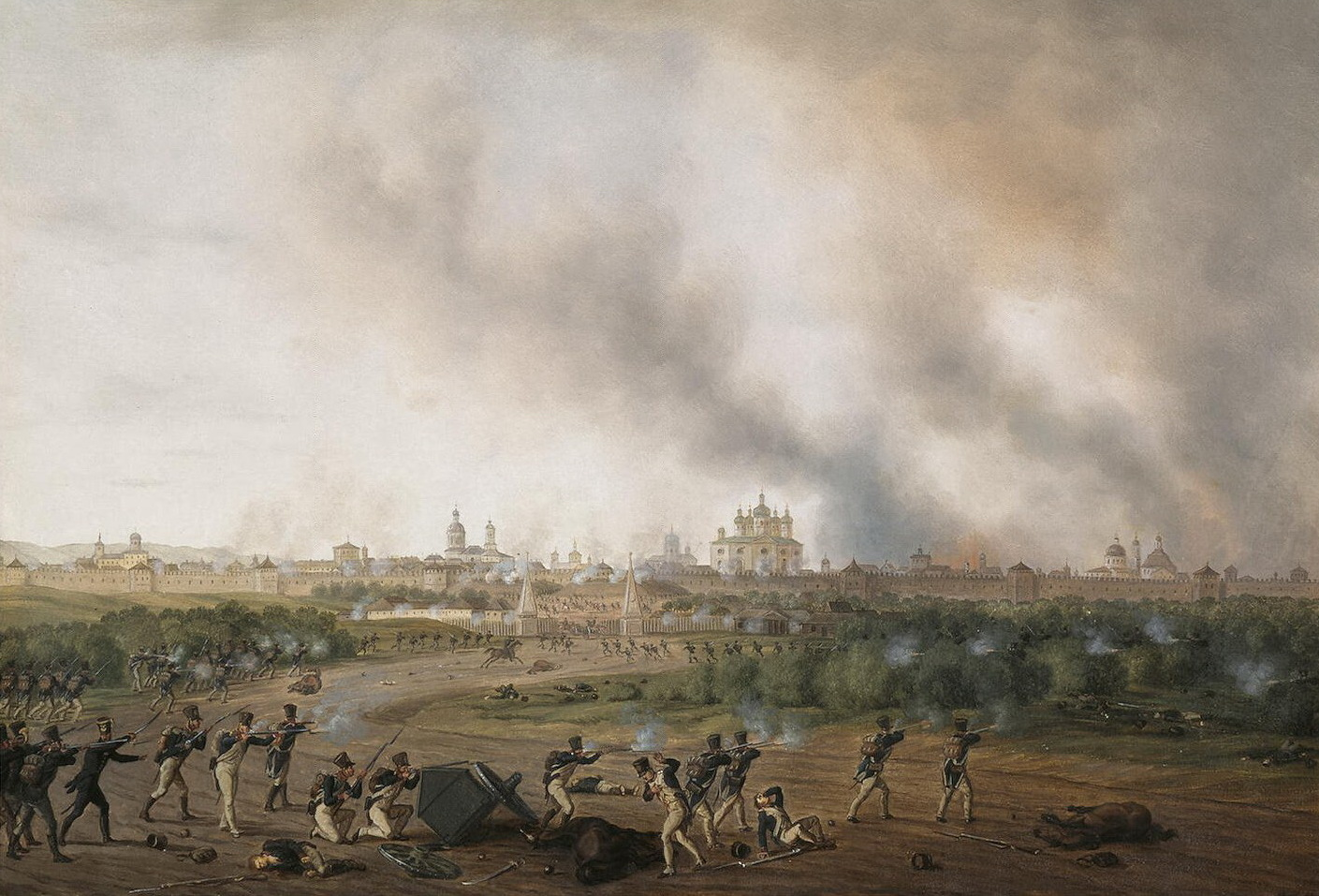
Battle of Smolensk on 18 August 1812

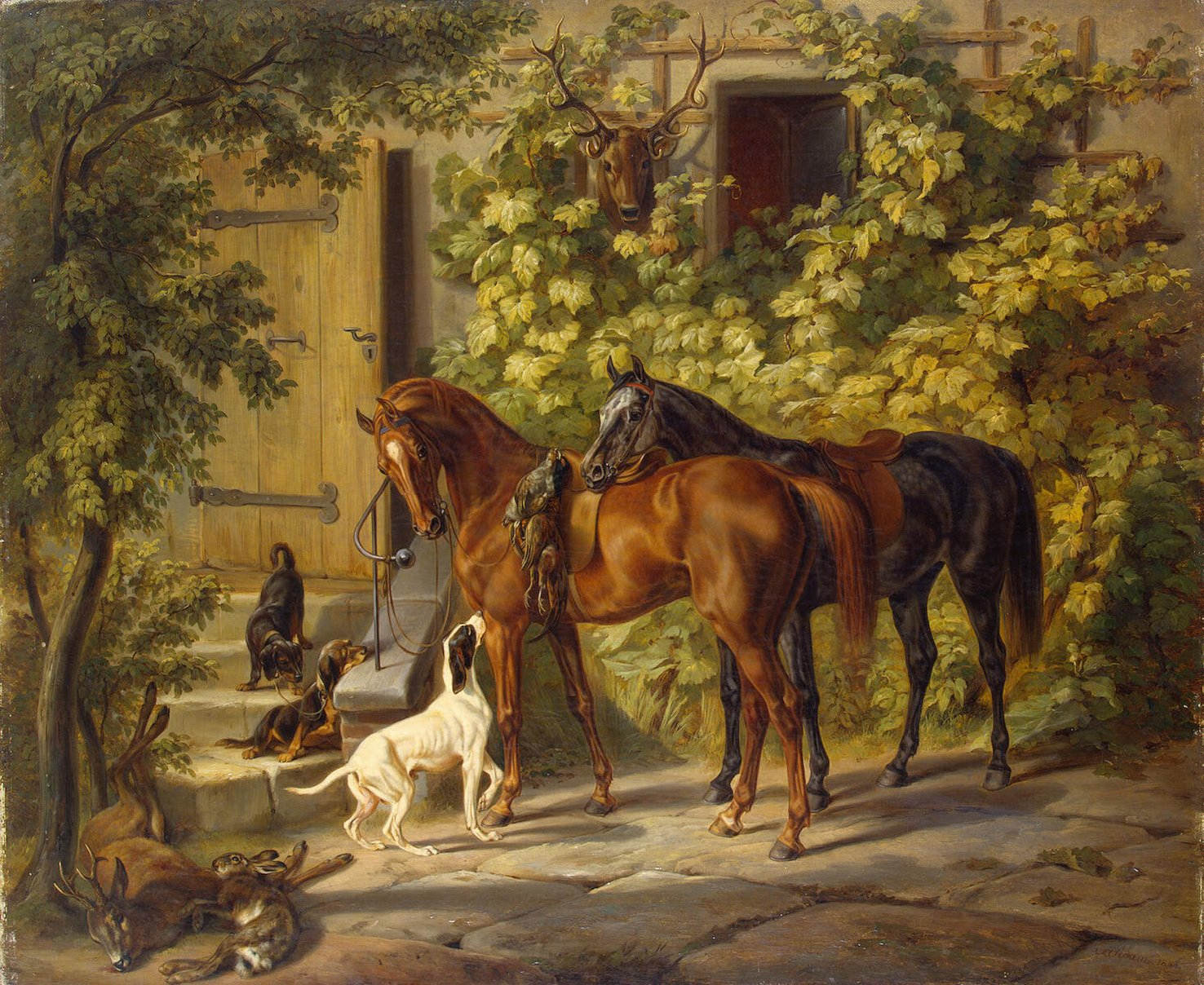
Horses at the Porch 1843

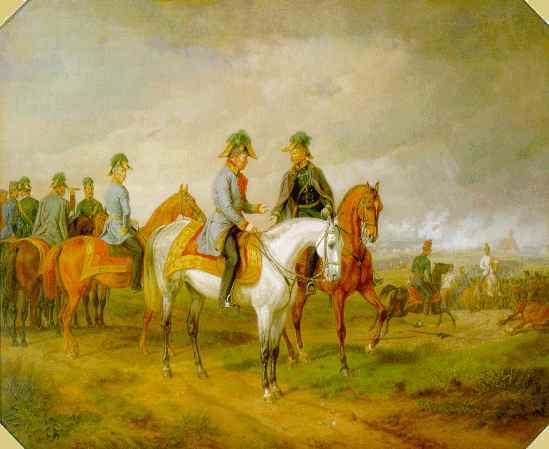
Die Schlacht bei Novarra (The Battle of Novarra), 1858, by Albrecht Adam.

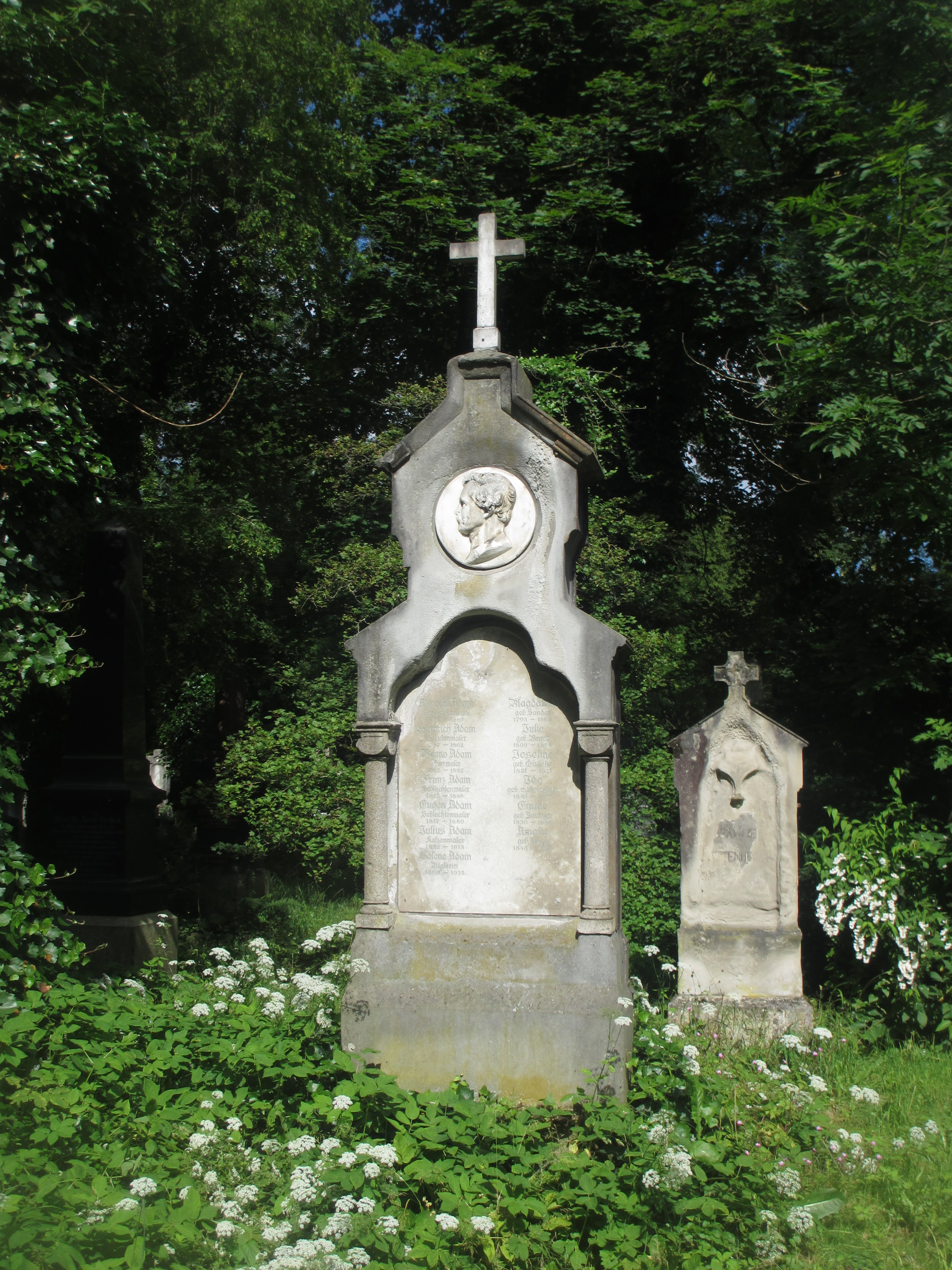
Tomb of Albrecht Adam at the Old Southern Cemetery in Munich

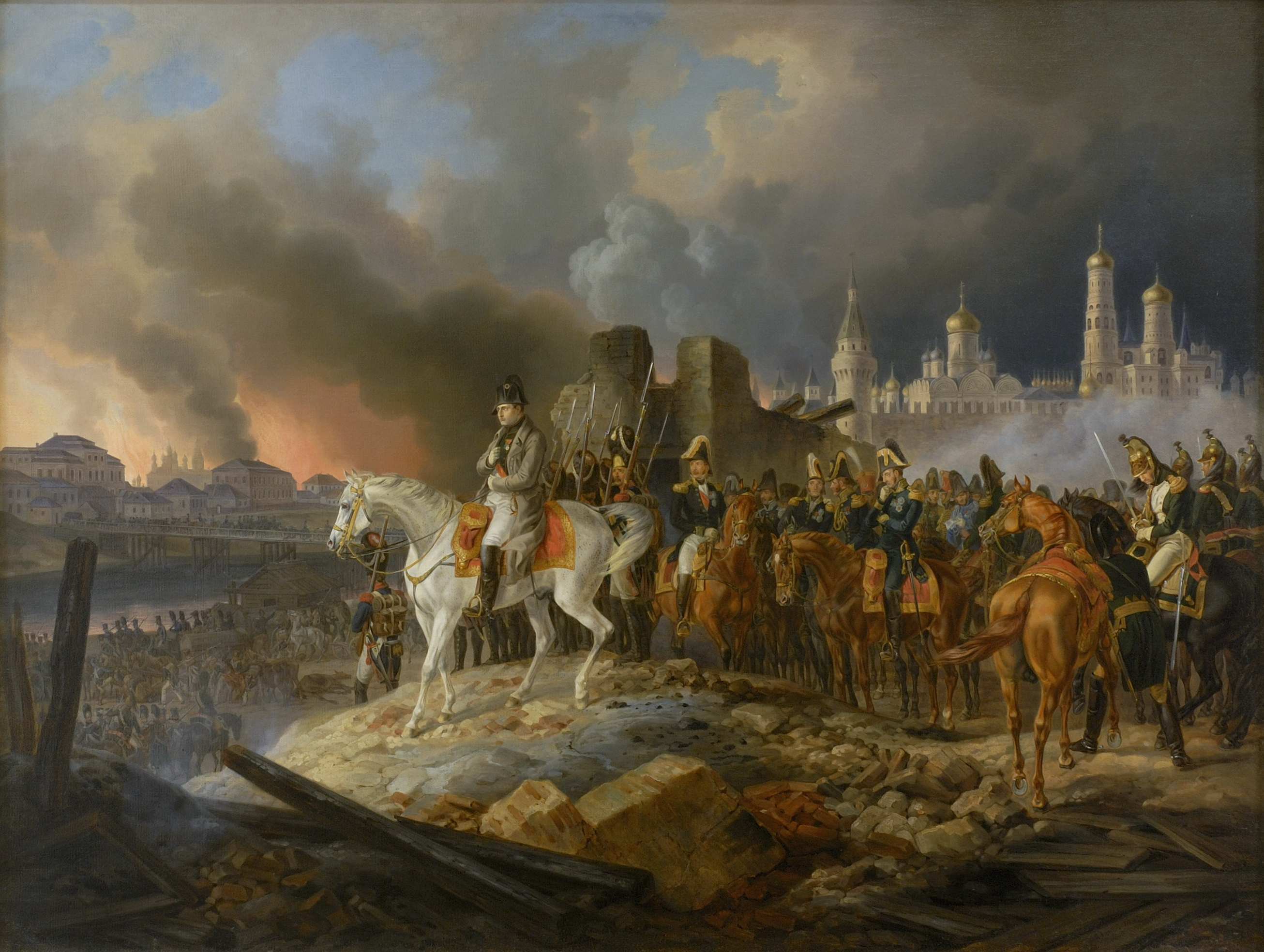
Napoleon in Burning Moscow, depicting Napoleon observing the Fire of Moscow, painted in 1841

fils de l'empereur napoléon 4

== See also ==
- List of German painters
