= Ron Adam =

Canadian football player

No. 80, 10
- Positions: Quarterback, Defensive back

Personal information
- Born: December 16, 1933; Lloydminster, Saskatchewan, Canada
- Died: October 27, 2014 (aged 80); Regina, Saskatchewan, Canada
- Listed height: 6 ft 1 in (1.85 m)
- Listed weight: 195 lb (88 kg)

Career history
- 1954–1960: Saskatchewan Roughriders

Ronald David Adam (December 16, 1933 – October 27, 2014) was a Canadian professional football player who played seven seasons with the Saskatchewan Roughriders of the Canadian Football League (CFL).

== Early life ==
Ronald David Adam was born on December 16, 1933, in Lloydminster, Saskatchewan. He grew up in Yorkton and Saskatoon. For high school, he attended City Park Collegiate in City Park, Saskatoon.

Adam played junior football for the Saskatoon Hilltops from 1951 to 1953 as a quarterback, winning a national title with the team in 1953. The Hilltops defeated the Windsor AKO Fratmen 34–6 to win the 1953 junior football national title.

== Professional career ==
Adam dressed in 98 games for the Saskatchewan Roughriders from 1954 to 1960 as a quarterback and defensive back, recording career totals of 50 completions on 139 passing attempts (36.0%) for 1,065 yards, six touchdowns, and 16 interceptions, 52 rushes for 112 yards, three receptions for 68 yards and one touchdown, ten defensive interceptions for 120 yards, 31 kickoff returns for 585 yards, and 79 punt returns for 410 yards.

Adam was released by the Roughriders in August 1961 before the start of the regular season.

== Personal life ==
Adam owned a gas station. He later retired as a manager with Sears. He died on October 27, 2014, in Regina, Saskatchewan.
