= Emil Adam =

German painter (1843–1924)

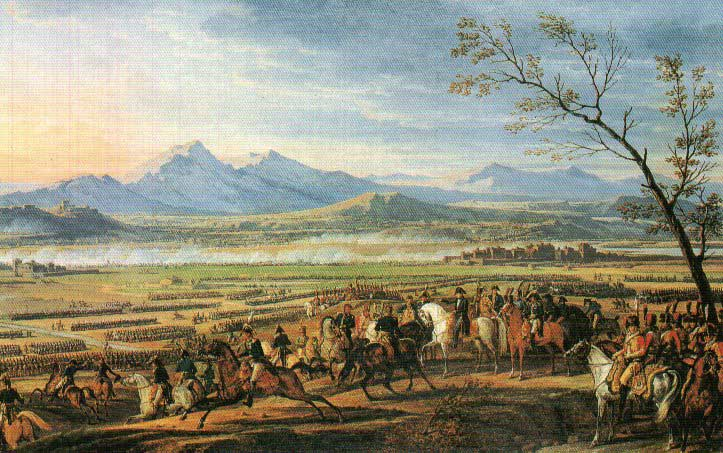
The Battle of Wagram

Emil Franz Adam (20 May 1843 – 19 January 1924) was a German equestrian painter.

== Life ==
Adam was born in Munich. He was the son of animal painter Benno Adam. He initially intended to devote himself to science, but, carried away by the example of his grandfather, the equestrian painter Albrecht Adam, he decided to be a painter. He studied painting under the guidance of his uncle, the painter Franz Adam, and later under Jean-François Portaels in Brussels. He became one of the last great masters in depicting horses, horse portraits and hunting scenes.

Adam married Josephine Marie, née Wurmb. They had two sons, the painter Richard Benno Adam (1873–1937) and the priest Ernst Adam (1884–1955).

Adam's work consisted primarily of horse paintings, equestrian portraits, and hunting scenes. He was invited, along with his father to Pardubice, Bohemia, in 1867, to paint the hunting club members portrait, a group of 60 people.

Adam died in Munich in 1924.

== Gallery ==
Emil Adam's paintings

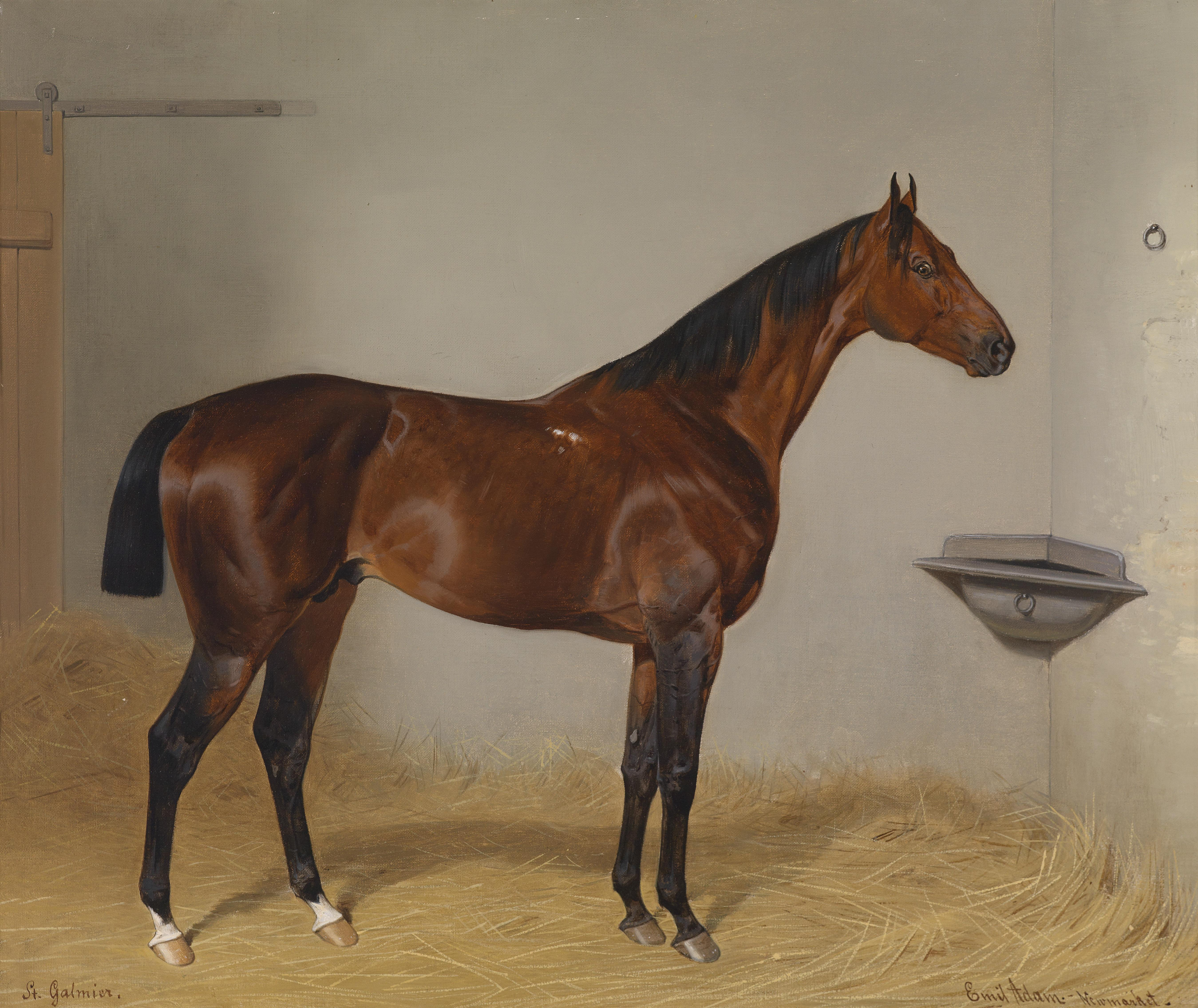
St Galmier

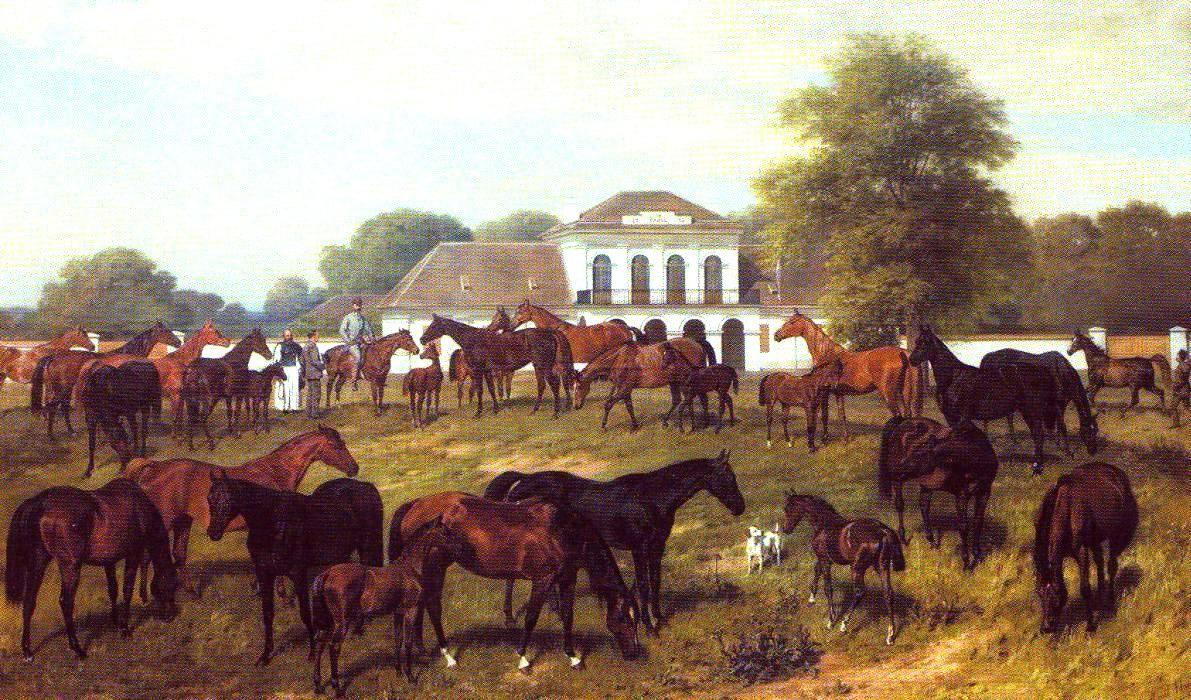
The herd of Fenékpuszta

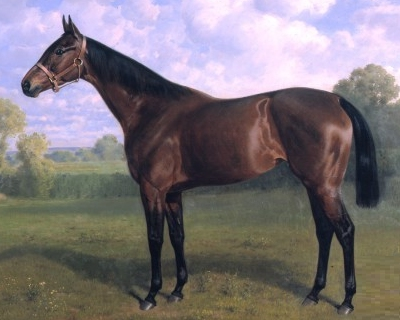
Sceptre

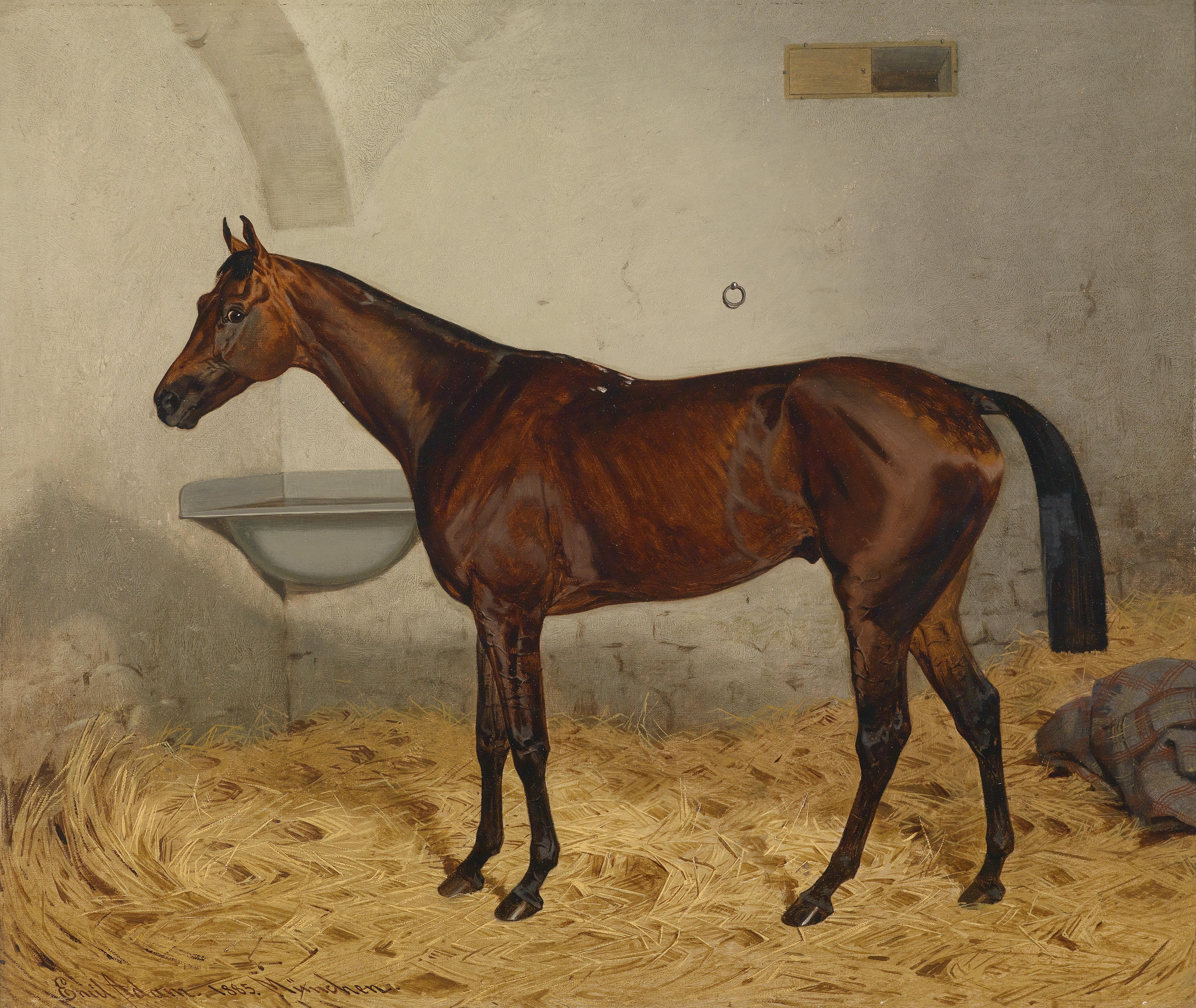
Mettalist, 1885

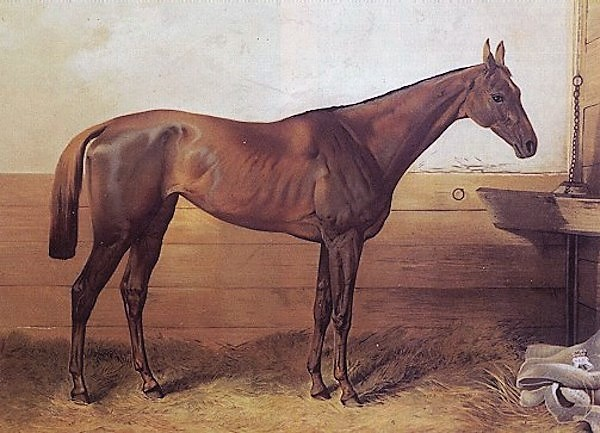
Kincsem, 1887

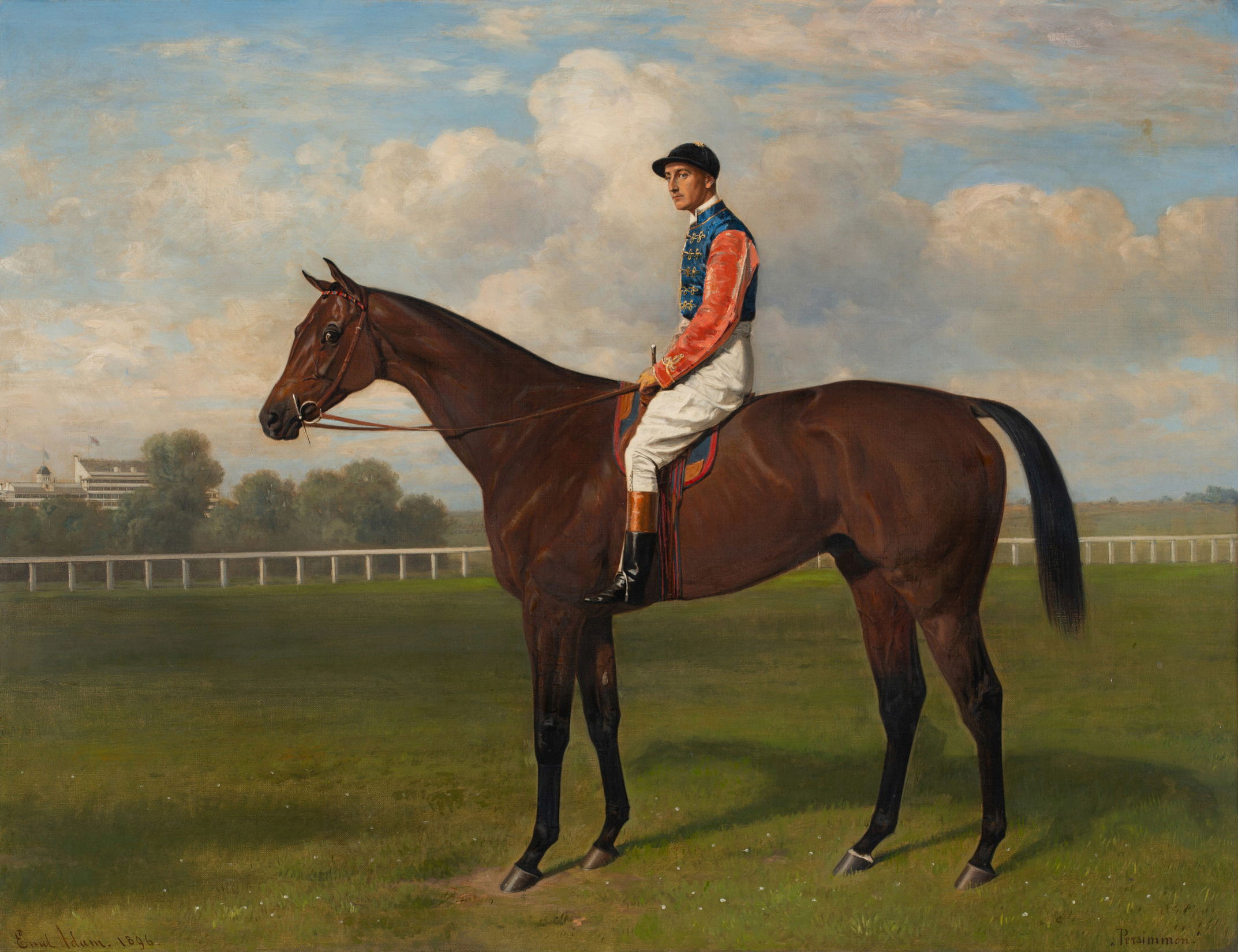
Persimmon, 1896 (in the Royal Collection)

== See also ==
- List of German painters

== Illustrations of works ==
https://artuk.org/discover/artists/adam-emil-18431924
