= Arc de Triomphe du Carrousel =

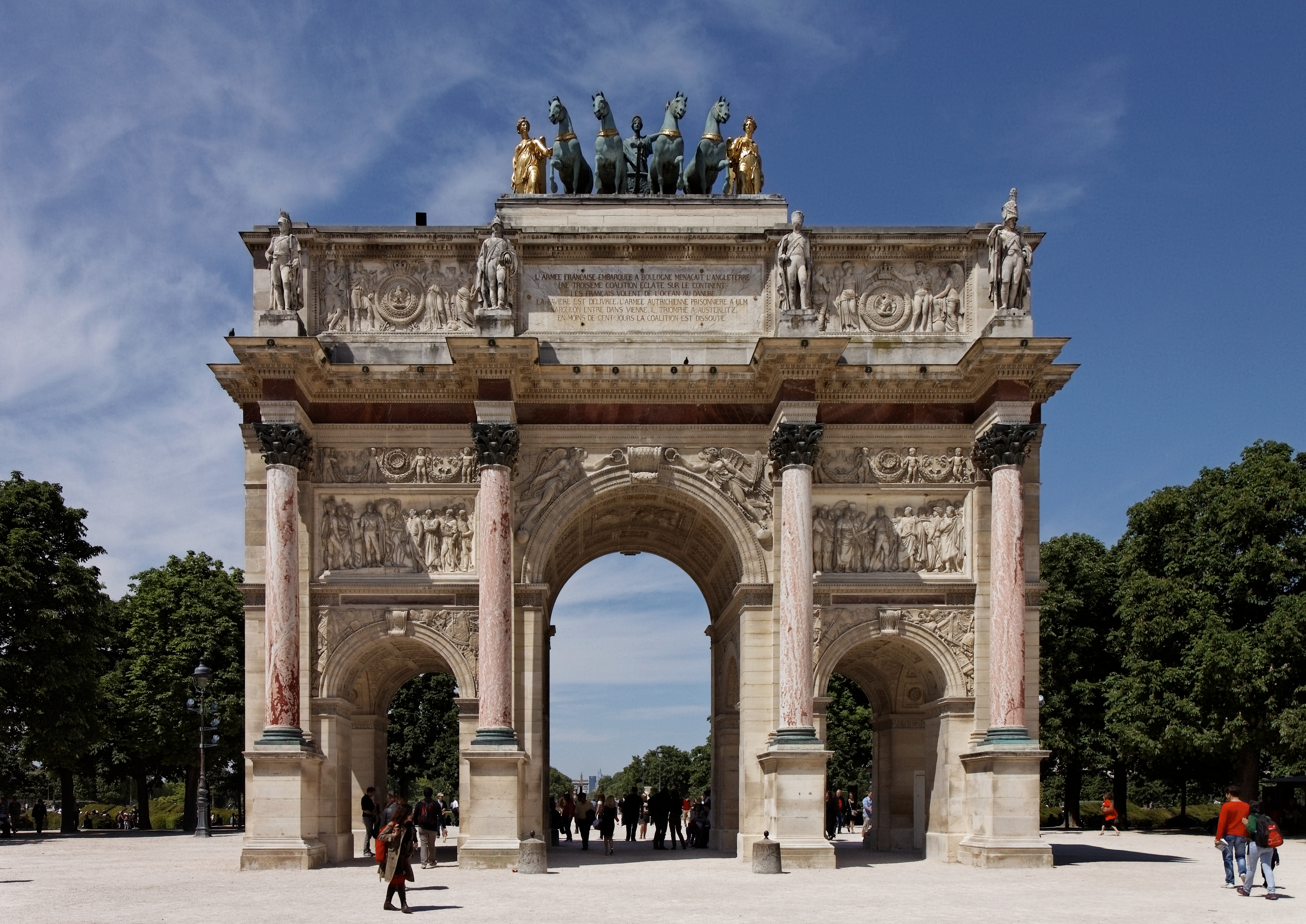
- The Arc de Triomphe du Carrousel
- Interactive map of the Arc de Triomphe du Carrousel area

General information
- Type: Triumphal arch
- Location: Place du Carrousel, Paris, France
- Coordinates: 48°51′42″N 2°19′58″E
- Construction started: 1806
- Completed: 1808

Design and construction
- Architects: Charles Percier, Pierre François Léonard Fontaine

The Arc de Triomphe du Carrousel (French: [aʁk də tʁijɔ̃f dy kaʁuzɛl]; "Triumphal Arch of the Carousel") is a triumphal arch in Paris, located in the Place du Carrousel. It is an example of Neoclassical architecture in the Corinthian order. It was built between 1806 and 1808 to commemorate Napoleon's military victories in the Wars of the Third and Fourth Coalitions. The Arc de Triomphe de l'Étoile, at the far end of the Champs-Élysées, is about twice the size and was designed in the same year but not completed until 1836.

== Description ==
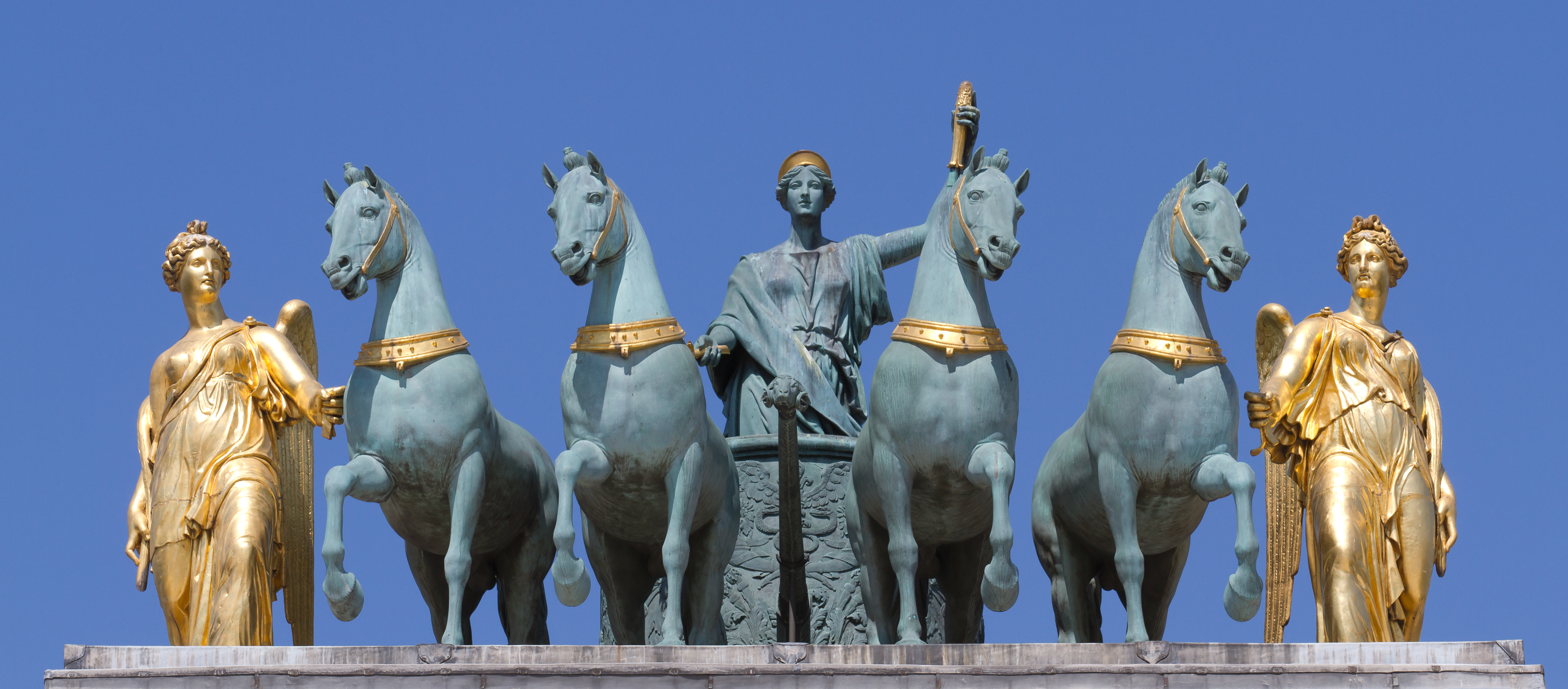
Peace riding in a triumphal chariot

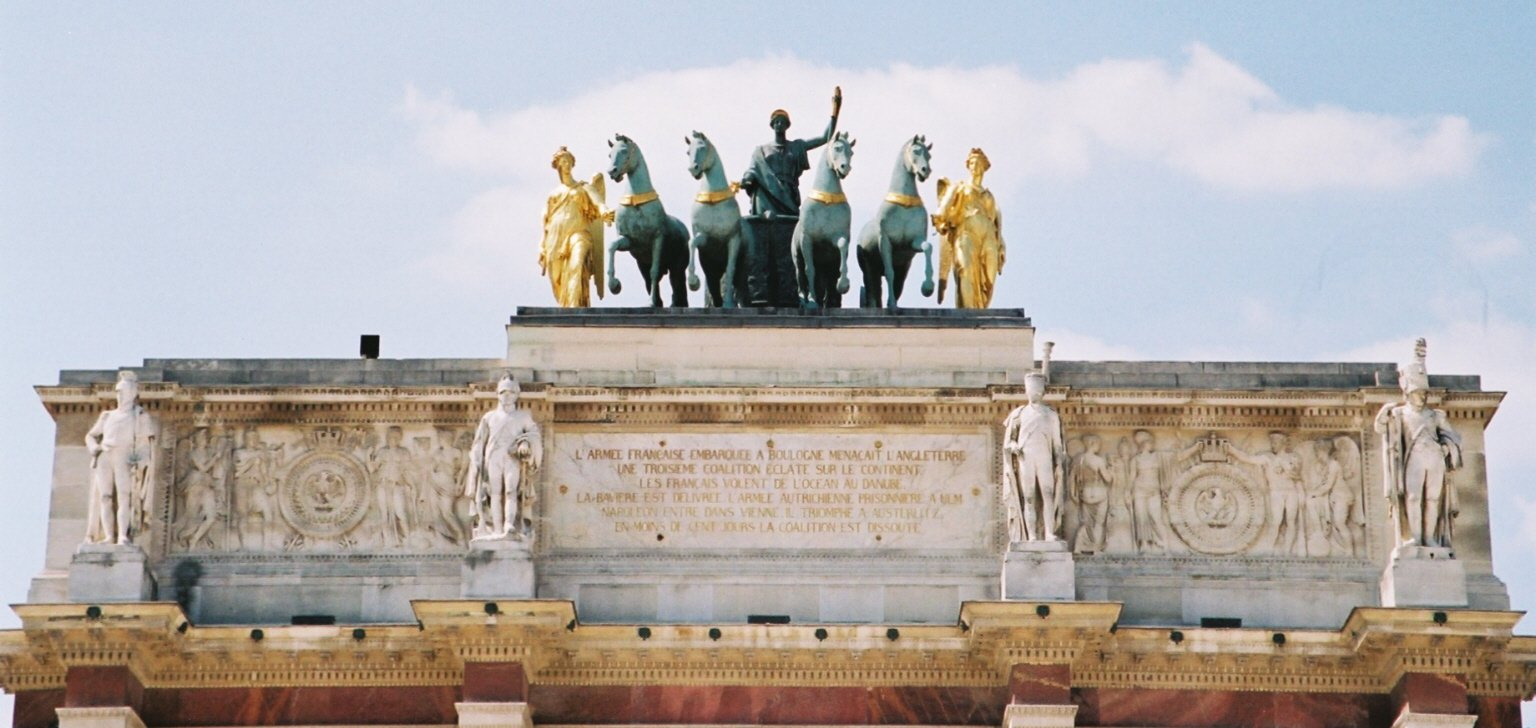
Entablement and quadriga

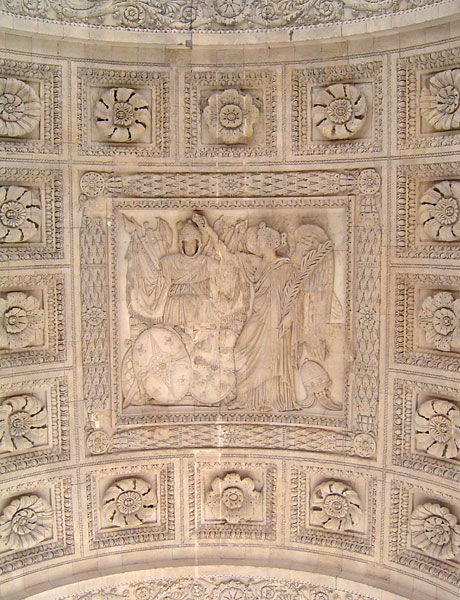
Central bas-relief under the main arch

The monument is 63 feet (19 m) high, 75 feet (23 m) wide, and 24 feet (7.3 m) deep. The 21 feet (6.4 m) high central arch is flanked by two smaller ones, 14 feet (4.3 m) high, and 9 feet (2.7 m) wide. Around its exterior are eight Corinthian columns of marble. These columns were recovered from the Château de Meudon, destroyed in 1804. Each column is topped by eight soldiers of the Empire. On the pediment, between the soldiers, bas-reliefs depict:

- the Arms of the Kingdom of Italy with figures representing History and the Arts
- the Arms of the French Empire with Victory, Fame, History, and Abundance
- Wisdom and Strength holding the arms of the Kingdom of Italy, accompanied by Prudence and Victory.

Napoleon's diplomatic and military victories are commemorated by bas-reliefs executed in rose marble. They depict:

- the Peace of Pressburg
- Napoleon entering Munich
- Napoleon entering Vienna, sculptor Louis-Pierre Deseine
- the Battle of Austerlitz, sculptor Jean-Joseph Espercieux
- the Tilsit Conference
- the surrender of Ulm, sculptor Pierre Cartellier

The arch is derivative of the triumphal arches of the Roman Empire, in particular the Arch of Septimius Severus in Rome. The subjects of the bas-reliefs devoted to the battles were selected by the director of the Musée Napoléon (located at the time in the Louvre), Vivant Denon, and designed by Charles Meynier.

On the top of each of the eight marble columns are marble sculptures that faithfully reproduce the uniforms of the principal corps of Napoleon's imperial army. On the east side (towards the Louvre), the four statues are a cuirassier by Auguste Taunay, a dragoon by Charles-Louis Corbet, a mounted chasseur by Jean-Joseph Foucou and a caribinier by Joseph Chinard. On the west side (towards the Tuileries Gardens), the statues represent a grenadier by Robert-Guillaume Dardel, a line carabinier by Antoine Mouton, a cannonier by Charles-Antoine Bridan and a sapper by Auguste Dumont. The statue of the sapper is the only one that represents a real soldier, fr: Dominique Gaye Mariolle, who was known for his strength and height, which exceeded 2 meters. He is famous for having presented a cannon instead of a rifle during Napoleon's review of his troops prior to the battle of Tilsitt in July 1807.

The quadriga atop the entablement is a copy of the so-called Horses of Saint Mark that adorn the top of the main door of the St Mark's Basilica in Venice.

== History ==
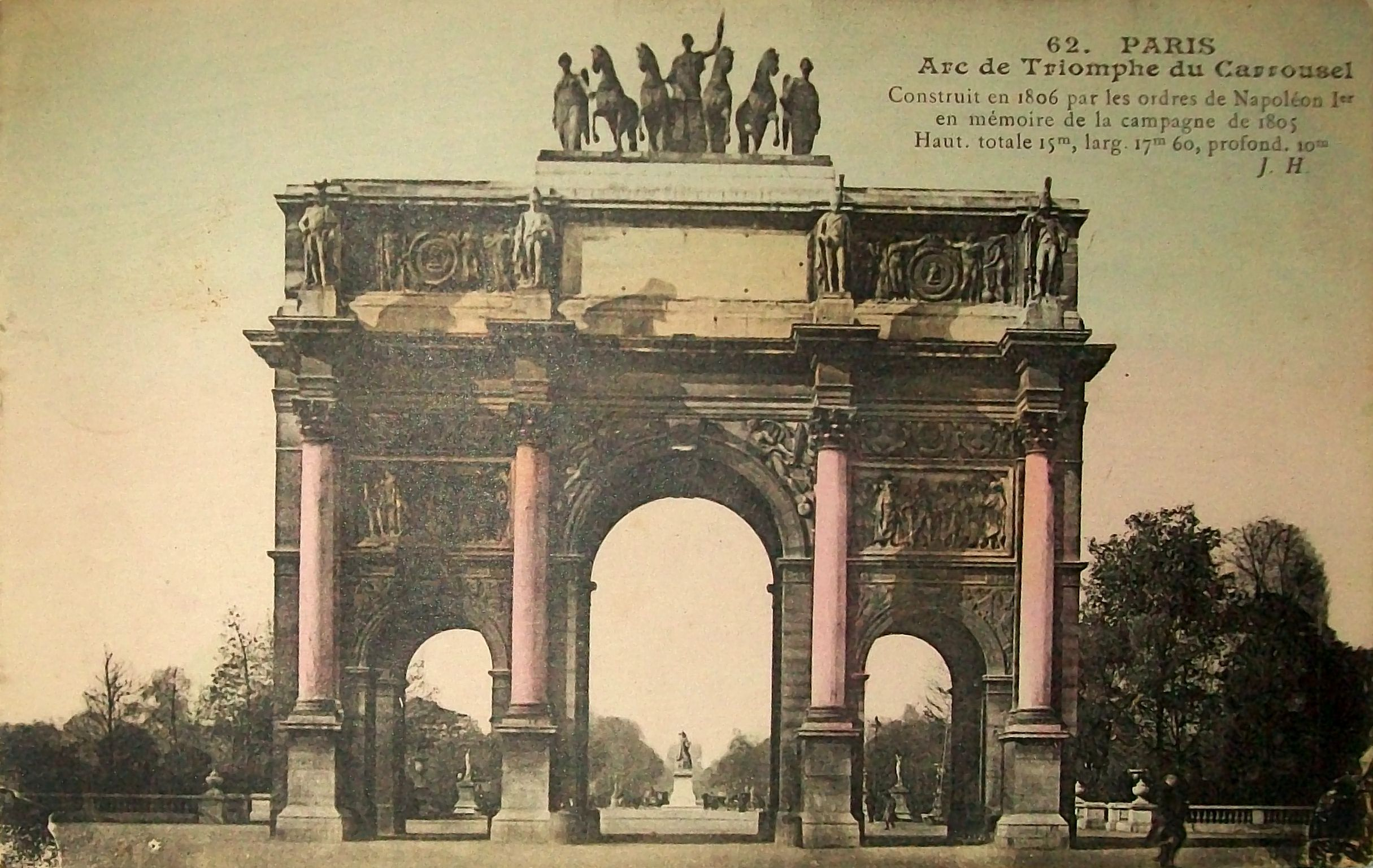
The arc du carrousel Postcard, 1900

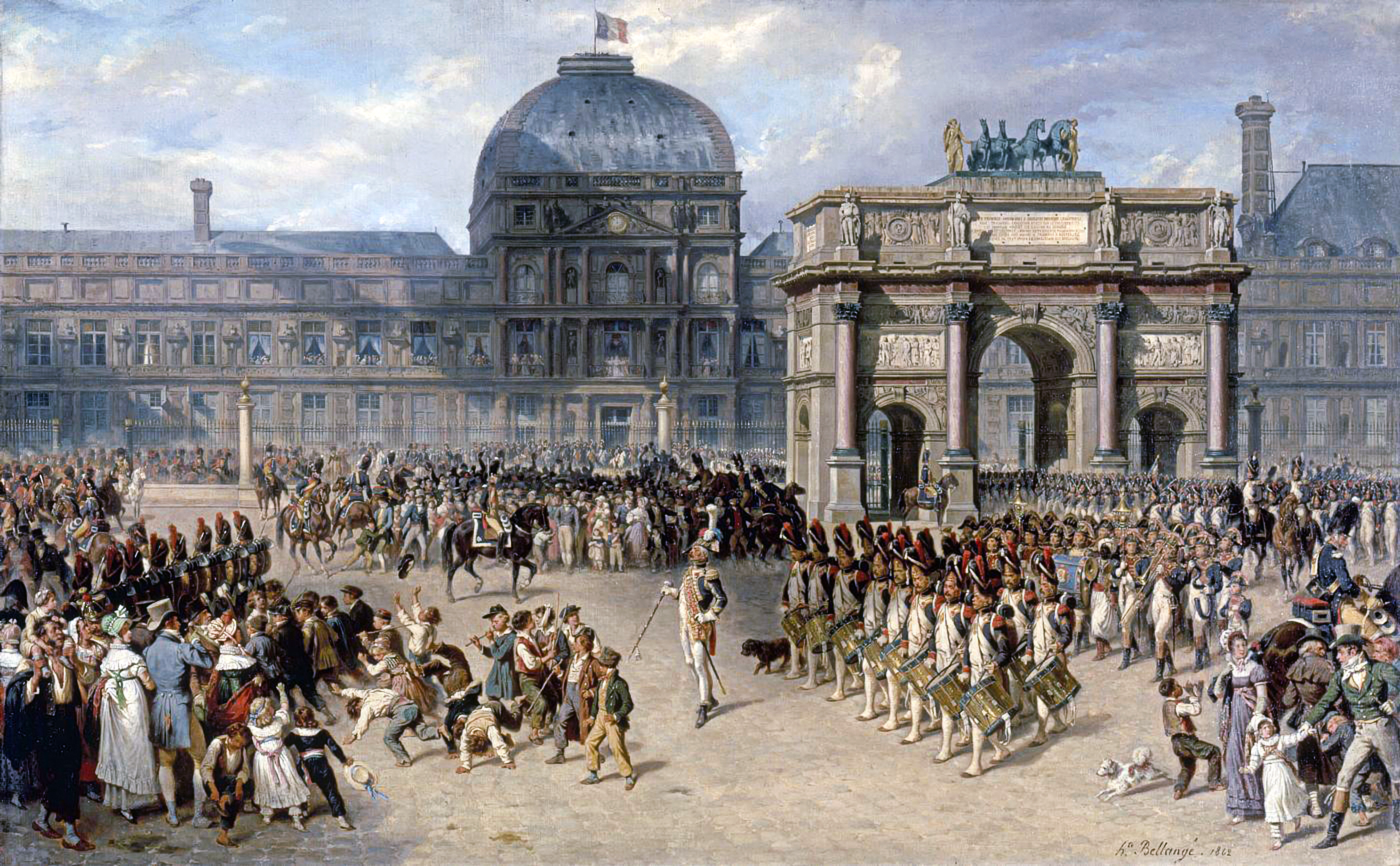
Military review in front of the Tuileries Palace in 1810, by Hippolyte Bellangé. The Arc de Triomphe du Carrousel, which can be seen on the right of this painting, was originally erected as a gateway of the Tuileries palace.

Designed by Charles Percier and Pierre François Léonard Fontaine, the arch was built between 1806 and 1808 by the Emperor Napoleon I, on the model of the Arch of Constantine (312 AD) in Rome, as a gateway of the Tuileries Palace, the Imperial residence. The destruction of the Tuileries Palace during the Paris Commune in 1871, allowed an unobstructed view west towards the Arc de Triomphe.

It was originally surmounted by the Horses of Saint Mark from St Mark's Basilica in Venice, which had been captured in 1798 by Napoleon. In 1815, following the Battle of Waterloo and the Bourbon restoration, France ceded the quadriga to the Austrian Empire which had annexed Venice under the terms of the Congress of Vienna. The Austrians immediately returned the statuary to Venice. The horses of Saint Mark were replaced in 1828 by a quadriga sculpted by Baron François Joseph Bosio, depicting Peace riding in a triumphal chariot led by gilded Victories on both sides. The composition commemorates the Restoration of the Bourbons following Napoleon's downfall.

The Arc du Carrousel inspired the design of Marble Arch, constructed in London between 1826 and 1833.

=== Geography ===
The Arc de Triomphe du Carrousel is at the eastern end of Paris Axe historique ("historic axis"), a nine-kilometre-long linear route which dominates much of the northwestern quadrant of the city.

Looking west, the arch is aligned with the obelisk in the Place de la Concorde, the centerline of the grand boulevard Champs-Élysées, the Arc de Triomphe at the Place de l'Étoile, and, although it is not directly visible from the Place du Carrousel, the Grande Arche de la Défense. Thus, the axis begins and ends with an arch. When the Arc du Carrousel was built, however, an observer in the Place du Carrousel was impeded from any view westward. The central part of the Palais des Tuileries intervened to block the line of sight to the west. When the Tuileries was burned down during the Paris Commune in 1871, and its ruins were swept away, the great axis, as it presently exists, was opened all the way to the Place du Carrousel and the Louvre.
