= Jean-Baptiste d'Huez =

French sculptor (1728–1793)

Jean-Baptiste Cyprien d'Huez
- Born: 1728; Arras, France
- Died: 27 October 1793 (aged 64–65); Paris, France
- Occupation: Sculptor

Jean-Baptiste Cyprien d'Huez (1728 – 27 October 1793) was a French sculptor.

== Early years ==
Jean-Baptiste Cyprien d'Huez was born in Arras in 1728. His younger brother was Charles-Alexandre d'Huez, who became an architect.

Huez studied under Jean-Baptiste Lemoyne. He won the second prize for sculpture in 1751, and shared the second prize in 1752. He won the first prize in 1753. Huez exhibited in the Salons of Paris from 1761 to 1773. Huez exhibited four bas-reliefs at the Salon of 1761 representing eight Virtues carrying garlands. Denis Diderot admired them for their antique style and for their character and draperies.

== Academician ==
Huez was received by the Academy on 30 January 1763. He made a marble statue of Saint Andrew as his reception piece for the Académie royale de peinture et de sculpture, presented on 30 July 1763. It is now held in the Louvre. Four statues were required for the stairway of the Royal Military Academy. Huez was commissioned to make a statue of Maurice de Saxe. The sculptors Félix Lecomte, Louis-Philippe Mouchy and Augustin Pajou were commissioned to make statues of the Grand Condé, Maréchal de Luxembourg and Turenne. The statues were presented together at the Salon of 1773. They were all destroyed in 1792, during the French Revolution. Huez was one of the main artists whose work was included in the collection of the Comédie-Française at the end of the 18th century. Others were Jean-Joseph Foucou, Simon-Louis Boizot, Augustin Pajou and Pierre-François Berruer. Huez became a teacher himself. One of his pupils was Jean-Louis Couasnon (1747–1802).

Huez's teacher, Jean-Baptiste II Lemoyne (1704–1778), started a group "Poetry crying on the bust of Mr. Crebillon" to commemorate the playwright Prosper Jolyot de Crébillon, but did not complete it. It was moved to the antiques room in the Louvre in 1778, where Jean-Baptiste d'Huez continued the work. He made a marble bust of Crébillon that was acquired by the Comédie-Française in 1778. The group was finally completed during the revolutionary period by a pupil of Alexandre Lenoir and is now in the Musée des Beaux-Arts de Dijon. On 7 January 1785, Jean-Pierre Blanchard and Dr. John Jeffries crossed the English Channel in a balloon. Huez was among the sculptors invited to submit sketches for a monument to commemorate the invention, but his submission was not chosen.

Huez died at his home on the Rue des Poulies in Paris on 6 Brumaire II (27 October 1793), aged 65.
