= Louis-Philippe Mouchy =

French sculptor

- Born: 31 March 1734; Paris, France
- Died: 10 December 1801 (aged 67); Paris, France
- Occupation: Sculptor

Louis-Philippe Mouchy (31 March 1734 – 10 December 1801) was a French sculptor.

== Early years ==
Louis-Philippe Mouchy was born in 1734. He was a student of Jean-Baptiste Pigalle, and married Pigalle's niece. Mouchy followed Pigalle's style closely throughout his career. He was given provisional membership of the Académie royale de peinture et de sculpture on 27 September 1766 and was admitted as a full academician on 25 June 1768. His reception piece was Un Berger qui se repose (Shepherd at Rest). Diderot described this work as "a rather literal copy of the first figure one sees to the left when entering the Tuileries from the Pont Royal.

== Academician ==
Mouchy made a statue of Cupid Carving his Darts from the Club of Hercules from an original by Edmé Bouchardon. The copy was installed in a small round Temple of Love built for Marie Antoinette by Richard Mique in the garden of the Petit Trianon. Mouchy collaborated with Simon-Louis Boizot (1743–1809) on statues for Saint-Sulpice. He was more comfortable with realist work, where the subjects were dressed in 17th century costumes, than with the classical style. His marble seated figure of Harpocrates, an ancient god, was criticized as being "spindly", with a head that did not appear noble.

Mouchy was made an assistant professor at the Académie royale, which gave him precedence when the comte d'Angiviller was commissioning statues of prominent Frenchmen for the state after Louis XVI became king in 1774. Only Augustin Pajou received more commissions. Mouchy made busts of Voltaire and Maurice de Saxe for the Marquis de Marigny to decorate his garden. Mouchy accepted a commission from the controller-general, Joseph Marie Terray (1715–78), for a statue of Apollo, representing the Arts. It was to be paired with Pajou's statue of Mercury, representing commerce. After Terray died his collection was auctioned off in January 1779. Neither statue was complete, and they had to be viewed in the sculptors' studios.

Mouchy's son-in-law was the painter and engraver Philibert-Louis Debucourt. In the marriage contract Mouchy generously offered to provide a three-room apartment at the Louvre, where Debucourt lived for twelve and a half years. Mouchy died in 1801.

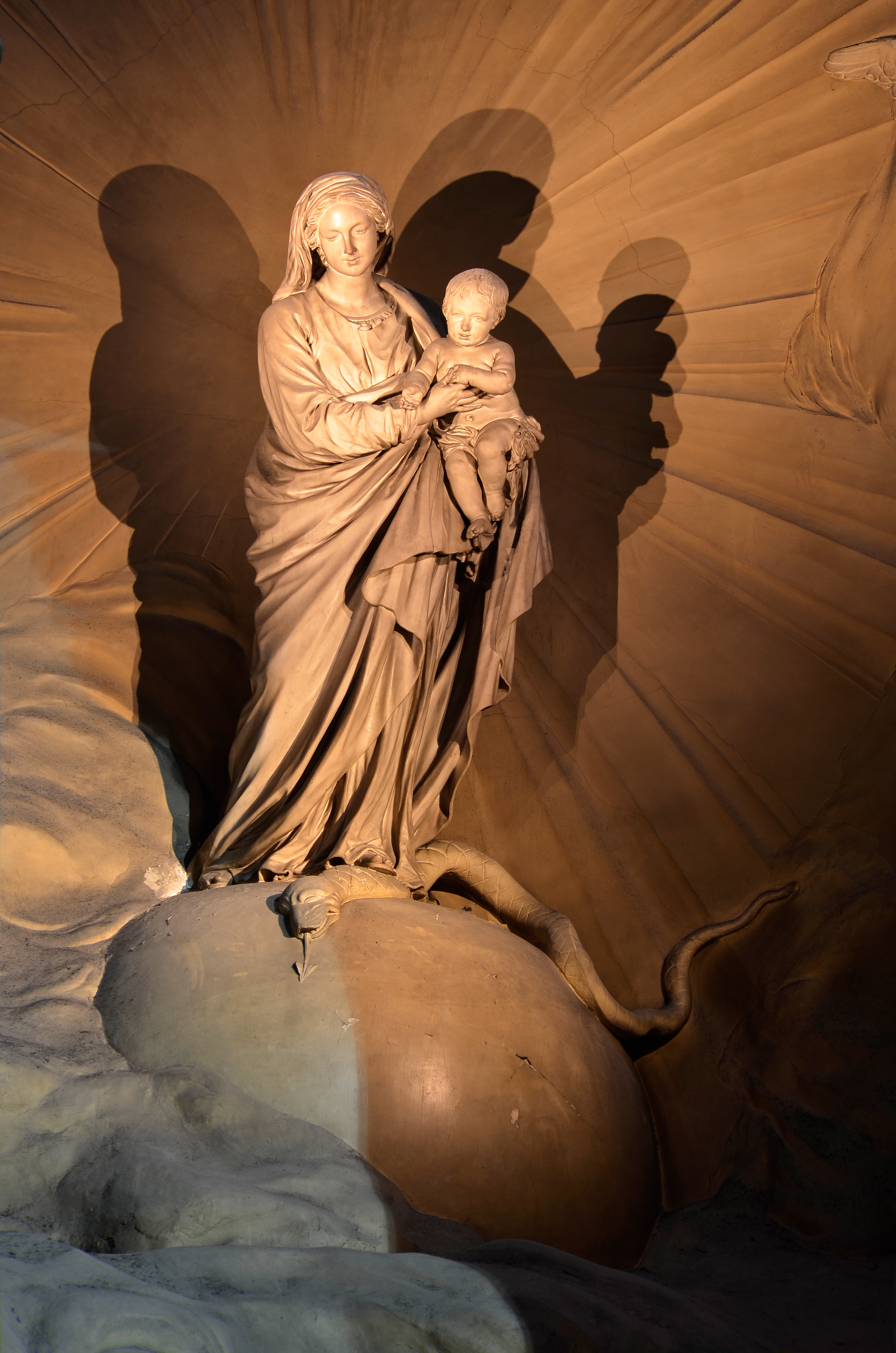
Statue of Mary by Pigalle at Saint-Sulpice. The stucco decoration is by Mouchy

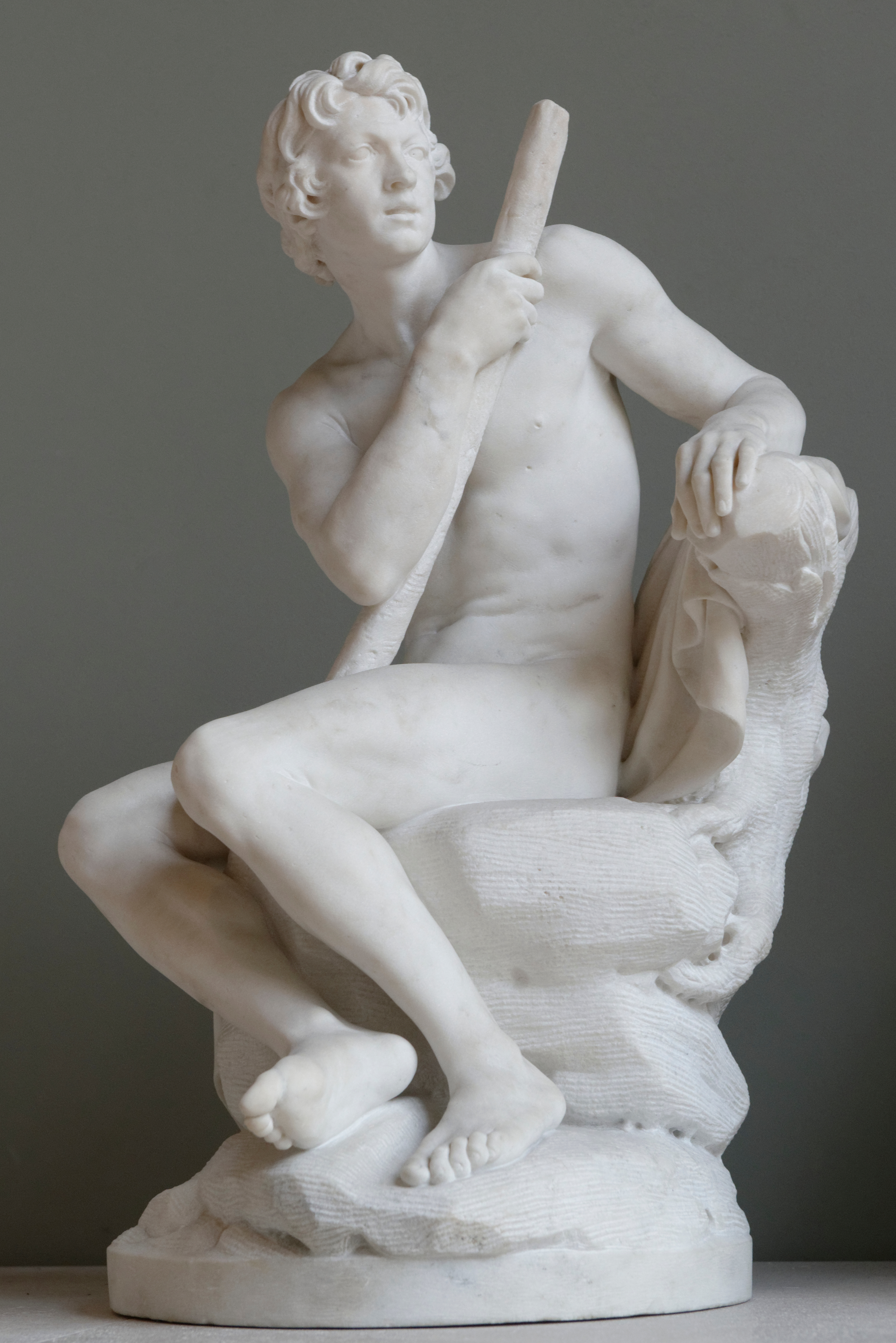
Seated shepherd, Mouchy's reception piece for the Academy

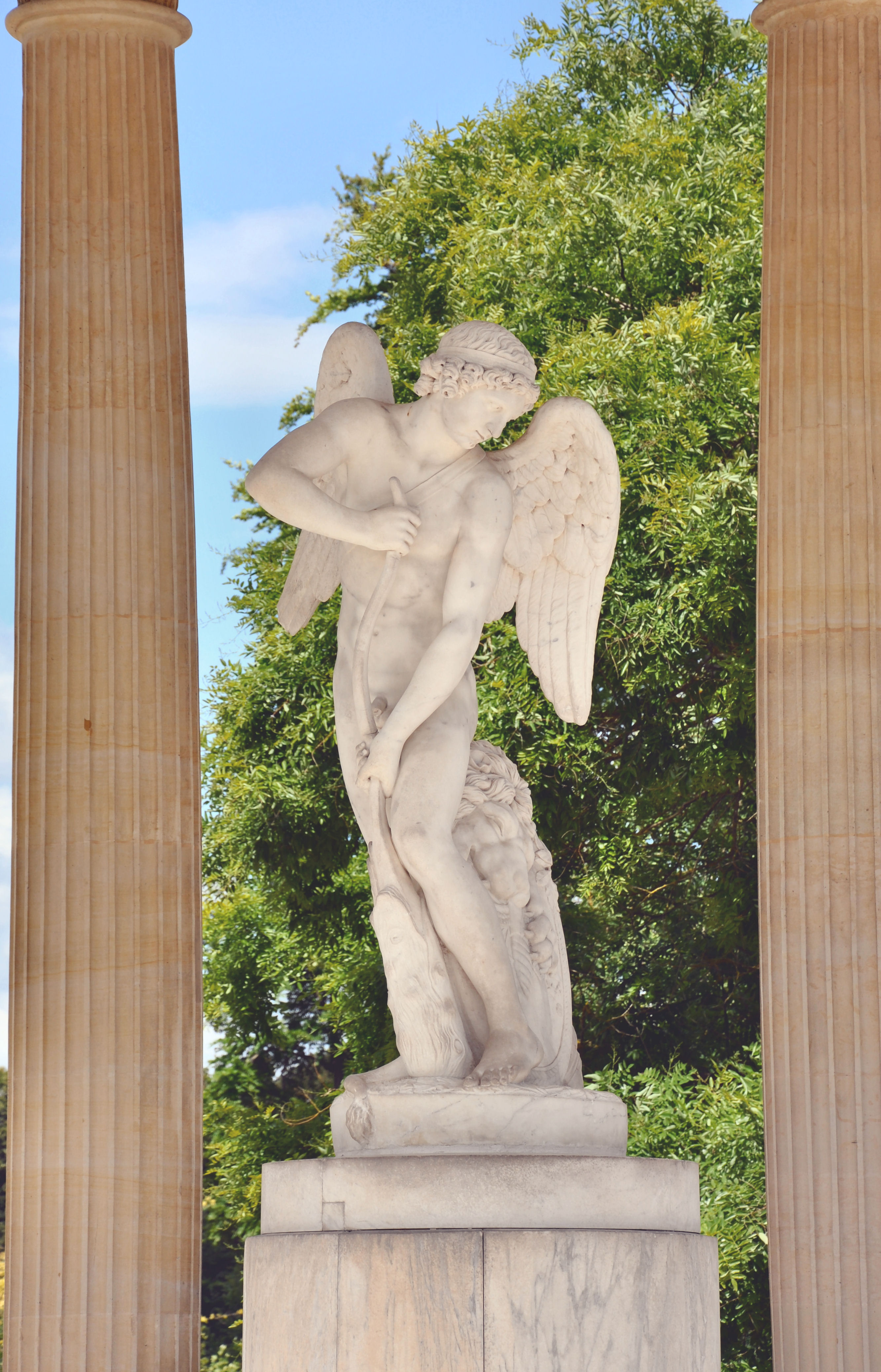
Cupid Carving his Darts from the Club of Hercules

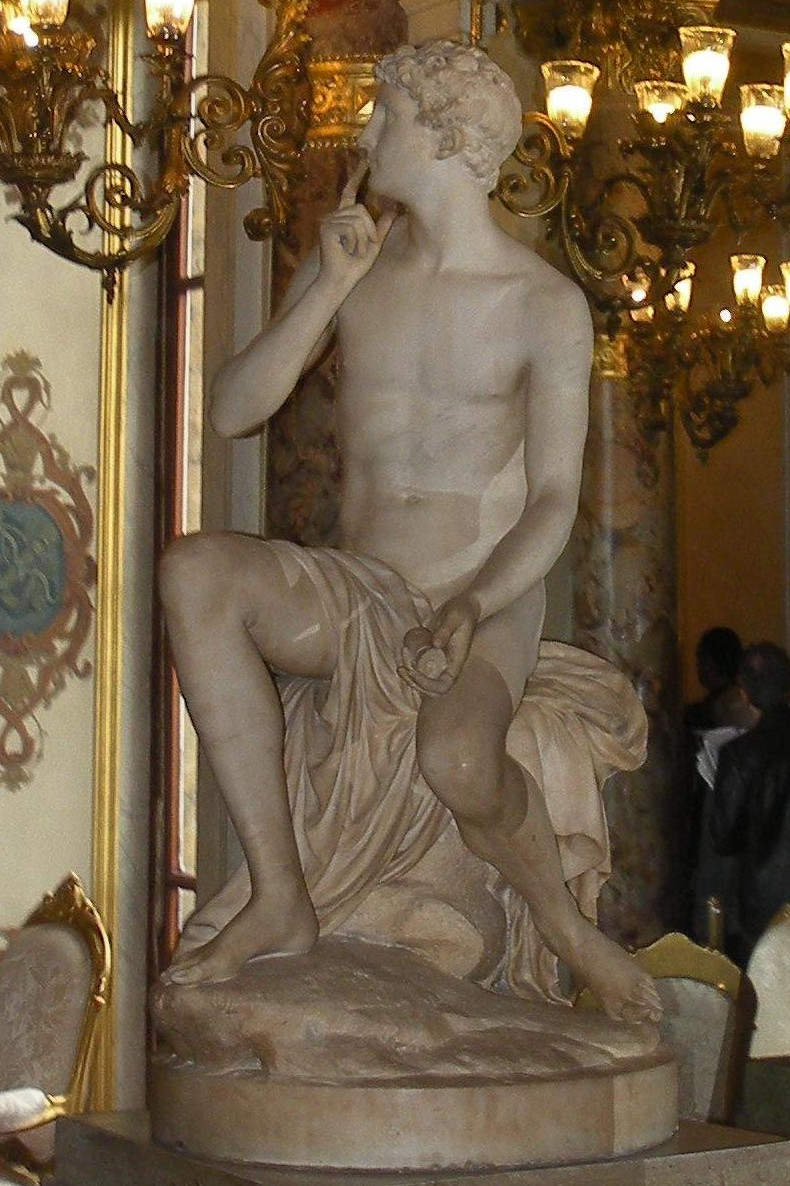
Harpocrates, god of silence
