= Neptune (Pajou) =

1767 marble sculpture by Augustin Pajou

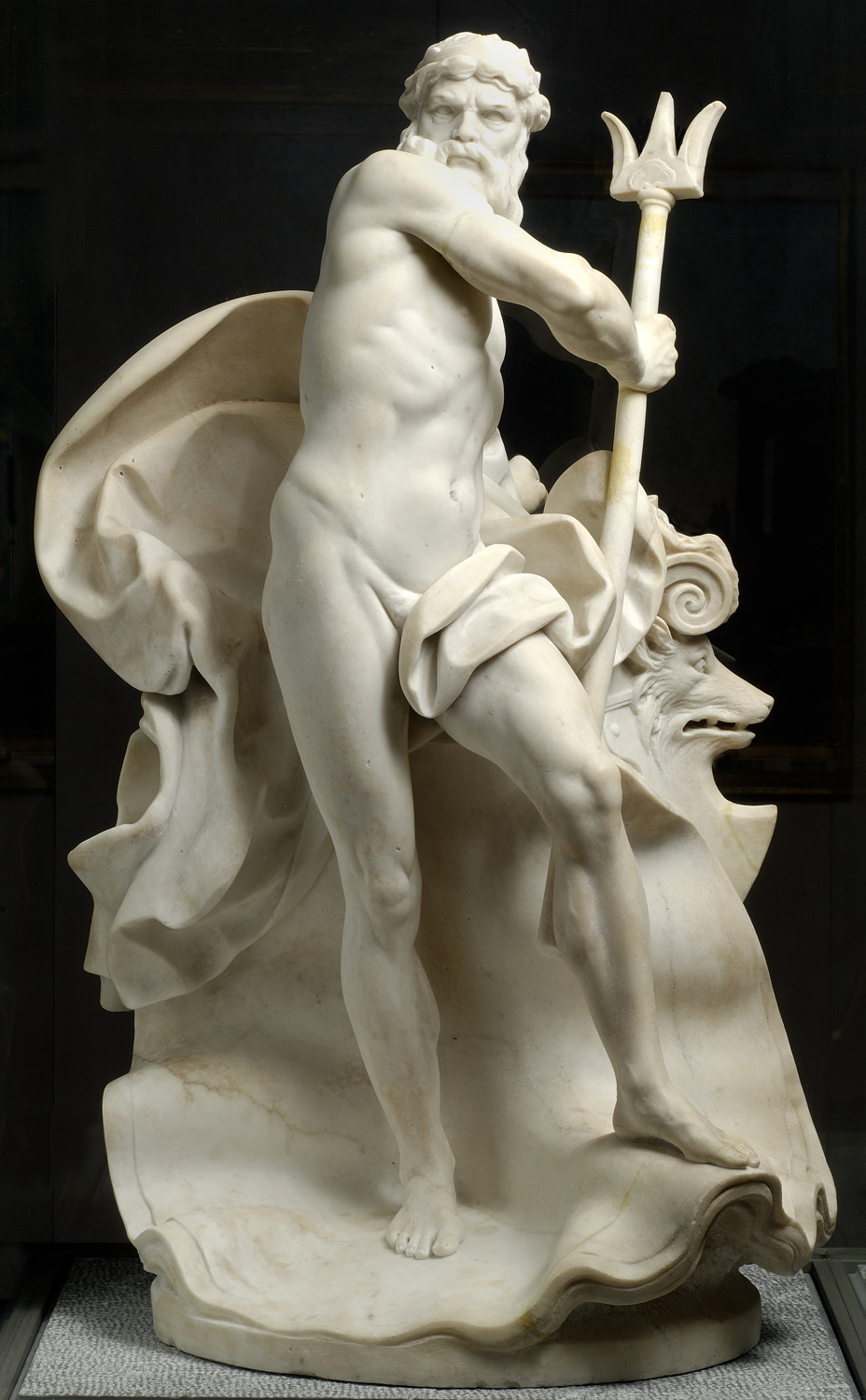

Neptune, Neptune Calming the Waves or Irritated Neptune is a 1767 marble sculpture of Neptune by the French artist Augustin Pajou, now in the Museum of Fine Arts of Lyon. He produced a terracotta modello for the work.

== Bibliography ==
- Philippe Durey, Le Neptune d’A. Pajou et le buste du chancelier d’Aguesseau de J-B Stouf au musée des Beaux-Arts de Lyon
