= Charles-Louis Corbet =

French sculptor

Charles Louis Corbet
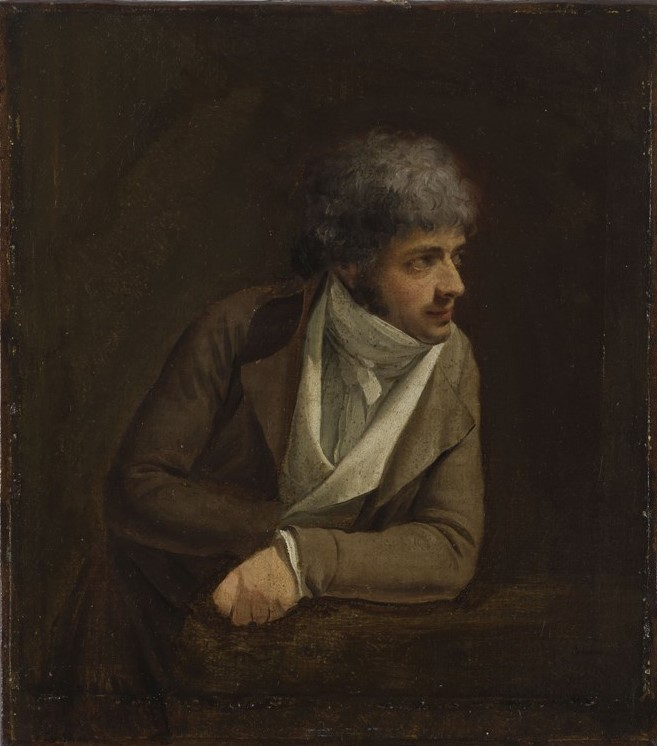
- Portrait by Louis-Léopold Boilly, c. 1800
- Born: January, 1758; Douai, France
- Died: 10 December 1808 (aged 50); Paris, France
- Occupation: Sculptor
- Known for: Bust of Napoleon

Charles-Louis Corbet (January 1758 – 10 December 1808) was a French sculptor. He is known for a bust that he made of Napoleon and a statue of a French Dragoon on the Arc de Triomphe du Carrousel.

== Early years ==
Charles Louis Corbet was born in 1758 in Douai, and baptized in the parish of Saint-Pierre on 27 January 1758. His mother was not married. He studied in Douai, than in Paris in the studio of the sculptor Pierre-François Berruer. He won a medal from the Académie Royal. In 1780, when he was twenty-two, he had moved to Lille, where he was accepted by the Academy on the presentation of one of his modeled works. He was definitely named an Academician after he completed the Mort de Méléagre. Between 1782 and 1790 he made many bas-relief portraits and busts, often in terracotta. In 1790 he made a terracotta bust of Louis XVI.

== French Revolution ==
Corbet was an enthusiastic supporter of the French Revolution, which began in 1789. Corbet was made librarian of the École Centrale in October 1793, and held this position for at least five years. He was commissioned to create a statue representing Liberty, and completed a plaster model in September 1794. He asked for three years to complete a marble statue. This work was never started. In the year IV he was sent on a mission to Belgium by the representative Briet, for a purpose that is not known. There are few records of works of art created by Corbet in the period from 1793 to 1799.

== Later years ==
Corbet was given a commission by the government to execute a bust of the young general Bonaparte. The first plaster model, 33 inches (840 mm) high, was exhibited in the Salon of July 1798, with the inscription "... fait d'après nature". The sittings must have taken place between 5 December 1797, when Bonaparte returned from Italy, and 4 May 1798 when he left for Egypt. The bust portrays Napoleon as a handsome and heroic figure. At the Salon of 1800 Corbet presented a marble version of the bust of General Bonaparte, executed on the orders of the Directory during the Egyptian campaign. Signed plaster copies with dates from Year VI (1797) to Year VIII (1800) are held in the Château de Malmaison, Palace of Versailles, Carnavalet Museum, Musée de l'Armée, Palais des Beaux-Arts de Lille, and Musée Masséna in Nice. Bronze casts were made, and marble copies were created in the Second French Empire.

Having moved permanently to Paris, in 1801 Corbet exhibited a huge bust of the French Republic, which earned him an honorable mention. Two years later he completed a marble copy of the bust of Napoleon, now the First Consul, which earned much acclaim. This version of the bust was more polished but had less life than the original. He was charged with creating the statue of a French dragoon for the Arc de Triomphe du Carrousel, and a statue of general Caffarelli for the Senate stairway, which was exhibited in the Salon of 1806 along with a bust of General Béraud, also commissioned by the government. Corbet died in 1808. He was unmarried, and left no children.

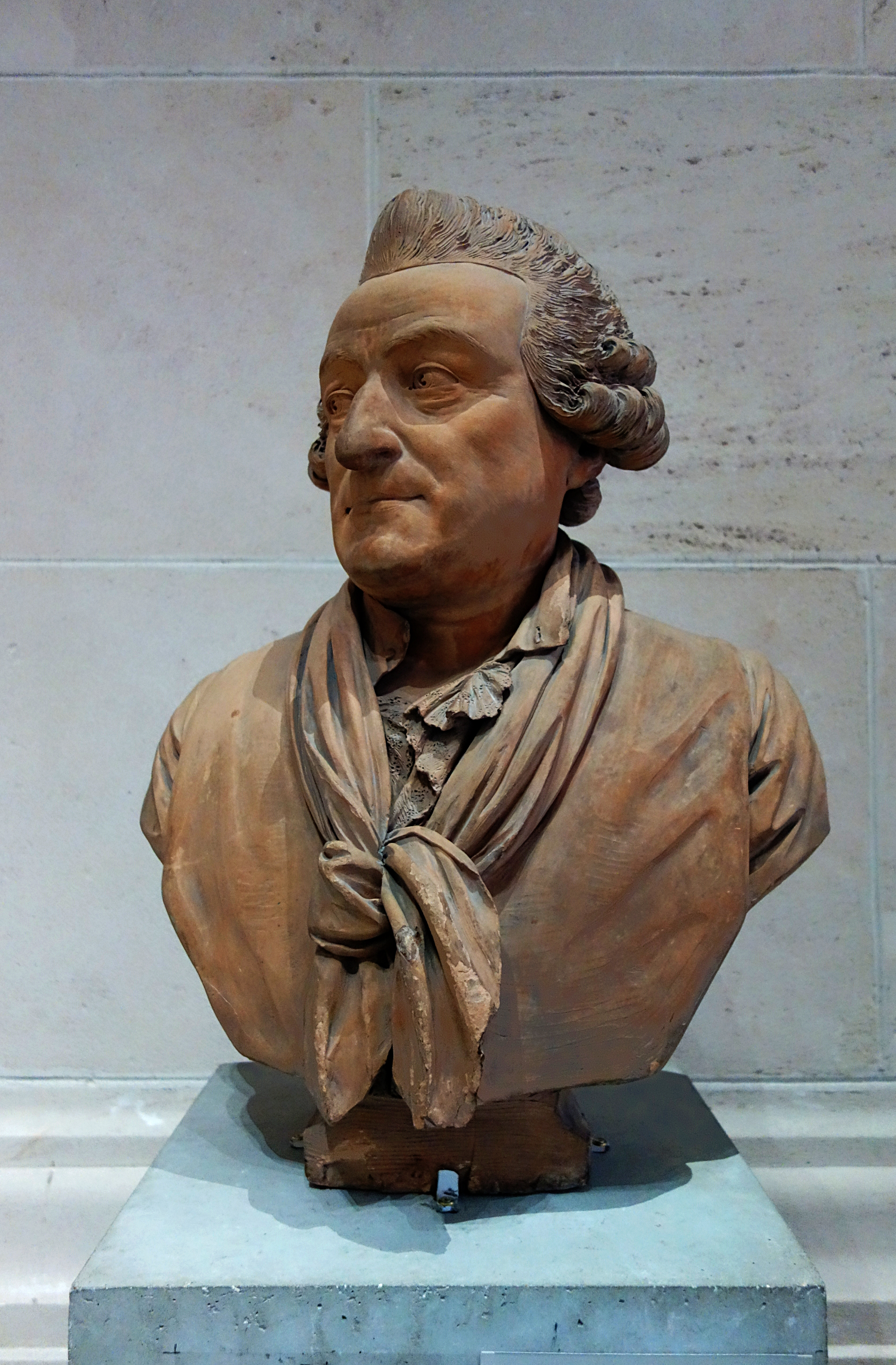
Bust of the architect Thomas-Joseph Gombert (1782)

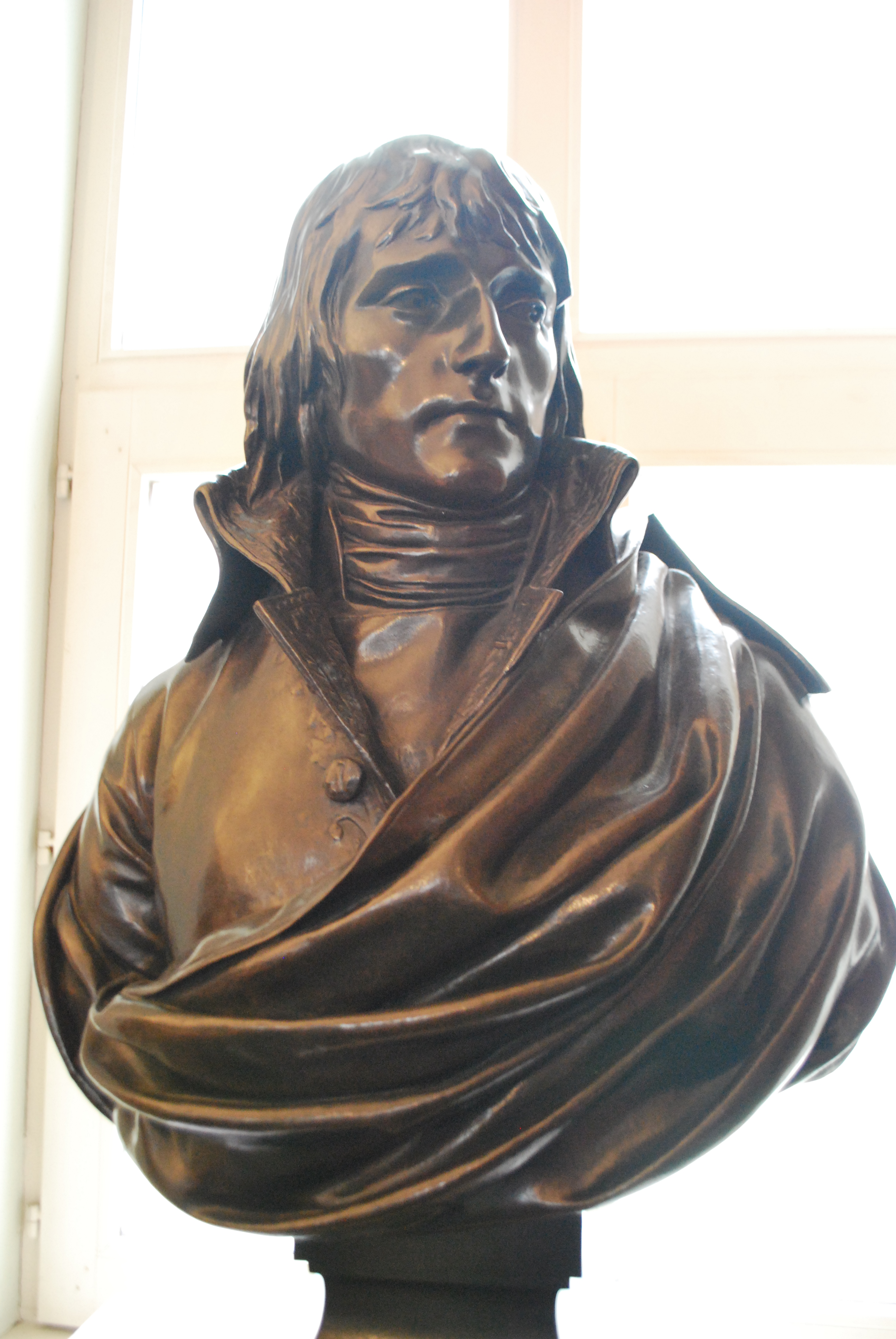
Bust of Napoleon, Musée des Canonniers, Lille (1798)

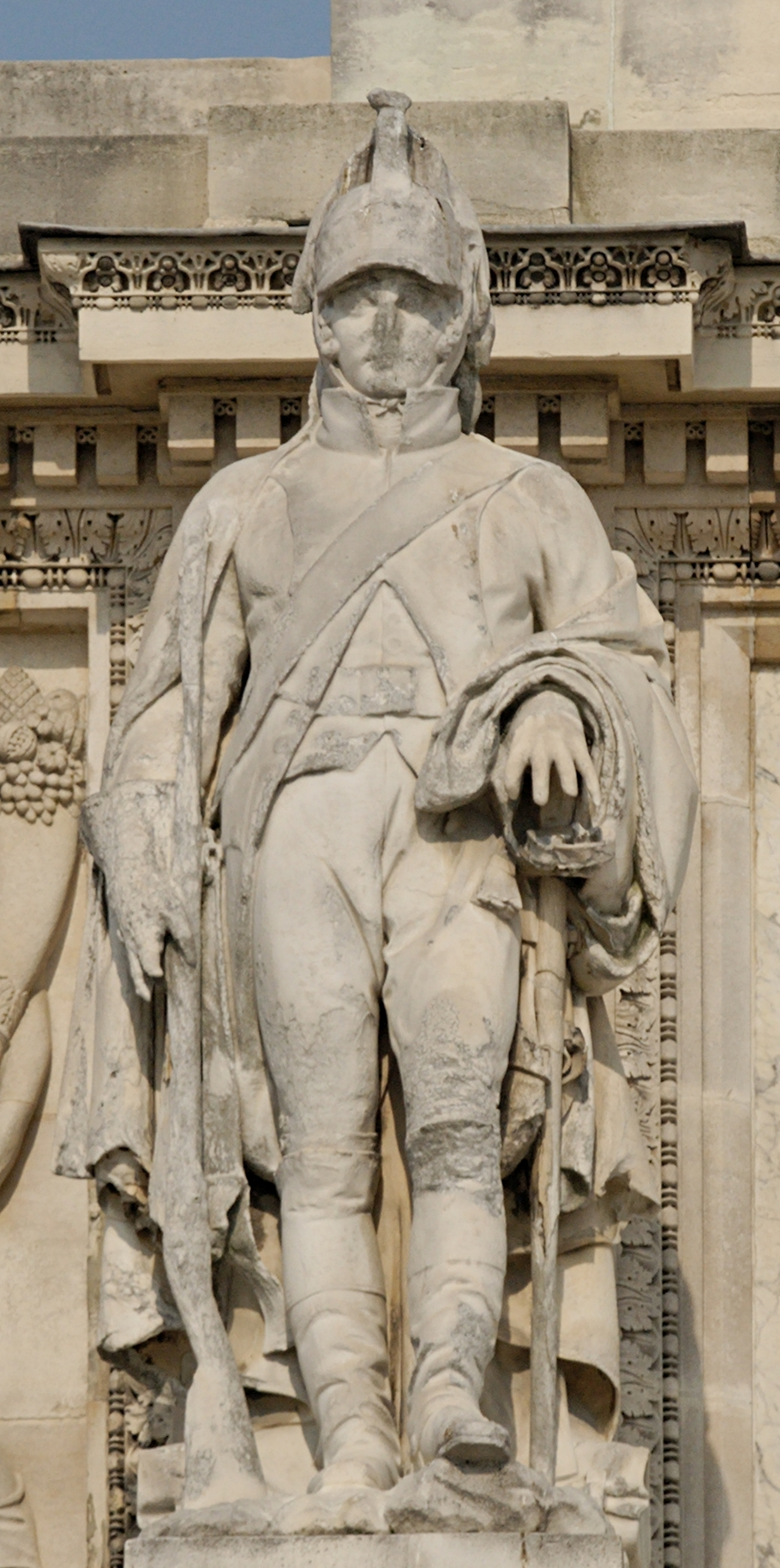
Dragoon on the Arc de Triomphe du Carrousel (1806)
