= Jean-Louis Couasnon =

French sculptor

- Born: 1707; Culan, Cher, France
- Died: 1802 (aged 94–95)
- Occupation: Sculptor

Jean-Louis Couasnon (1747-1802) was a French sculptor who specialized in portraits of living people.

== Life ==
Jean-Louis Couasnon was born in Culan, Cher, in 1747. He studied under the sculptor Jean-Baptiste d'Huez. In 1777 he was working for the Menus-Plaisirs du Roi, for whom he made painted cartoons of Louis XVI and Marie Antoinette He exhibited at the Salon de la Correspondance in 1779 and in 1785. He exhibited at the Salons du Louvre from 1795 to 1802. Couasnon died in 1802.

== Style ==
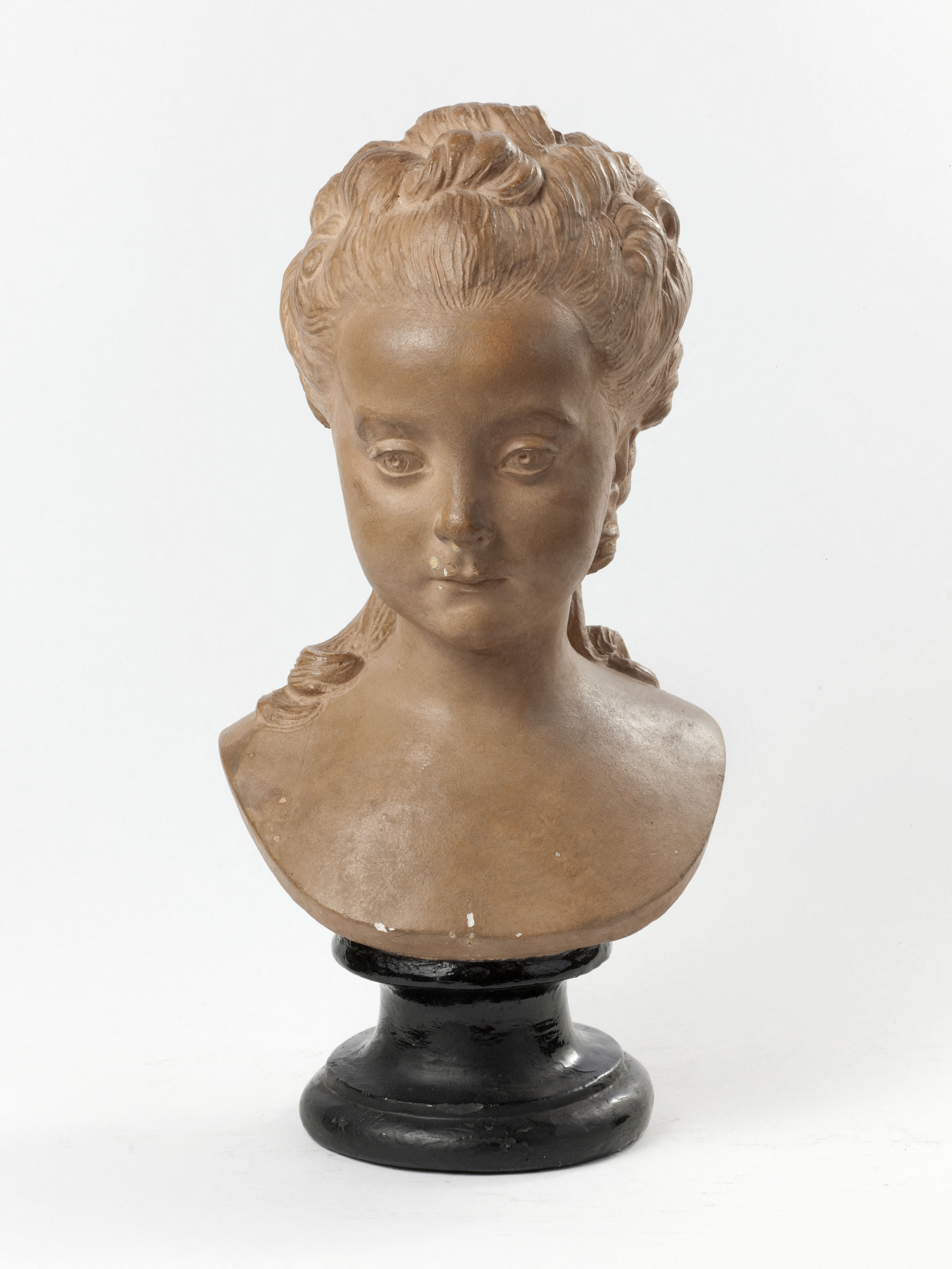
Charlotte de Grouchy (musée Carnavalet)

Couasnon specialized in portraiture, particularly of children, and rendered their expressions with great sweetness and resemblance. His work recalls that of Jean-Antoine Houdon. Couasnon made a bust of Alexandrine Émilie Brogniart (b. 1780), daughter of the architect and designer Alexandre-Théodore Brongniart, when she was aged four. Houdon made portraits of Émilie's older siblings. Couasnon rendered the eyes in same way, with bowl-shaped irises and deeply carved pupils, but in contrast to Houdon's masterful work the hair is stiff and the dress is complicated. His portrait of the poet Jean-Baptiste de Santeul is said to be his masterpiece.

== Selected works ==
- 1782 Portrait de Madame Perriere de Mausny
- 1784 Bust of the four-year-old Alexandrine-Émilie Brongniart (1780-1847) (Louvre).
- 1775 Portrait of Charlotte de Grouchy (musée Carnavalet)
- 1784 Portrait of François-Benoît-Fortuné de Pluvié, dit Guibert (1779-1799), aged five (Louvre)
- 1790 (circa) "Portrait de Gérard de Visme"
