= Pierre Petitot =

French artist (1760–1840)

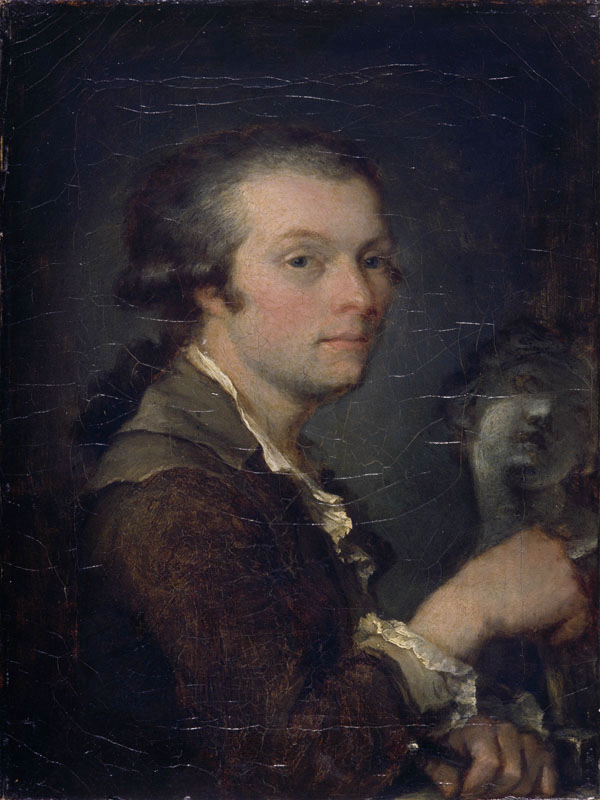
Portrait of Petitot by Pierre-Paul Prud'hon, believed to have been painted while both artists were on their Prix de Rome (between 1785 and 1788)

Pierre Petitot (11 December 1760, in Langres – 7 November 1840, in Paris) was a French sculptor.

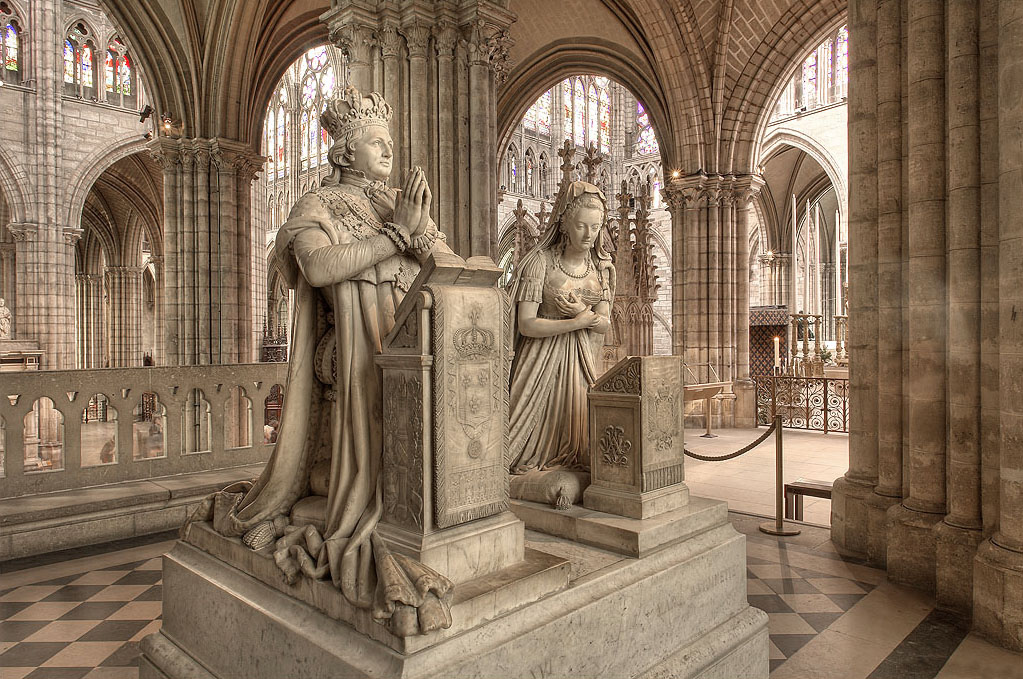
Funerary monuments of King Louis XVI and Queen Marie Antoinette (not their graves) by Petitot and Edme Gaulle, at the Basilica of Saint-Denis

Petitot initially studied under Claude François Devosge at the École des Beaux-Arts in Dijon. In 1788 he won the first major sculpture prize founded by the States of Burgundy, which allowed him to travel and stay in Rome. His award-winning statue was on display in the Musée des Beaux-Arts de Dijon. After he returned to France, he was imprisoned on suspicion of being a counter-revolutionary, and was freed after the fall of Robespierre on 27 July 1794. He regularly exhibited at the Salon (Paris) until 1819. He worked with Pierre Cartellier and Joseph Espercieux. The Museum of Dijon has an oil on canvas portrait of him painted by the artist Pierre-Paul Prud'hon, and The Louvre also contains some of his works.
