= Pierre-François Berruer =

French sculptor (1733–1797)

- Born: 1733; Paris, France
- Died: 4 April 1797 (aged 63–64); Paris, France
- Occupation: Sculptor
- Known for: Statues on facade of the Grand-Théâtre of Bordeaux.

Pierre-François Berruer (1733 – 4 April 1797) was a French sculptor. He is known for the twelve statues that decorate the front of the Grand Théâtre de Bordeaux.

== Early years ==
Pierre François Berruer was born in Paris in 1733. In 1754 he won the second prize of the Prix de Rome after Charles-Antoine Bridan (1730–1808) with his Le Massacre des Innocents. He won the first prize in 1756, tied with André-Jean Lebrun (1737–1811), with his Abraham et Melchisédech. This gained him a scholarship to the Villa Medici in Rome from 1758 to 1764. He was a pupil of Étienne Maurice Falconet (1716–1791) and René-Michel Slodtz (1705–1764). After returning to France, Berruer was admitted to the Académie royale de peinture et de sculpture in 1765.

== Career ==
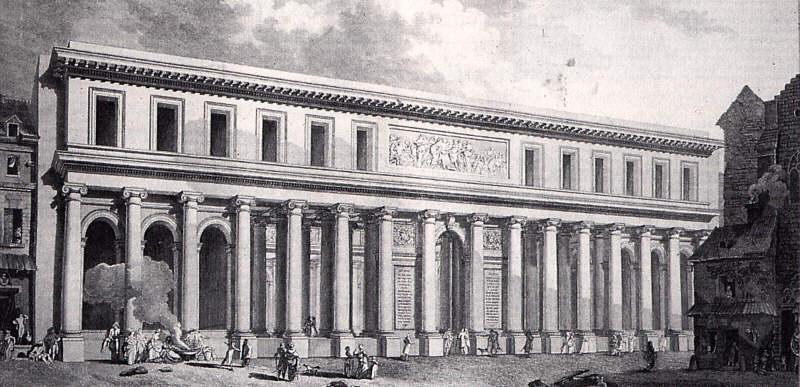
École de Chirurgie, showing Berruer's relief panel above the central entrance.

In 1767 Berruer made a marble statue of Hebe holding a cup and vase for the Duc de Choiseul. In the Salon of 1771 Berruer exhibited a proposal for the tomb of Marshal the Comte de Harcourt in Nôtre-Dame, following the maudlin taste of the time. According to the Mercure de France, "Monsieur Berruer's plan for a mausoleum for the late comte de Harcourt has been conceived with warmth and will be viewed with interest, because it will make one consider the tender wife who throws herself in front of Death in order to save her husband from the blow that is about to be struck against him."

Berruer designed a long relief panel for the facade of the École de Chirurgie in Paris, built in 1769–74. The panel is placed above the entablature of the Ionic order and below the upper cornice. It shows King Louis XV, followed by Minerva and surrounded by the sick, commanding that the school be built. Architecture, Surgery, Vigilance and Providence are also depicted on the panel. After the church of Ste-Geneviève, the school was the most admired building of the period.

Berruer made two busts of the engraver Jacques Roëttiers, one dated 1772–73 and the other 1774–75. In 1781 he made a bust of Philippe Néricault Destouches of the Académie française, which was installed at the Comédie-Française. He was one of the main artists whose work was included in the collection of the Comédie-Française at the end of the 18th century. Others were Jean-Baptiste d'Huez, Jean-Joseph Foucou, Simon-Louis Boizot and Augustin Pajou.

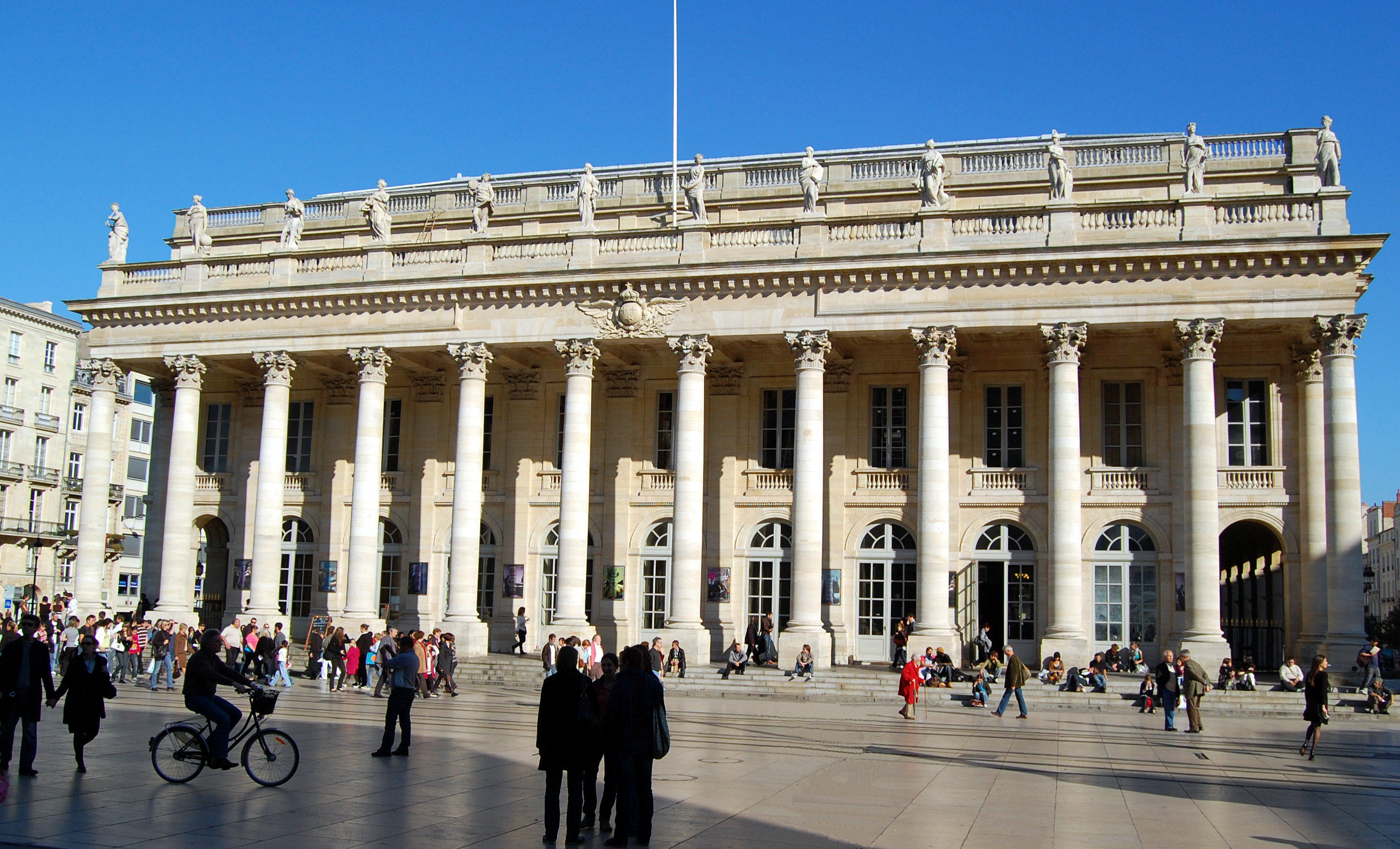
Grand Théatre of Bordeaux, with Berruer's statues above the columns.

Berruer was named a professor at the École des Beaux-Arts in Paris in 1785. His pupils included Charles-Louis Corbet (1758–1808). His best known works are the statue of Chancelier d'Aguesseau at the Palace of Versailles and the twelve stone statues of 2.3 metres (7 ft 7 in) on the peristyle of the facade of the Grand Théâtre de Bordeaux. They represent nine muses and three goddesses. He completed four himself and entrusted his assistant Van den Drix the task of carving the others from models that he had made.

Pierre François Berruer married Anne-Catherine Ménagé. He died at home in the Cour du Museum in the 4th arrondissement of Paris on 15 Germinal V (4 April 1797). He was aged 63.

== Selected works ==
Works include:

- Bordeaux :
  - Grand Théâtre de Bordeaux, facade : Nine muses and three goddesses, 1780,
  - Musée des Beaux-Arts : Hébé, 1767, terracotta,
- Chartres, Chartres Cathedral :
  - Charity and Hope, high relief in the choir,
  - Faith and Humility, high relief in the choir,
  - The Baptism of Christ, bas-relief,
  - The Annunciation, bas-relief,
- Paris :
  - École de Chirurgie, relief on the front : Theory and Practice swear eternal union, 1780,
  - The Louvre : Louis XV rewards Painting and Sculpture, 1770, bas-relief in marble,
- Versailles, Palace of Versailles : Henri d'Aguesseau, Chancellor of France, c. 1779, marble,
- Unknomn location :
  - Bacchic scene, 1784,
  - Bust of the engraver Jacques Roëttiers, terracotta in 1773, marble in 1775,
  - Nymph of Sincerity holding a dove in her hands.
