= Philibert-Louis Debucourt =

French painter (1755–1832)

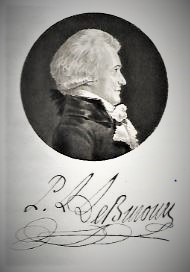
Self-portrait and signature (before 1800)

Philibert-Louis Debucourt (13 February 1755 – 22 September 1832) was a French painter and engraver.

== Life ==
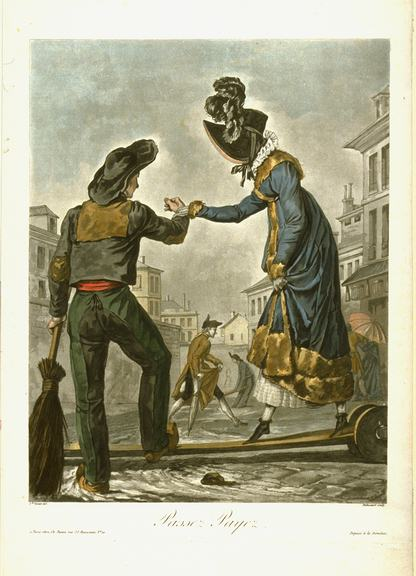
Passez Payez, aquatint from a Carle Vernet portrait (1818), now at the University of Michigan Museum of Art

Debucourt was born in Paris in 1755, and became a pupil of Joseph-Marie Vien. He executed a few plates in mezzotint, such as the Heureuse famille, the Benediction de la mariée, and the Cruche cassée, after his own designs. Most of his work was, however, in aquatint. He became the leading maker of multi-plate colour prints, combining washes of aquatint with line-engraving. He used a number of different techniques, but most involved three colour plates, and a fourth key plate, outlining the design in black.

Debucourt's father-in-law was the sculptor Louis-Philippe Mouchy. In the marriage contract Mouchy generously offered to provide a three-room apartment at the Louvre, where Debucourt lived for twelve and a half years. The address of this apartment is often given on his prints. Some of his work was satirical, such as La promenade publique, an aquatint of 1792 showing a crowd in the gardens the Palais-Royal. As well as work from his own designs, he made aquatints after Carle Vernet, including the Horse Frightened by a Lion, the Horse Frightened by Lightning and the Strayed Huntsman.

Debucourt was assisted for some years by his pupil and nephew, Jean-Pierre-Marie Jazet. He died at Belleville in 1832.

== Selected works ==
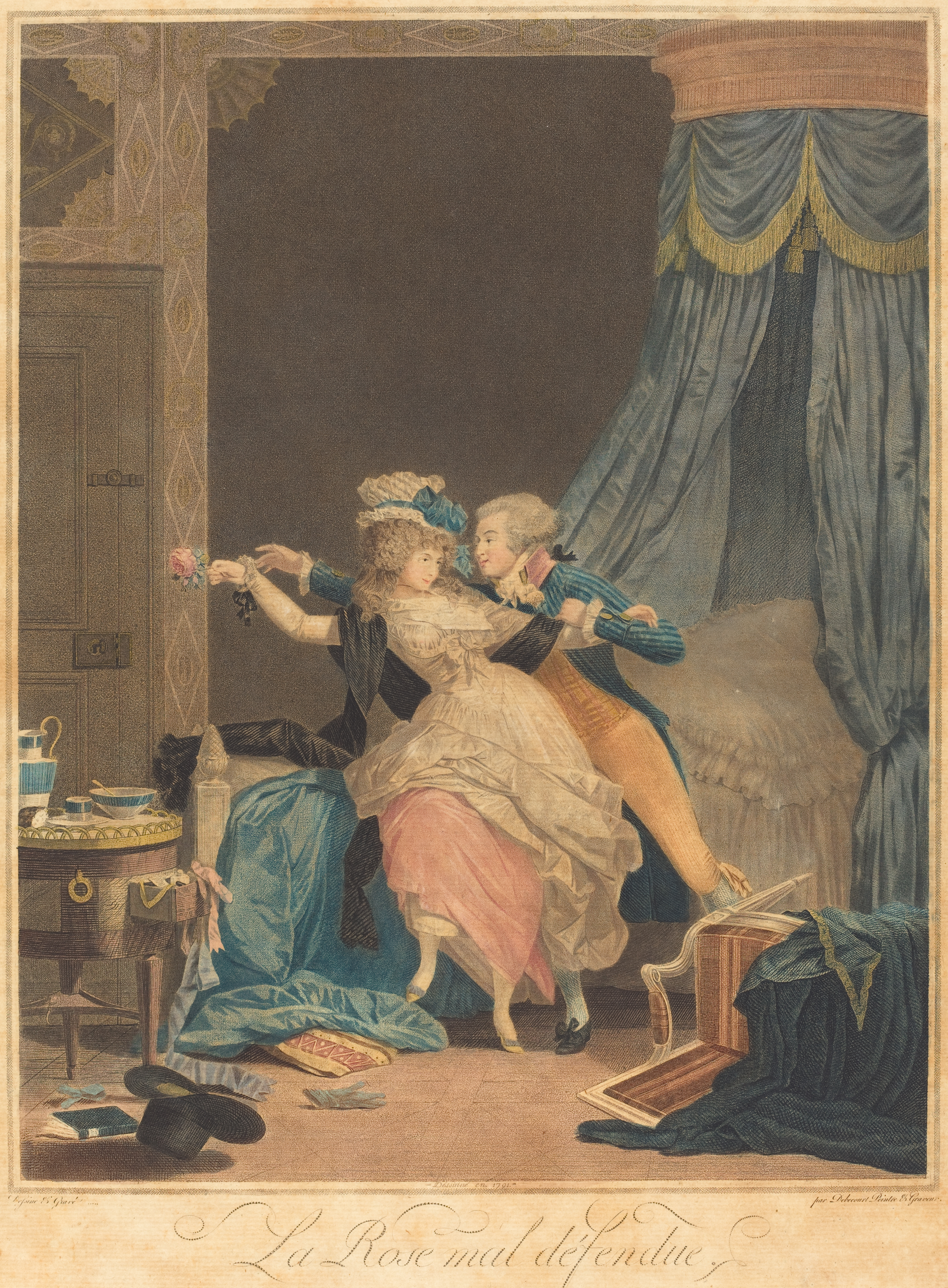
The Poorly Defended Rose, intaglio (1791)

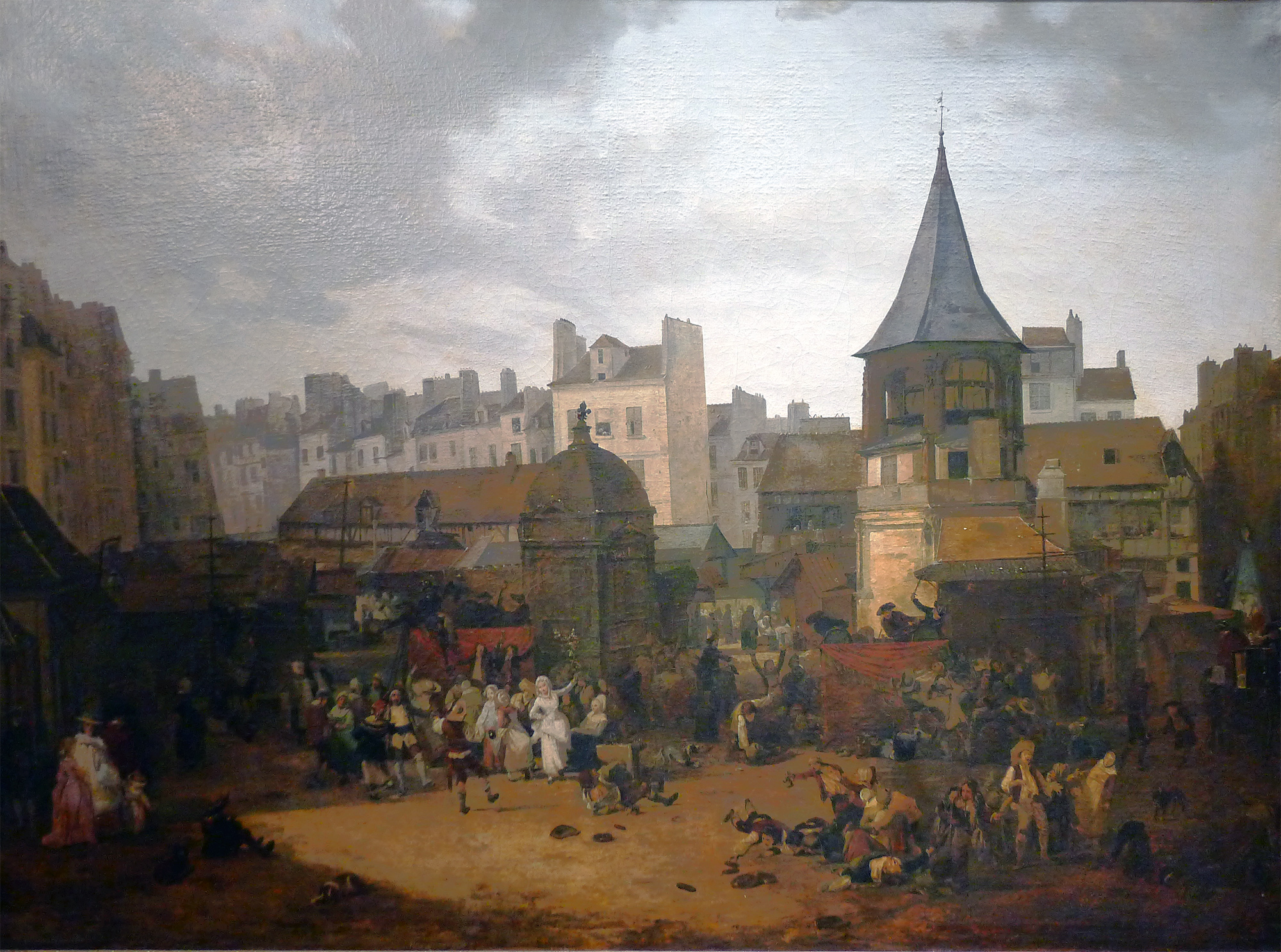
Celebrations given by the City of Paris at Les Halles, on the occasion of the birth of the dauphin

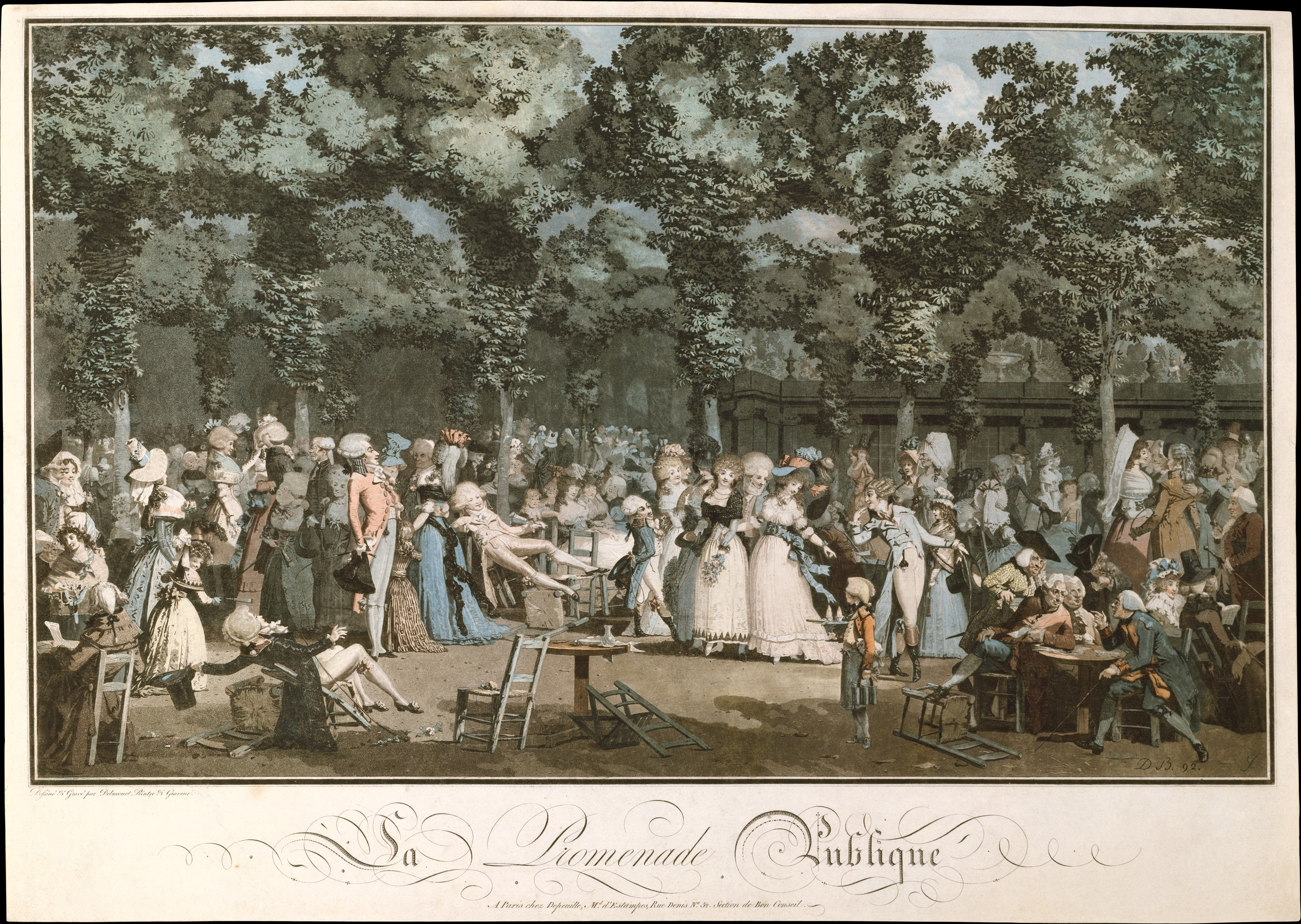
The Public Promenade, etching, engraving, and aquatint (1792)

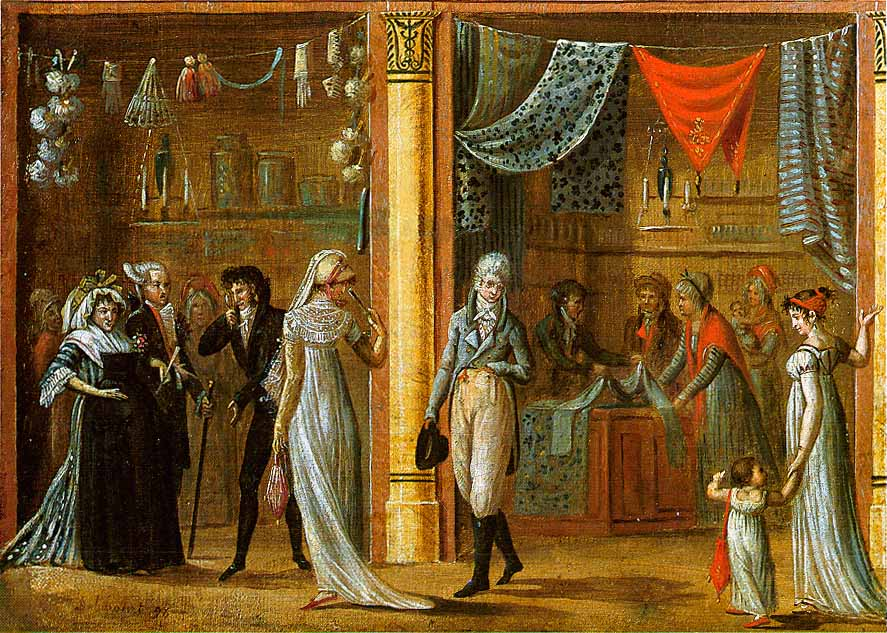
Promenade of the gallery of the Royal Palace, aquatint (1798)

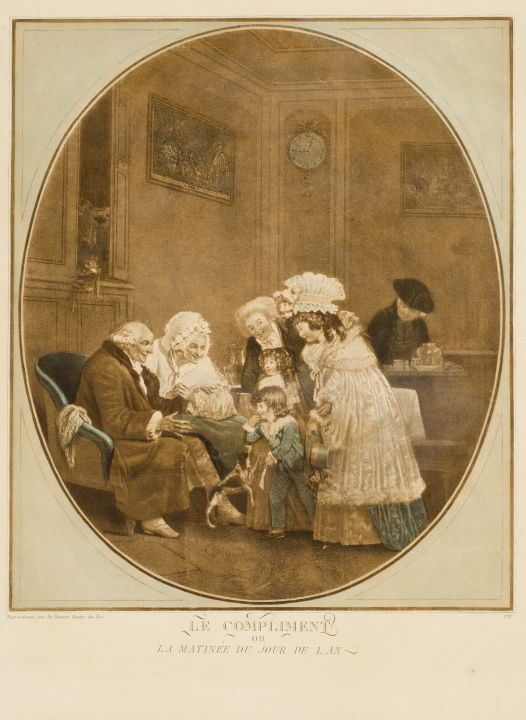
The Compliment, or the morning of New Year's Day, aquatint (1787)
