= Jean-Joseph Foucou =

French sculptor (1739–1821)

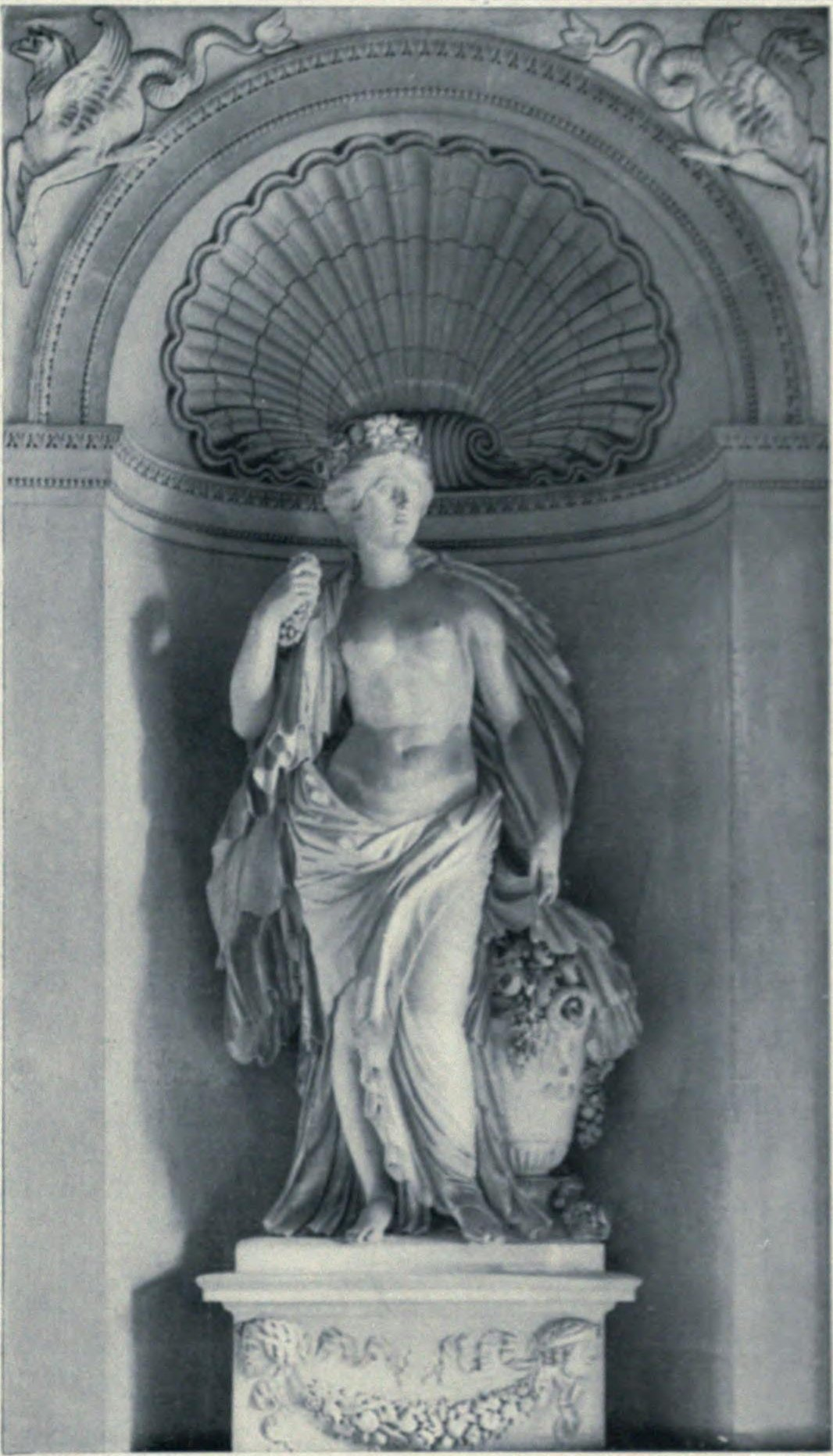
Foucou's Flora within the Château de Maisons

Jean-Joseph Foucou (1739 – 16 February 1821) was a French sculptor.

Foucou was born at Riez, Alpes-de-Haute-Provence. A student at the École de peinture et de sculpture of Marseille, he went to Paris, where he entered the workshop of Jean-Jacques Caffieri. In 1769 he won the Prix de Rome in sculpture, and entered the École royale des élèves protégés in preparation for his residence in Rome, 1771-75. On his return to Paris he was accepted (agrée) in 1777 at the Académie royale de peinture et de sculpture, where he was made a full member in 1785, with a marble of a River for his morceau de reception. He was a regular contributor to the Paris Salons from 1779 to 1812.

Foucou was one of the main artists whose work was included in the collection of the Comédie-Française at the end of the 18th century. Others were Jean-Baptiste d'Huez, Simon-Louis Boizot, Augustin Pajou and Pierre-François Berruer. He collaborated with Pierre Julien in the marble sculpture for the dairy for Marie Antoinette at Château de Rambouillet, and worked among other sculptors on grand Parisian projects, such as the Panthéon.

He was one of the numerous sculptors called upon to provide bronze bas-relief panels for the Place Vendôme Column celebrating Napoleon's victory at Austerlitz.

Foucou worked in collaboration with sculptors Joseph Espercieux, Pierre Petitot and Pierre Cartellier. He died in Paris.
