= Louis-Simon Boizot =

French sculptor (1743–1809)

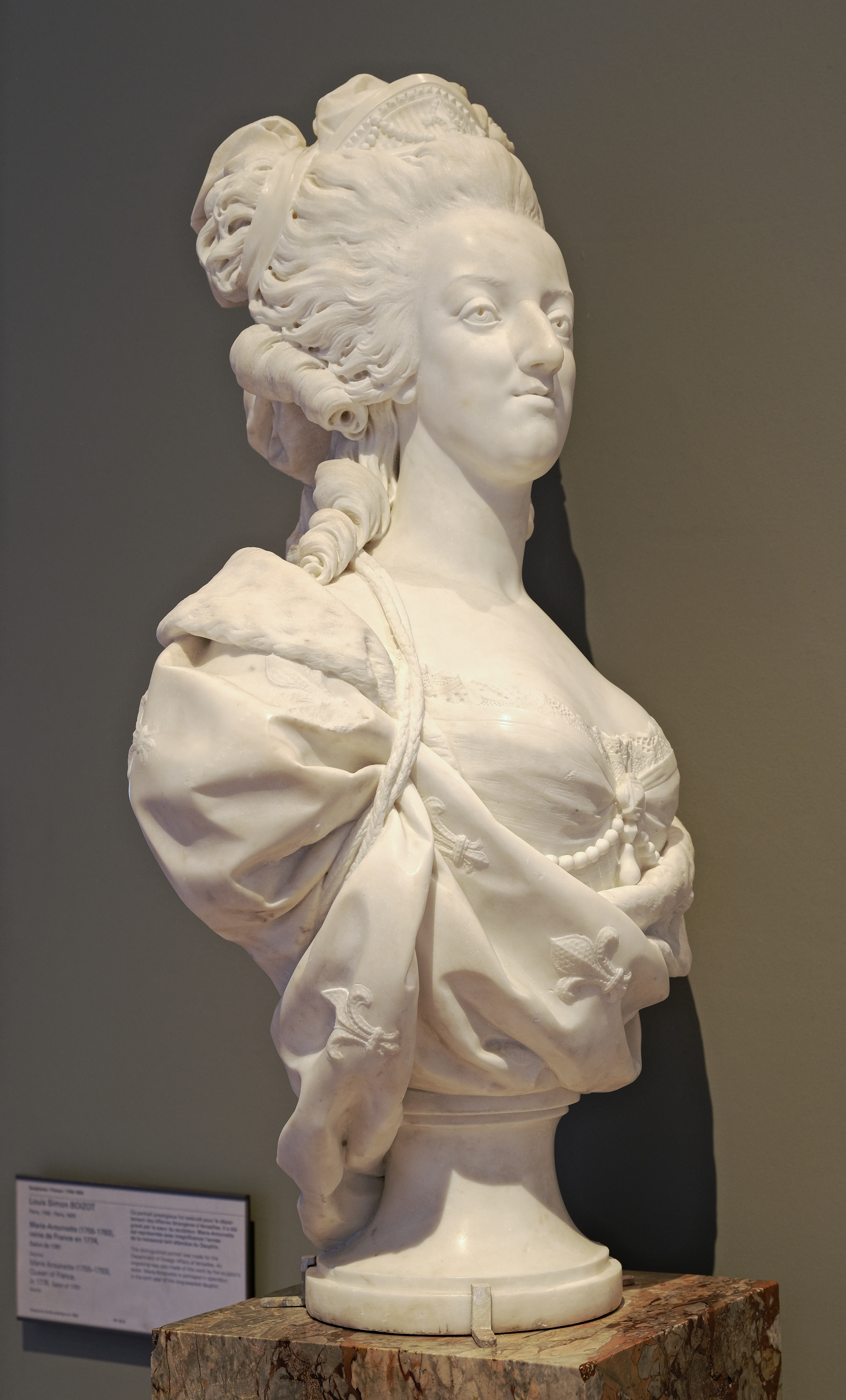
Bust of Marie Antoinette, exhibited at the Salon of 1781 (Louvre)

Louis-Simon Boizot (English: /bwɑːˈzoʊ/ bwah-ZOH, French: [lwi simɔ̃ bwazo]; 1743–1809) was a French sculptor whose models for biscuit figures for Sèvres porcelain are better-known than his large-scale sculptures.

== Biography ==
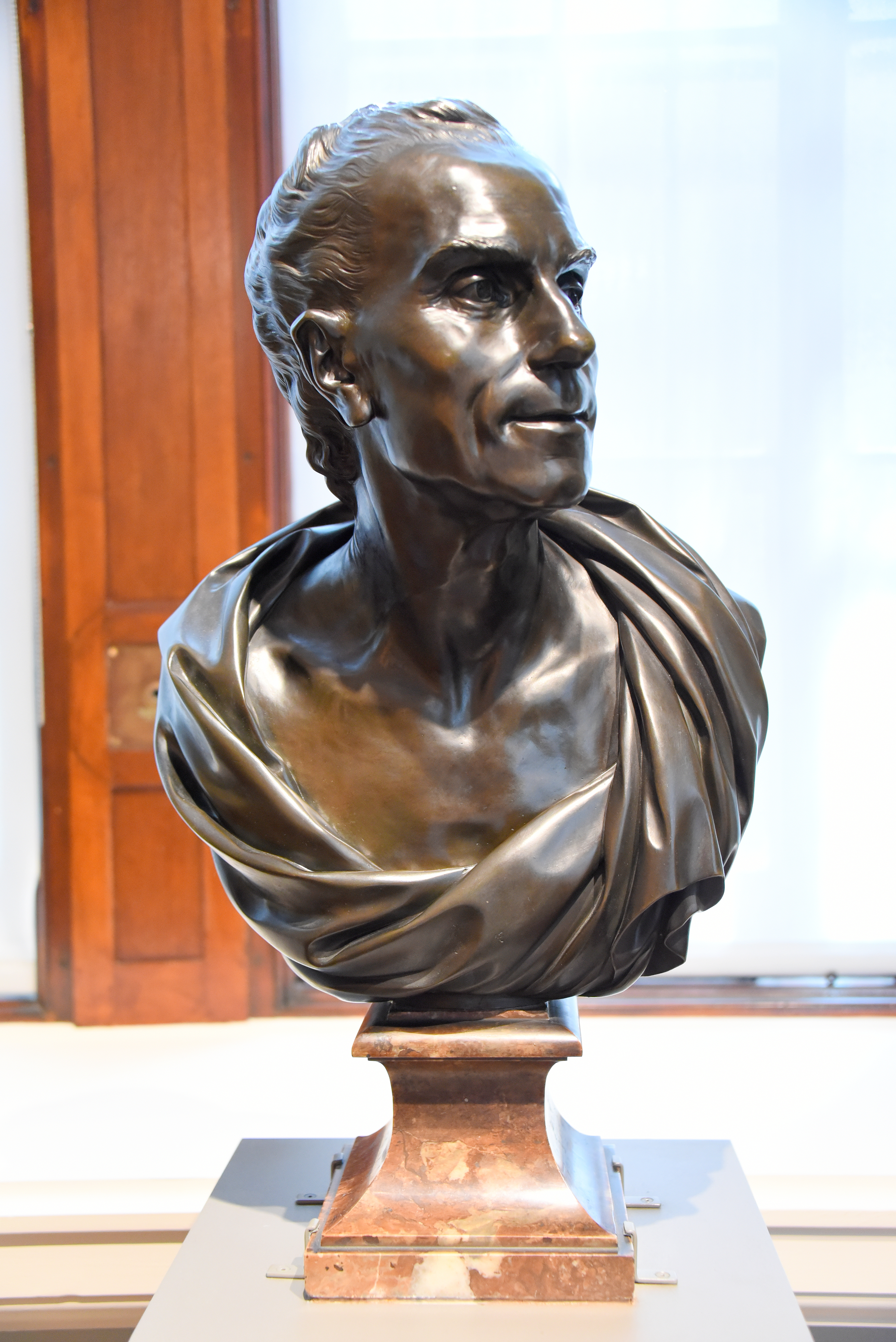
Bust of Claude-Joseph Vernet, 1783 CE. From Paris, France. By Louis-Simon Boizot. The Victoria and Albert Museum, London

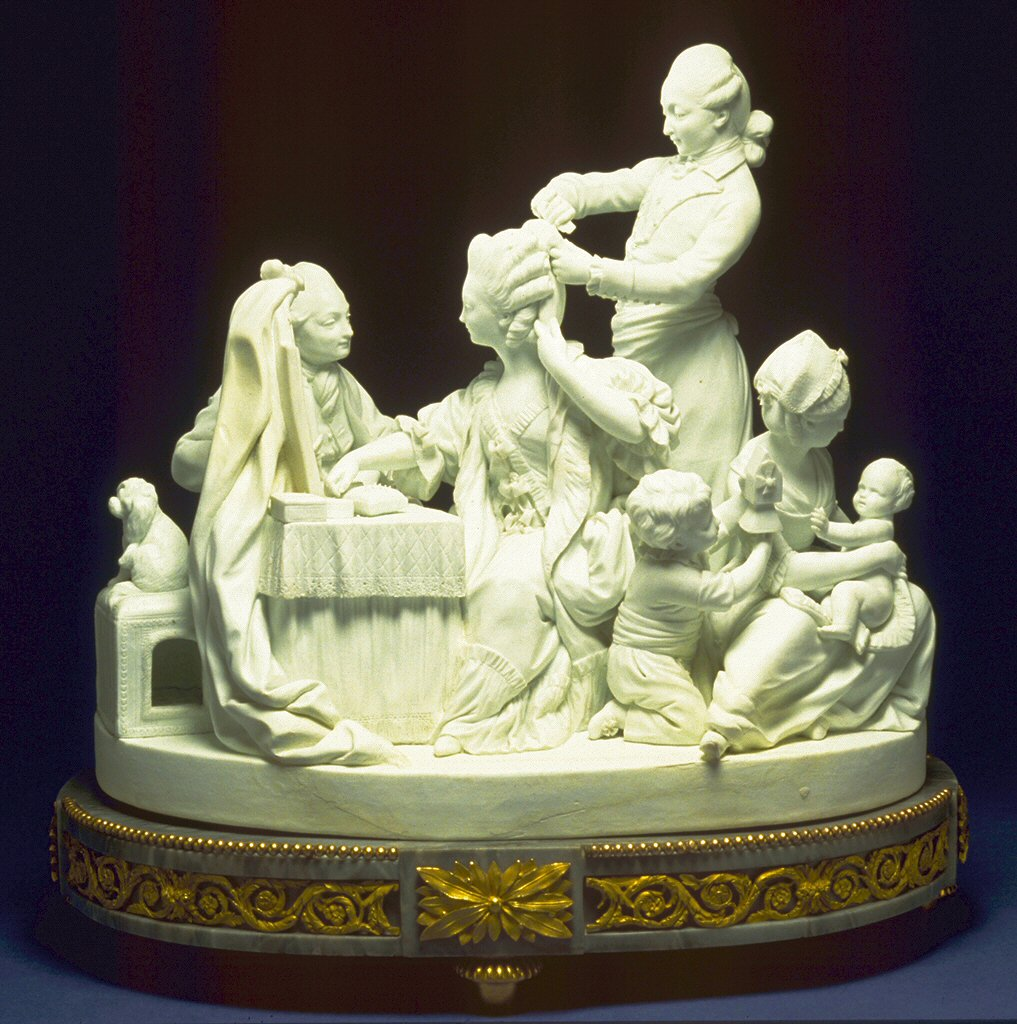
The Toilet of Madame, Sèvres, after a model by Louis-Simon Boizet

Boizot was the son of Antoine Boizot, a designer at the Gobelins manufacture of tapestry. At sixteen, he became a student at the Académie royale de peinture et de sculpture and worked in the atelier of the sculptor René-Michel Slodtz (1705–1764), with whom Houdon also trained. Boizot took the Prix de Rome for sculpture in 1762, for a sojourn at the French Academy in Rome (1765–70).

On his return to Paris he married Marguerite Virginie Guibert, daughter of the sculptor Honoré Guibert. He was admitted to the Académie royale de peinture et de sculpture in 1778 and exhibited at the annual Paris Salon until 1800. His portrait busts of Louis XVI and Joseph II, executed during the Emperor's visit to his sister Marie Antoinette, were executed in 1777 and reproduced in biscuit porcelain at Sèvres. A subtly nuanced decorative panel in very low relief, an allegory of Les Eléments, ca. 1783 is at the Getty Museum.

In 1787, a royal commission from the comte d’Angiviller director of the Bâtiments du Roi, for a series of heroic statues of illustrious French men for Versailles, resulted in Boizot's bust of Racine. Boizot was one of the main artists whose work was included in the collection of the Comédie-Française at the end of the 18th century. Others were Jean-Baptiste d'Huez, Jean-Joseph Foucou, Augustin Pajou and Pierre-François Berruer.

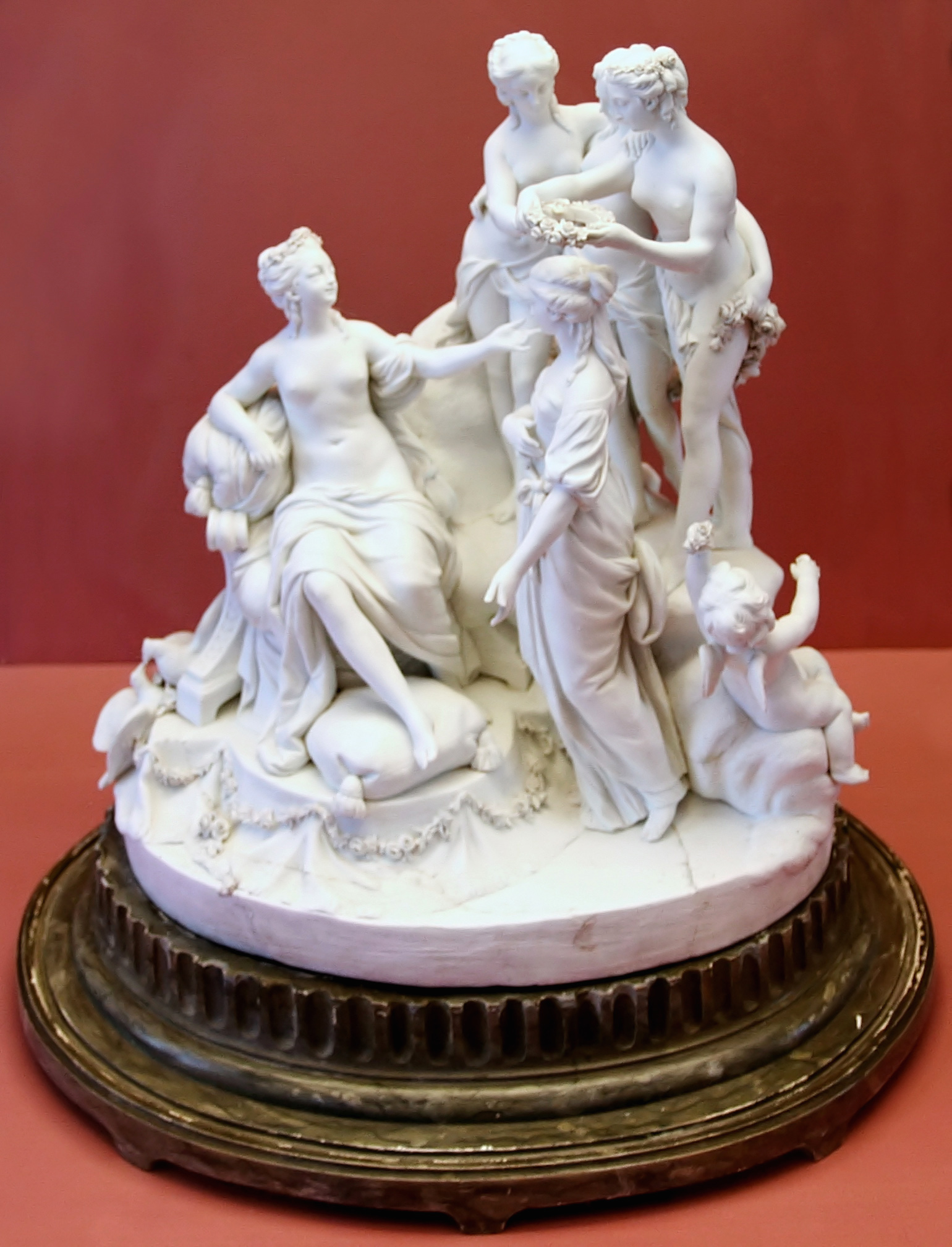
Venus crowning Beauty, Sèvres biscuit, after a model by Boizot

From 1773 to 1800 Boizot directed the sculpture workshop at Manufacture nationale de Sèvres, producing the series of white unglazed biscuit figures with a matte finish imitating marble, in which Neoclassicism was softened by a Rococo sweetness, or by a sentimental moralizing, such as in his hard-paste Sèvres porcelain group of a woman giving aid to a crouching woman with two children, allegorical of Charity, ca 1785, now at the Getty Museum. Such figures were designed for chimneypieces or could be combined in a surtout de table. A vase produced at Sèvres, c 1787, in a classic amphora shape was known as a Vase Boizot Boizot's connection with the piece is unclear: perhaps he provided the models for the gilt-bronze snakes that form handles.

Boizot also produced terracotta models for gilt-bronze clock cases, such as the allegorical figures of the "Avignon" clock in the Wallace Collection, London, cast and chased by Pierre Gouthière, 1777, and, exceptionally, for gilt-bronze furniture mounts on French royal furniture, where the meticulously kept accounts of the Garde-Meuble permit his role as modeller to be identified. Such a case is provided by the pair of draped female caryatid figures, balancing baskets on their heads and holding flowers and grapes in their laps applied to the corners of a drop-front secretary (secrétaire à abattant) that was produced under the direction of the sculptor and entrepreneur Jean Hauré for Louis XVI's Cabinet-Intérieur at Compiègne, 1786-87. Among a host of craftsmen (Guillaume Beneman stamped the carcase) Boizot received 144 livres for his terracotta model, "de stil antique". (Watson 1966, I, no. 107).

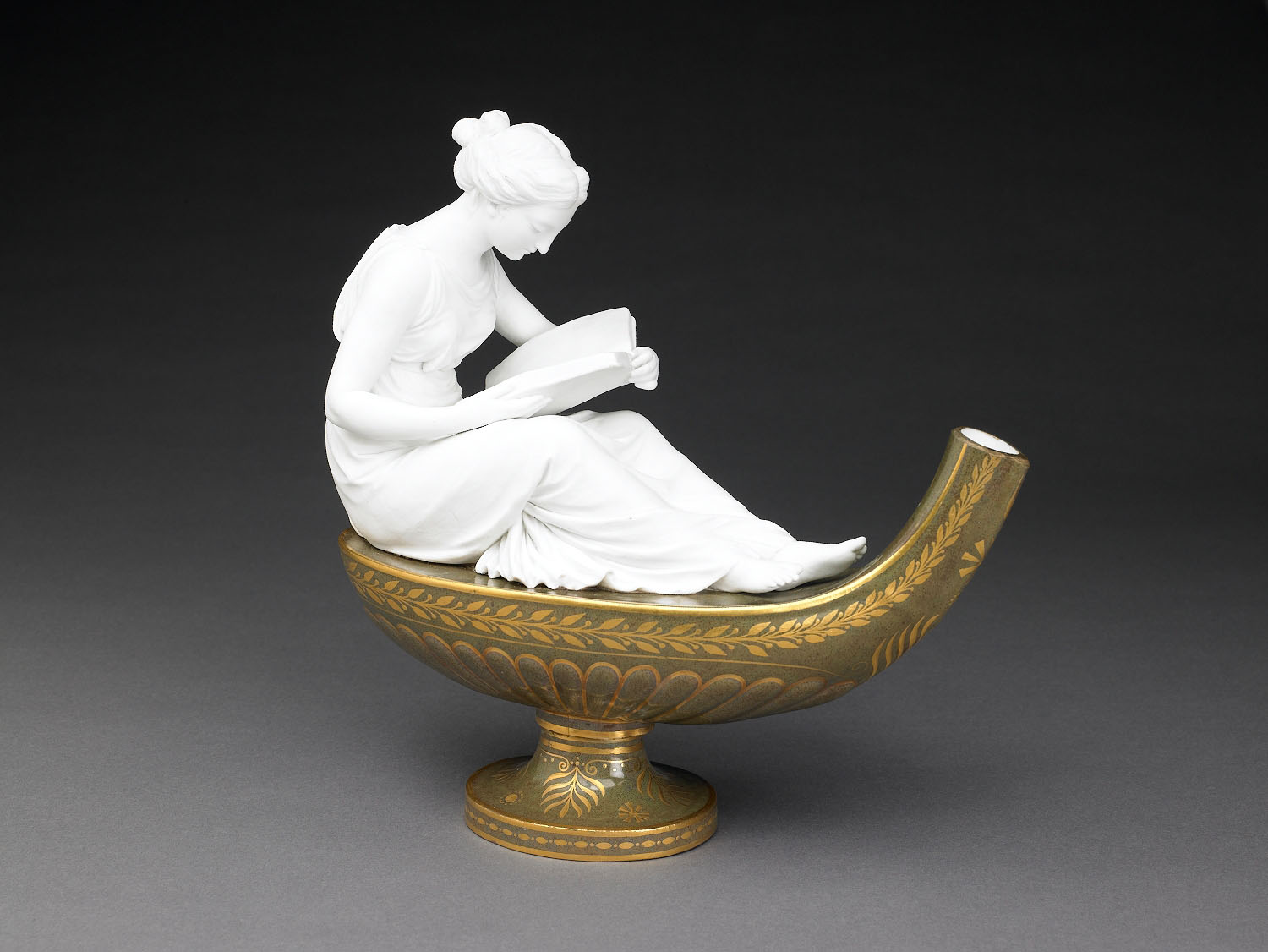
L'Étude

Boizot's models for seated reading and writing female figures, conventionally called L'Étude and La Philosophie (1780), originally destined to be executed in Sèvres biscuit porcelain, were also copied in gilt-bronze by the ciseleur-doreur François Remond and assembled as mantel clocks retailed by the marchand-mercier Dominique Daguerre. Three were purchased for Louis XVI at Saint-Cloud; examples are in numerous public collections.

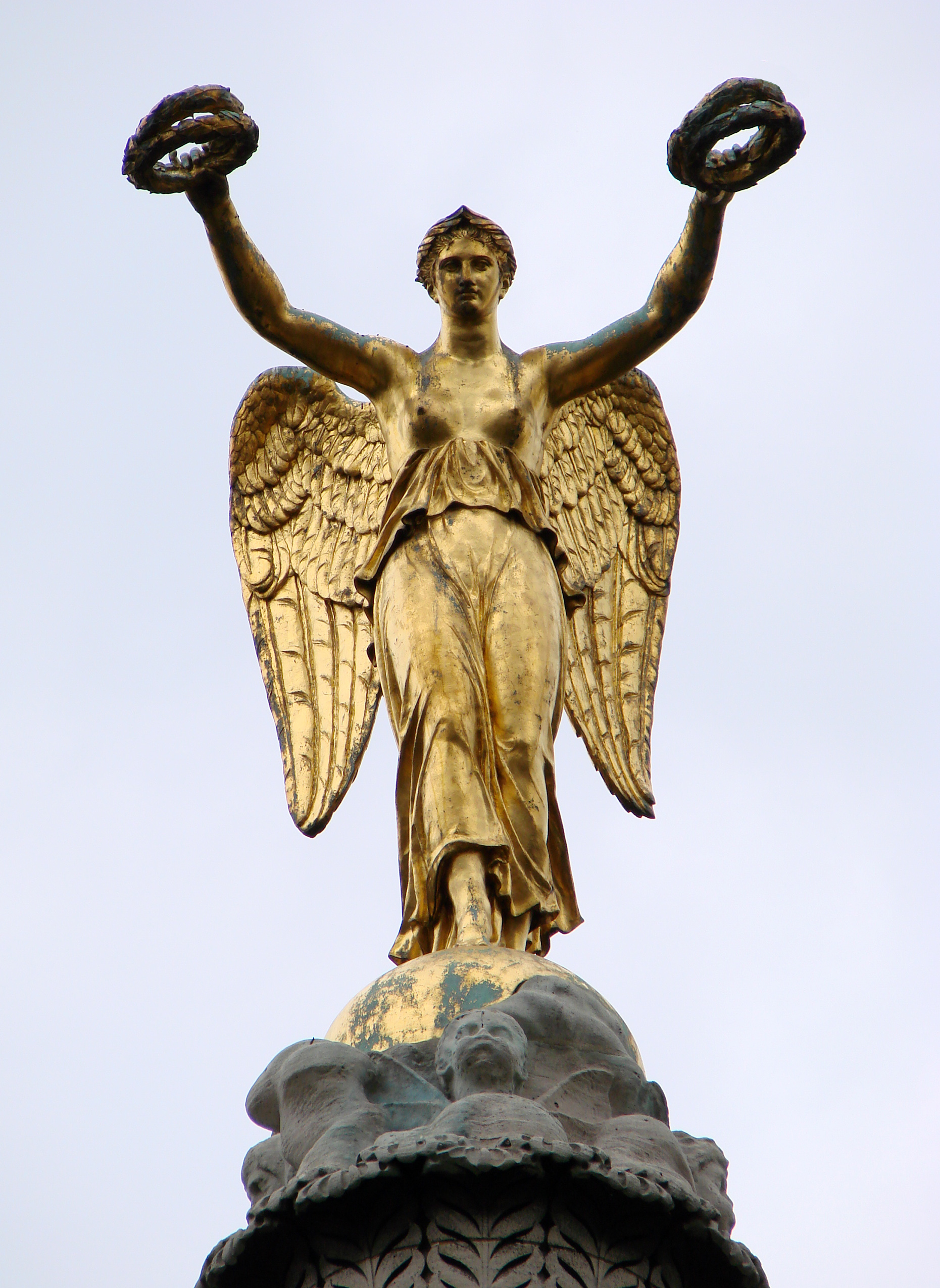
Gilded Victory at the 1808 Fontaine du Palmier

During the Revolution, he was a member of the Commission des Monuments in 1792. From 1805 he held a chair at the Academie des Beaux-Arts. He executed the sculpture for the Fontaine du Palmier erected in 1808 in the Place du Châtelet, Paris, in a more severe and bombastic Empire style. It celebrates Napoleon's return from Egypt. with a gilded Victory (finished in 1806) that surmounts a column with sphinxes spouting water at the base. The original of the Victory is in the gardens of the Musée Carnavalet.
