= Jean-Joseph Espercieux =

French sculptor

Jean-Joseph Espercieux (22 July 1757 in Marseille – 6 July 1840 in Paris) was a French sculptor.

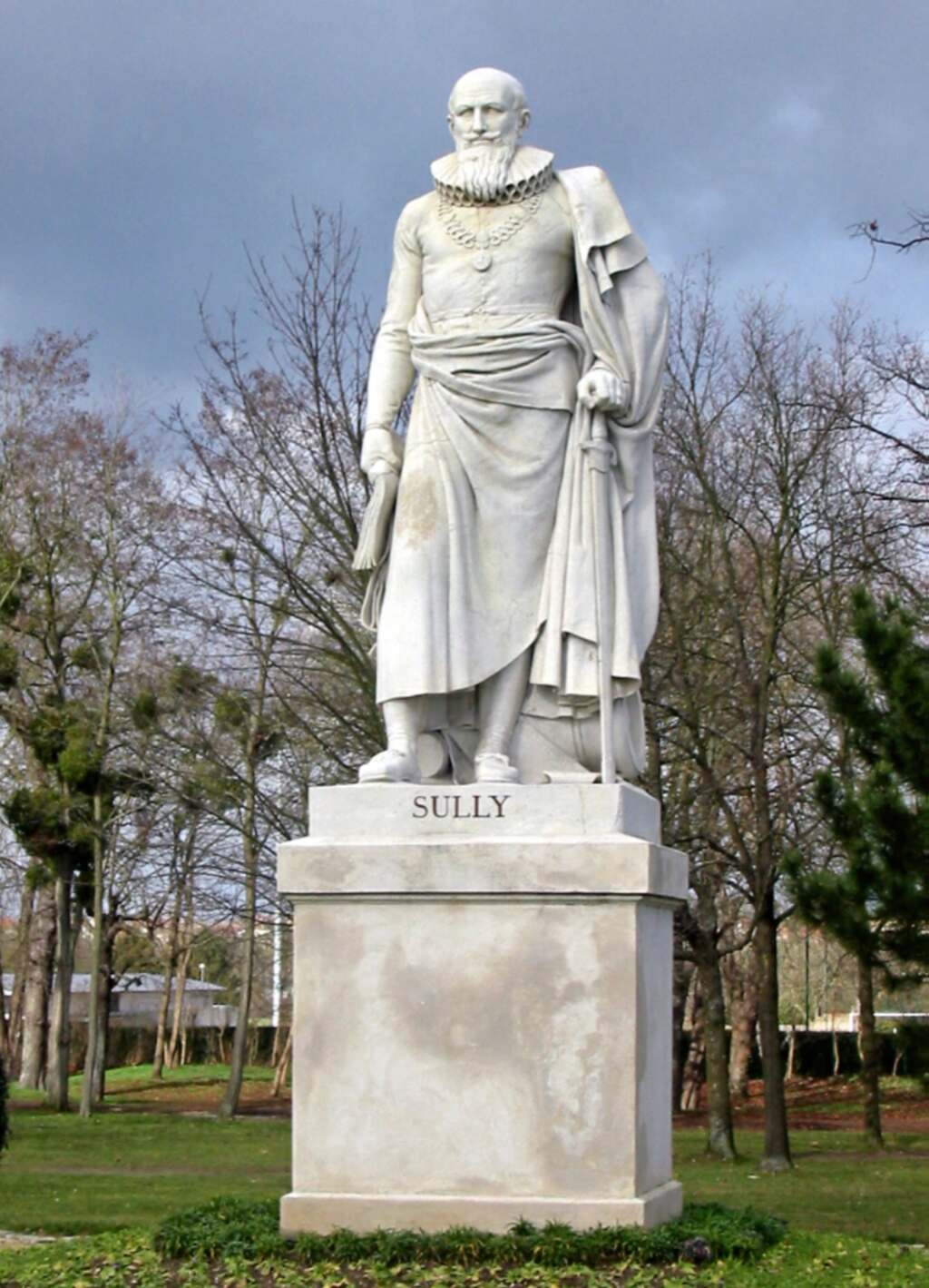
Statue of Maximilien de Béthune, Duke of Sully

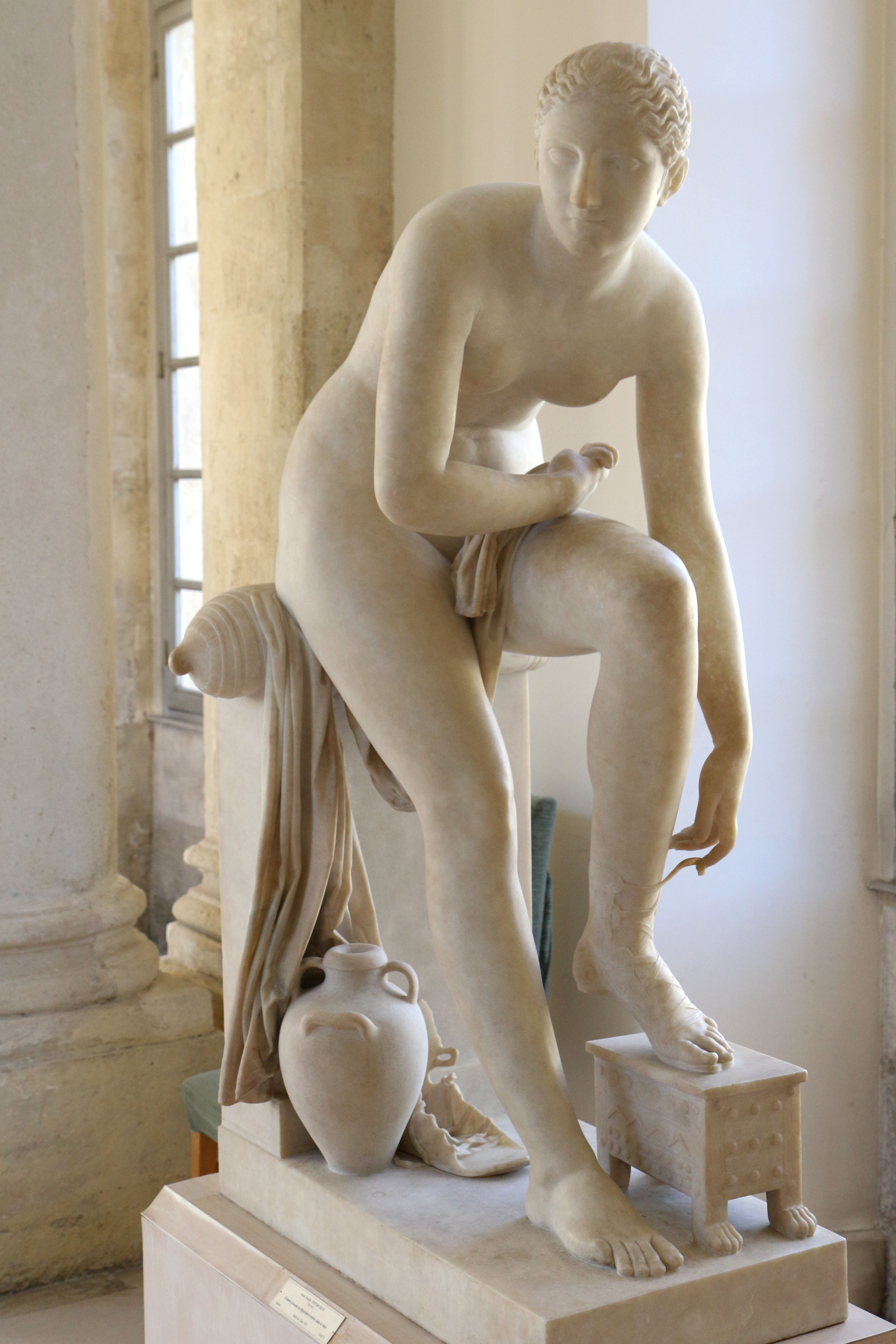
Greek woman preparing to enter the bath

== Life ==
A carpenter's son, he moved to Paris in 1776 to study in the studio of Charles-Antoine Bridan and (on an irregular basis) those of Jean-Joseph Foucou, Pierre Julien and Philippe-Laurent Roland. His main influence seems to have been Jacques-Louis David, though his career prior to the French Revolution is little known. During the Revolution he was heavily pro-Republican and played an active role as one of the presidents of the Societe Republicaine des Arts, making speeches favouring the use of antique costume and patriotic subjects. He exhibited regularly at the Paris Salon, mainly portrait busts, from 1793.

His career's peak came with state commissions during the French Consulate and First French Empire, such as a plaster bust of Cicero (1803, Fontainebleau, Chateau), a plaster statue of Mirabeau (1804-5; present location unknown) for the Luxembourg Palace, a marble relief of The Victory of Austerlitz for the Arc de Triomphe du Carrousel (1810, still in situ) and marble allegorical reliefs for the Fontaine de la Paix in the Marche Saint-Germain in Paris (1810; now Rue Bonaparte).
