= Augustin Pajou =

French sculptor (1730–1809)

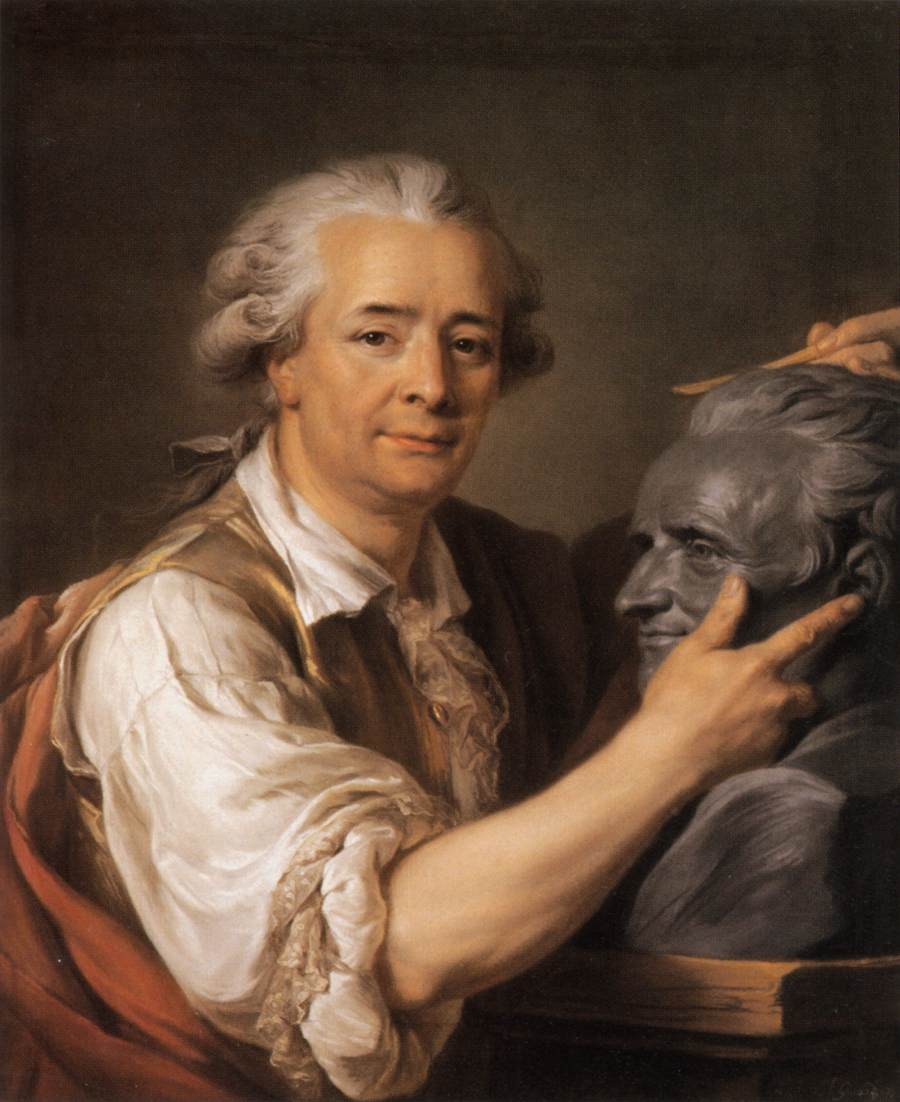
Portrait of Pajou by Adélaïde Labille-Guiard, 1783.

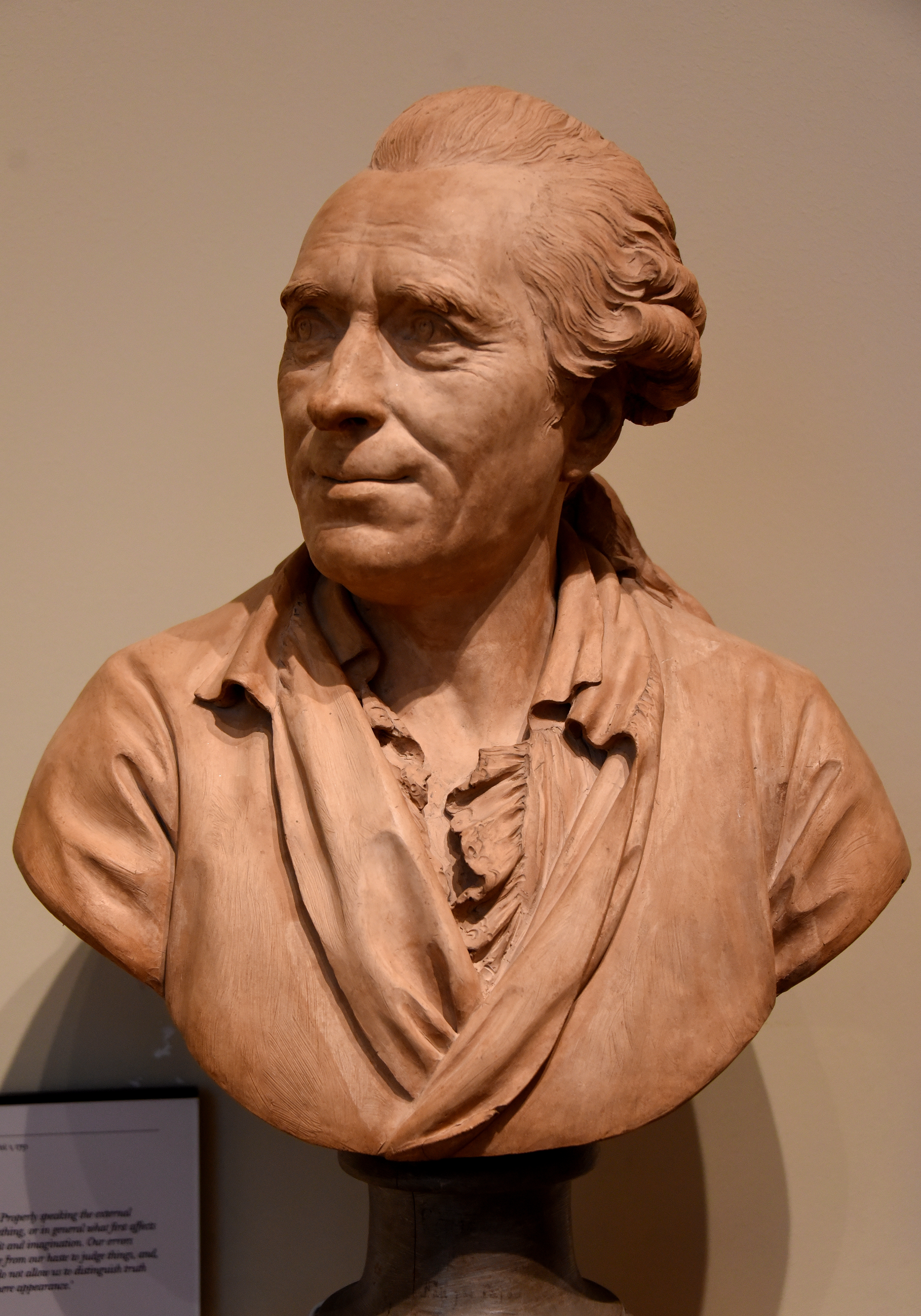
Bust of Michel-Jean Sedaine, 1775, The Victoria and Albert Museum, London.

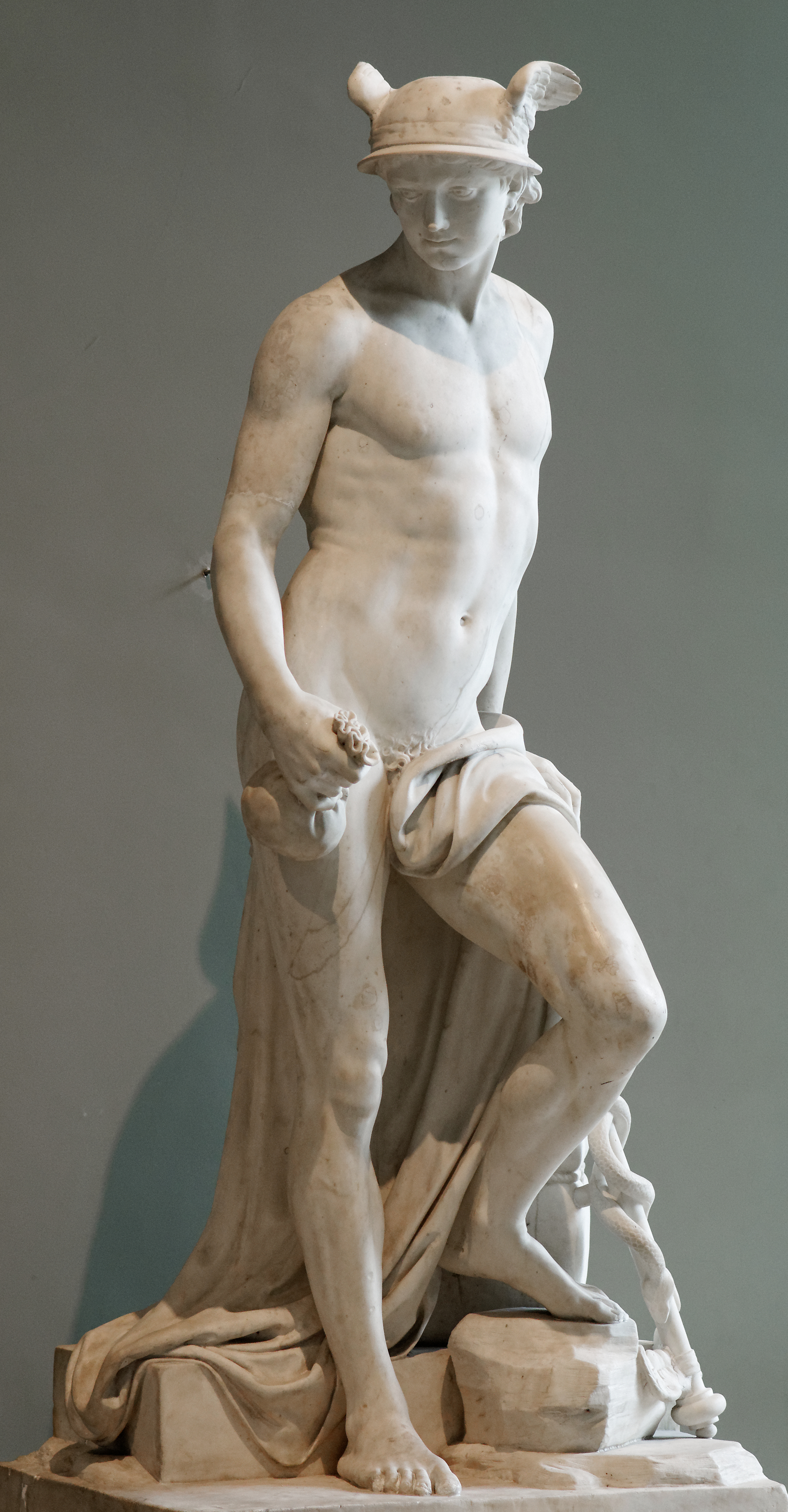
Mercury, 1780.

Augustin Pajou (French pronunciation: [oɡystɛ̃ paʒu]; 19 September 1730 – 8 May 1809) was a French sculptor, born in Paris. At eighteen he won the Prix de Rome, and at thirty exhibited his Pluton tenant Cerbère enchaîné (now in the Louvre).

== Selected works ==
Pajou's portrait busts of Buffon and of Madame du Barry (1773), and his statuette of Bossuet (all in the Louvre), are amongst his best works.

When Bernard Poyet constructed the "Fontaine des Innocents" from the earlier edifice of Pierre Lescot, Pajou provided a number of new figures for the work. Mention should also be made of his bust of Carlin Bertinazzi (1763) at the Comédie Française, and the monument to Marie Leszczyńska, Queen of France (in the Salon of 1769). Pajou was one of the main artists whose work was included in the collection of the Comédie-Française at the end of the 18th century. Others were Jean-Baptiste d'Huez, Jean-Joseph Foucou, Simon-Louis Boizot and Pierre-François Berruer. Pajou was commissioned by Napoleon to make the copies of the Medici Lions now situated in the garden of the Villa Medici 1803. Pajou died in Paris on 8 May 1809.

The Courtauld Institute of Art (London), the Frick Collection (New York City), Harvard University Art Museums (Cambridge, Massachusetts), the Hermitage Museum (Saint Petersburg, Russia), the Honolulu Museum of Art, the J. Paul Getty Museum (Los Angeles, California), the Louvre, Beli Dvor (Belgrade), the Metropolitan Museum of Art (New York City), the Museum of Fine Arts, Boston, Museum of Fine Arts, Lyon, France, Musée des Augustins (Toulouse, France), Musée des Beaux-arts, Nantes, France, Musée National du Château, Pau, France, the National Gallery of Art (Washington D.C.), the National Gallery of Australia (Canberra) and the Royal Museums of Fine Arts of Belgium are among the public collections holding sculpture by Augustin Pajou.

== Children ==
- Jacques-Augustin-Catherine Pajou (1766–1828), painter
- Catherine Flore Pajou, known as "Tante Cocotte" by her brother. She married the sculptor Claude Michel, but he was far older than she was and marriage proved unhappy, ending in divorce. From Montpellier, in his friend Riban's house, where he had gone in year III, Augustin wrote to his son: "This good captive embraces you, unlike the sister whose negligence is not worth this mark of your friendship. I say nothing of the advantages of this article, for a sheaf of paper would not suffice to describe all the complaints we have made against her, and if she has a conscience, she must sense that we have great reason." In 1795 she remarried to Pierre-Louis Martin, known as Saint-Martin who, after several careers, died in Liège as conseiller to the Cour d'Appel. An amateur artist and collector, Saint-Martine produced several paintings of the city of Liège and had his portrait painted by Philippe-Auguste Hennequin. Flore divorced her second husband in year 10 and died on 9 December 1841 at 30 rue de l'Odéon in Paris.
