= Prix de Rome =

French scholarship for arts students

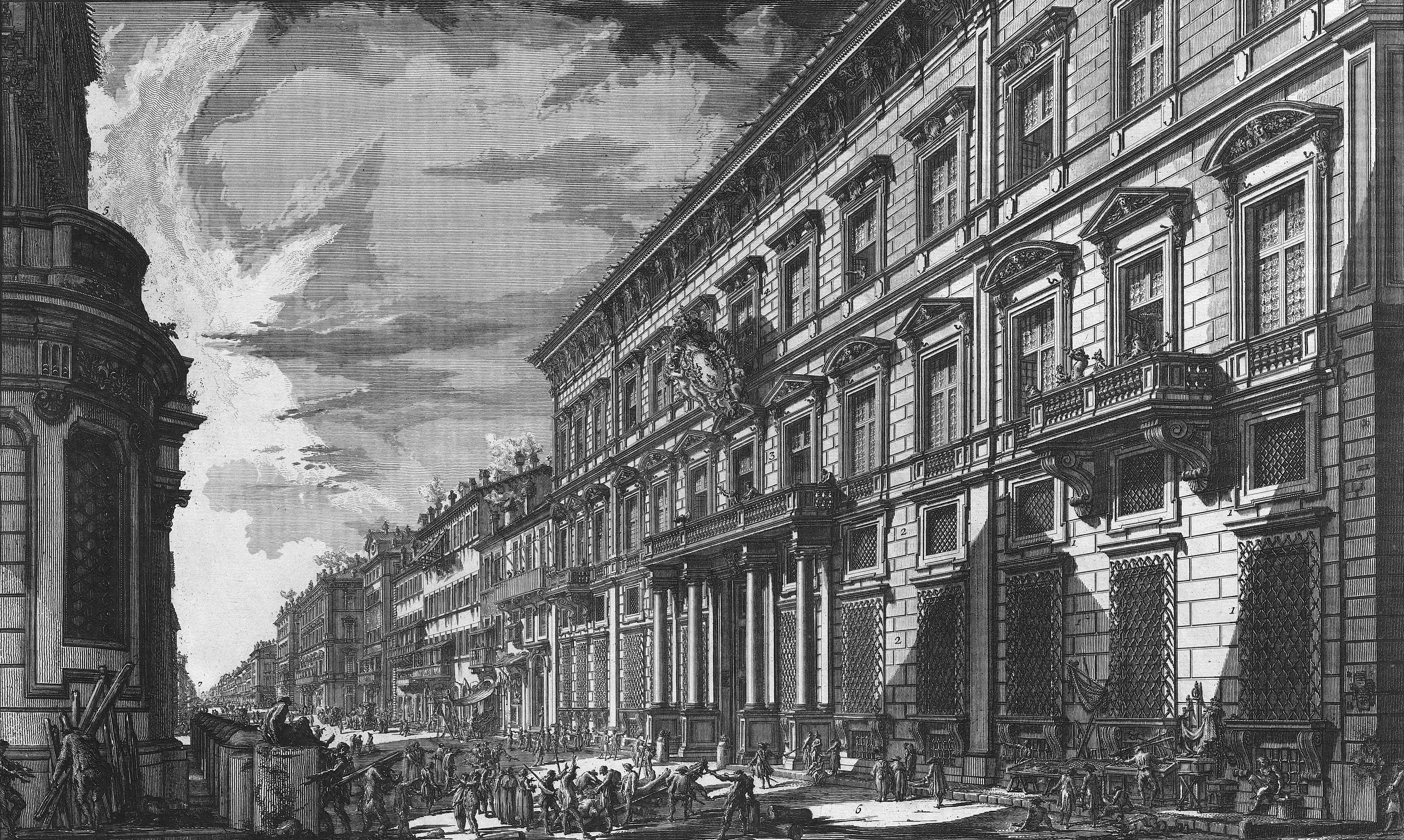
Palazzo Mancini, Rome, the seat of the Académie since 1725. Etching by Giovanni Battista Piranesi, 1752.

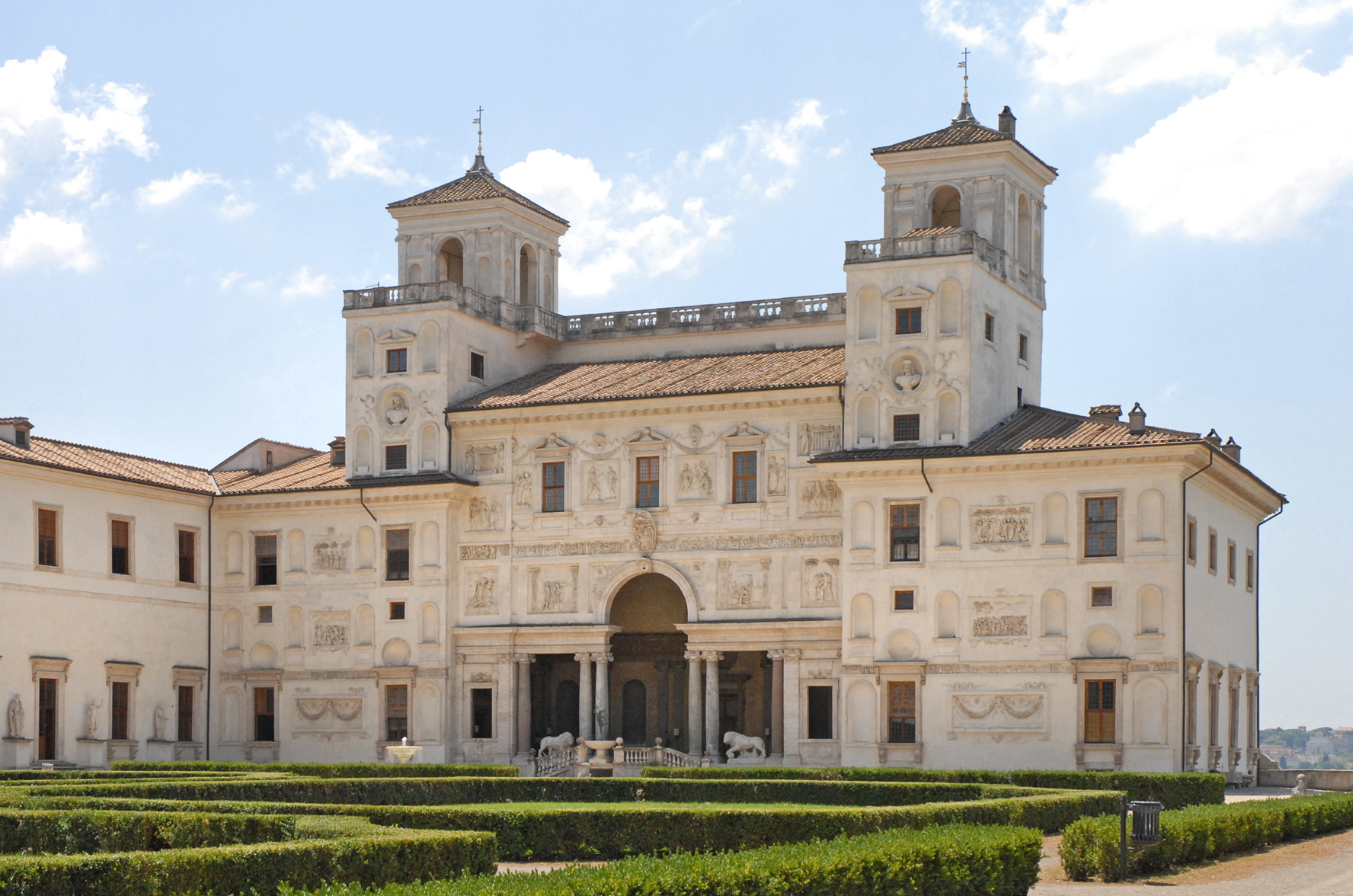
The Villa Medici as it looks today.

The Prix de Rome (pronounced [pʁi də ʁɔm]) or Grand Prix de Rome was a French scholarship for arts students, initially for painters and sculptors, established in 1663 during the reign of Louis XIV of France. Winners were awarded a bursary that allowed them to stay in Rome for three to five years at the expense of the state. The prize was extended to architecture in 1720, music in 1803 and engraving in 1804. The prestigious award was abolished in 1968 by André Malraux, then Minister of Culture, following the May 68 riots that called for cultural change.

== History ==
The Prix de Rome was initially created for painters and sculptors in 1663 in France, during the reign of Louis XIV. It was an annual bursary for promising artists having proved their talents by completing a very difficult elimination contest. To succeed, a student had to create a sketch on an assigned topic while isolated in a closed booth with no reference material to draw on. The prize, organised by the Académie Royale de Peinture et de Sculpture (Royal Academy of Painting and Sculpture), was open to their students. From 1666, the award winner could win a stay of three to five years at the Palazzo Mancini in Rome at the expense of the King of France. In 1720, the Académie Royale d'Architecture began a prize in architecture. Six painters, four sculptors, and two architects would be sent to the French Academy in Rome founded by Jean-Baptiste Colbert from 1666.

Expanded after 140 years into five categories, the contest started in 1663 as two categories: painting and sculpture. Architecture was added in 1720. In 1803, music was added, and after 1804 there was a prix for engraving as well. The primary winner took the "First Grand Prize" (called the agréé), and the "Second Prizes" were awarded to the runners-up.

In 1803, Napoleon Bonaparte moved the French Academy in Rome to the Villa Medici, with the intention of preserving an institution once threatened by the French Revolution. At first, the villa and its gardens were in a sad state, and they had to be renovated in order to house the winners of the Prix de Rome. In this way, he hoped to retain for young French artists the opportunity to see and copy the masterpieces of antiquity and the Renaissance.

Jacques-Louis David, having failed to win the prize three years in a row, considered suicide. Édouard Manet, Edgar Degas, Ernest Chausson, and Maurice Ravel attempted the Prix de Rome but did not gain recognition. Ravel tried a total of five times to win the prize, and the last failed attempt in 1905 was so controversial that it led to a complete reorganization of the administration at the Paris Conservatory.

During World War II (1939–45), the prize winners were accommodated in the Villa Paradiso in Nice. The Prix de Rome was abolished in 1968 by André Malraux, who was Minister of Culture at the time. Since then, a number of contests have been created, and the academies, together with the Institut de France, were merged by the State and the Minister of Culture. Selected residents now have an opportunity for study during an 18-month (sometimes 2-year) stay at The Academy of France in Rome, which is accommodated in the Villa Medici.

The heyday of the Prix de Rome was during the late eighteenth and early nineteenth centuries. It was later imitated by the Prix Abd-el-Tif and the Villa Abd-el-Tif in Algiers, 1907–1961, and later Prix d'Indochine including a bursary to visit the École des Beaux-Arts de l'Indochine in Hanoi, 1920–1939, and bursary for residence at the Casa de Velázquez in Madrid, 1929–present.

== Winners in the Architecture category ==
The Prix de Rome for Architecture was created in 1720.

=== 18th century (architecture) ===
Year	Premier Prix	Deuxième Prix	Troisieme Prix	Competition project
1720	Antoine Deriset			An entry to a Doric palace
1721	Philippe Buache	Guillot-Aubry	Jean Pinard	A plan of a church measuring 20 toises [40 metres] square
1722	Jean-Michel Chevotet	Jolivet		A triumphal arch
1723	Jean Pinard	Pierre Mouret		A mansion for a great nobleman
1724	Jean-Pierre Le Tailleur de Boncourt	Pierre-Étienne Le Bon		A high altar for a cathedral
1725	Pierre-Étienne Le Bon (Note: Though sent to Rome in 1741.)	Clairet		A convent church
1726	François Carlier	Aufrane	Clairet	A portal of a church
1727	François Gallot	Joseph Eustache de Bourge	Pierre Mouret	A mansion for a great nobleman
1728	Antoine-Victor Desmarais	Joseph Eustache de Bourge	Quéau	A chateau for a great nobleman
1729	Joseph Eustache de Bourge	Devillard	Quéau	A cathedral
1730	Claude-Louis d'Aviler	Pierre Laurent	de Devilliard	A triumphal arch
1731	Jean-Baptiste Marteau	Pierre Rousset	Courtillié	A building 25 toises [50 metres] across
1732	Jean-Laurent Le Geay	de Mercy	Pierre Rousset	A portal of a church
1733	Jacques Haneuse	Bailleul	Jean-Baptiste Courtonne	A public square
1734	Vattebled	Pierre Laurent	Lafond	A high altar of a church
1735	Pierre Laurent	Jean-Louis Pollevert	Lindet	A gallery with a chapel
1736	Jean-Louis Pollevert	Maximilien Brébion	Gabriel Pierre Martin Dumont	A country house
1737	Gabriel Pierre Martin Dumont	Lindet	Datif	Two staircases and a vestibule of a palace
1738	Nicolas Marie Potain	Lancret	Jean-Baptiste Courtonne	A gallery with a chapel
1739	Nicolas Dorbay	Maximilien Brébion	Lecamus	A great stable for a royal chateau
1740	Maximilien Brébion	Cordier	de Dreux	A garden 400 toises [800 metres] long
1741	Nicolas-Henri Jardin	Armand	Bourdet	A choir of a cathedral
1742	Armand	Lecamus	Bourdet	A façade of a city hall
1743	Jean Moreau	Cordier	Brébion	A garden 400 toises [800 metres] long
1744	No prize awarded, due to the low quality of entries			
1745	Ennemond Alexandre Petitot	Hazon (recorded as "Hazin")	Deveau and Lelu	A lighthouse
1746	Charles-Louis Clérisseau and Brébion J., ex-aequo	Lelu and Nicolas de Pigage	Turgis	A mansion for a great nobleman
1747	Jérôme Charles Bellicard	Giroux	Lieutaut	A triumphal arch
1748	Parvis	Lelu	Duvivier	An exchange
1749	François Dominique Barreau de Chefdeville	Julien-David Le Roy	Pierre-Louis Moreau-Desproux	A temple to peace
1750	Julien-David Le Roy	Pierre-Louis Moreau-Desproux	Charles De Wailly	An orange garden
1751	Marie-Joseph Peyre	Pierre-Louis Moreau-Desproux	Pierre-Louis Helin	A public fountain
1752	Charles De Wailly	Pierre-Louis Helin	Moreau	A façade of a palace
1753	Louis-François Trouard	Jardin		A gallery 50 toises [100 metres] long
1754	Pierre-Louis Helin	Billaudet	Jardin	An art salon
1755	Victor Louis et Charles Maréchaux, ex-aequo	Boucart	Rousseau	A funereal chapel
1756	Henri-Antoine Lemaire	Houdon		An isolated chapel
1757	Competition canceled (Note: "After the students present for the architecture competition left, only eight returned to make an esquisse, but none were admitted to continue")			A concert hall
1758	Mathurin Cherpitel (Note: Carried over from 1757.) and Jean-François-Thérèse Chalgrin, ex-aequo	Jacques Gondouin and Claude Jean-Baptiste Jallier de Savault (Note: Noted as Jollivet.)	Houdon and Gérendo	A pavilion at the corner of a terrace
1759	Antoine Le Roy	Joseph Elie Michel Lefebvre	Cauchois and Jacques Gondouin	A horse-riding school
1760	Joseph Elie Michel Lefebvre	Claude Jean-Baptiste Jallier de Savault	Gabriel	A parish church
1761	Antoine-Joseph de Bourge	Boucher	Antoine-François Peyre	A concert hall
1762	Antoine-François Peyre	Pierre d'Orléans	Adrien Mouton	A covered market
1763	Charles François Darnaudin	Boucher	Louis-François Petit-Radel	A triumphal arch
1764	Adrien Mouton	Pierre d'Orléans	Naudin	A school
1765	Jean-François Heurtier	Boucu	Paris	A dome of a cathedral
1766	Jean-Arnaud Raymond	Pierre d'Orléans	Paris	A portal of a cathedral
1767	Pierre d'Orléans (Note: From 1767 through 1772, the winners of the Prix de Rome were deprived of the usual scholarship that funded their trips to Rome; this occurred because of the vengeance exacted by Abel-François Poisson de Vandières in an enormous abuse of his power. Having quarreled with the Académie d'Architecture, Poisson de Vendières sent his personal manservants instead to Rome instead of the winners of the Grand Prix.)	Le Moyne	Marquis	A customs house
1768	Jean-Philippe Lemoine de Couzon	Bernard Poyet	Paris	A theater
1769	Jacob Guerne	Lussault	Paris	A public festival for a prince
1770	Jean-Jacques Huvé	Renard	Panseron	An arsenal
1771	Not awarded			A city hospital
1772	Claude-Thomas de Lussault and Jean-Auguste Marquis (Note: Carried over from 1771.)	Renard	Nicolas-Claude Girardin	A palace for the parent of a sovereign
1773	Jean Augustin Renard (Note: In 1773 the funding for the scholarship to Rome was reestablished for architects through the generosity of the Abbé Terray, successor of the Marquis de Marigny.)	Mathurin Crucy and Coutouly	Thierry and Herbelot	A pavilion for a sovereign
1774	Mathurin Crucy	Bonnet	Charles Joachim Bénard,	Mineral baths
1775	Paul Guillaume Le Moine le Roman	Louis-Étienne de Seine	Doucet (Note: 1775 was the last year that a third prize (Troisieme Prix) was awarded.)	Schools of medicine
1776	Louis-Jean Desprez	Charles Joachim Bénard	–	A chateau for a great nobleman
1777	Louis-Étienne de Seine	Guy de Gisors	–	A water tower
1778	First and second prizes carried over to 1779		–	Public prisons
1779	Guy de Gisors (Note: Carried over from 1778.) and Père François Jacques Lannoy	Durand and Barbier	–	An art museum
1780	Louis Alexandre Trouard	Durand	–	A school on a triangular plot
1781	Louis Combes	Moitte	–	A cathedral
1782	Pierre Bernard	Cathala	–	A courthouse
1783	Antoine Vaudoyer	Charles Percier	–	A menagerie
1784	Auguste Cheval de Saint-Hubert	Moreau	–	A lazaret
1785	Jean-Charles Alexandre Moreau	Pierre-François-Léonard Fontaine (Note: Fontaine would never win the Prix de Rome; however, a space at the Mancini Palace opened up in 1787 due to the delay in awarding the prize for that year, and Fontaine became the resident pensionnaire, remaining in Rome until 1790.)	–	A funeral chapel
1786	Charles Percier	Louis-Robert Goust	–	A meeting house for all the Académies
1787	First and second prizes carried over to 1788		–	A city hall
1788	Jacques-Charles Bonnard (Note: Carried over from 1787.) and Jean Jacques Tardieu, ex-aequo	Louis-Robert Goust and Romain	–	A public treasury
1789	Jean-Baptiste Louis François Le Febvre	Gaucher	–	A school of medicine
1790	No competition (Note: The projected entrants boycotted the contest by renouncing their status of students until the Académie adopted the changes they demanded in the old regulations.)			
1791	Claude-Mathieu Delagardette	Normand	–	A gallery of a palace
1792	Pierre-Charles-Joseph Normand	Bergognion	–	A public market for a great city
1793	No first prize awarded	Constant Protain	–	A barracks
1794	No competition (Note: From 1794–96 no competitions were held, since the Académies established by the Ancien Régime had been abolished by the Republican government. They were re-established by decree of 28 October 1796 under a new body known as the Institut de France.)			
1795	No competition			
1796	No competition			
1797	Louis Ambroise Dubut and Cousin, ex-aequo	Éloi Labarre and Maximilien Joseph Hurtault	–	Public granaries
1798	Joseph Clémence	Joseph Pompon	–	A maritime exchange
1799	Louis-Sylvestre Gasse and Auguste Henri Victor Grandjean de Montigny, ex-aequo	Jean-Baptiste Guignet	–	A cemetery 500 meters long
1800	Simon Vallot and Jean-François-Julien Mesnager, ex-aequo	Jean-Baptiste Dedeban and Hubert Rohault	–	An institute of sciences and arts or a national school of fine arts

=== 19th century (architecture) ===
Year	Premier Prix	Deuxième Prix	Troisieme Prix/ Honorable Mention	Competition project
1801	Auguste Famin	Dedeban		A forum
1802	Hubert Rohault de Fleury	Bury		A trade fair with exhibition pavilion for industrial products
1803	François-Narcisse Pagot	André Chatillon		A maritime port
1804	Jules Lesueur	André Chatillon		A palace of a sovereign
1805	Auguste Guenepin	Huyot		Six houses for six families
1806	Jean-Baptiste Desdeban	Louis-Hippolyte Lebas		A palace for a legion of honor
1807	Jean-Nicolas Huyot	Leclère	Giroust (Note: Medal of encouragement.)	A palace for the education of princes
1808	Achille-François-René Leclère	François-Auguste Jolly		Public baths for Paris
1809	André Chatillon	Grillon		A cathedral
1810	Martin-Pierre Gauthier	Vauchelet and Jacques Lacornée		An exchange for a coastal city
1811	Jean-Louis Provost	Renié		A palace for a university
1812	Tilman-François Suys	Baron	Poisson (Note: Troisieme Prix restored in 1812.)	A private hospital
1813	Auguste Caristie	Fedel and Landon		A city hall
1814	Charles Henri Landon and Louis Destouches, ex-aequo	Louis Visconti	Vauchelet	A museum and library
1815	Pierre Anne Dedreux	Louis-Julien-Alexandre Vincent		A technical college
1816	Lucien Van Cleemputte	Jean-Baptiste Lesueur		A palace for the Institut [de France]
1817	Antoine Garnaud	Abel Blouet		A musical conservatory
1818	No first prize awarded	Félix-Emmanuel Callet	Desplans (mentioned)	A public promenade
1819	Félix-Emmanuel Callet and Jean-Baptiste Lesueur, ex-aequo	François Villain		A cemetery
1820	François Villain	Auguste-Théophile Quantinet and Émile Jacques Gilbert		A medical school
1821	Guillaume-Abel Blouet	Henri Labrouste		A courthouse
1822	Émile Gilbert	Fontaine and Jules Bouchet	Léon Vaudoyer	An opera house
1823	Félix Duban	Alphonse de Gisors et Jean-Louis Victor Grisart		A customs house
1824	Henri Labrouste	Lépreux et Léon Vaudoyer	Augustin Burdet	A court of cassation
1825	Joseph-Louis Duc	Felix Friès	Dommey	A city hall
1826	Léon Vaudoyer	Marie Antoine Delannoy	Dommey	A palace for the Academy [of architecture] of France in Rome
1827	Théodore Labrouste	François-Alexis Cendrier		A natural history museum
1828	Marie Delannoy	Bourguignon	Abric	A public library
1829	Simon-Claude Constant-Dufeux	Pierre-Joseph Garrez		A lazaret
1830	Pierre-Joseph Garrez	Alphonse-François-Joseph Girard		A house of entertainment for a prince
1831	Prosper Morey	Jean-Arnoud Léveil		A establishment for thermal waters
1832	Jean-Arnoud Léveil	François-Joseph Nolau		A museum
1833	Victor Baltard	Hector-Martin Lefuel	Chargrasse	A military academy
1834	Paul-Eugène Lequeux	Nicolas-Auguste Thumeloup	Alphonse-Augustin Finiels	An Atheneum
1835	Charles Victor Famin	Jean-Baptiste Guenepin and Alexis Paccard		A medical school
1836	François-Louis-Florimond Boulanger and Jean-Jacques Clerget	Antoine Isidore Eugène Godebœuf		A hall for the exhibition of works of art and industrial products
1837	Jean-Baptiste Guenepin	Antoine-Julien Hénard and Jules Duru		A Pantheon
1838	Toussaint Uchard	Auguste-Joseph Magne		A cathedral church
1839	Hector Lefuel	François-Marie Péron		A Town Hall
1840	Théodore Ballu	Philippe-Auguste Titeux		A palace of the House of Lords
1841	Alexis Paccard	Jacques-Martin Tétaz		An overseas French ambassadorial palace
1842	Philippe-Auguste Titeux	Prosper Desbuisson and Louis-Etienne Lebelin	Albert-François-Germain Delaage	A palace of the archives
1843	Jacques-Martin Tétaz	Pierre-Joseph Dupont and Louis-Jules André		A palace of the Institute
1844	Prosper Desbuisson	Charles Jean Lainé and Agis-Léon Ledru	Agis-Léon Ledru and Eugène Démangeat	A palace for the French Academy
1845	Félix Thomas	Pierre Trémaux and Charles-Auguste-Philippe Lainé		A cathedral church
1846	Alfred-Nicolas Normand	Thomas-Augustin Monge and Jacques-Louis-Florimond Ponthieu		A Natural History museum
1847	Louis-Jules André	Charles-Mathieu-Quirin Claudel		A palace for the Chamber of Deputies
1848	Charles Garnier	Achille-Aimé-Alexis Hue	Denis Lebouteux	A Conservatory for Arts and Crafts
1849	Denis Lebouteux	Gabriel-Jean-Antoine Davioud	Paul-René-Léon Ginain	A school of Fine Arts
1850	Victor Louvet	Edouard-Auguste Villain		A large public square
1851	Gabriel-Auguste Ancelet	Michel-Achille Triquet	Joseph-Alfred Chapelain	A hospice in the Alps
1852	Léon Ginain	Louis-François Douillard the elder and Michel Douillard the younger		A Gymnasium
1853	Arthur-Stanislas Diet	Georges-Ernest Coquart	Pierre Jérôme Honoré Daumet	A museum for a capital city
1854	Paul Émile Bonnet and Joseph Auguste Émile Vaudremer jointly	François-Philippe Boitte		A monument dedicated to the burial of the sovereign of a great empire
1855	Honoré Daumet	Edmond-Jean-Baptiste Guillaume and Joseph-Eugène Heim the younger		Conservatory of Music and Declamation
1856	Edmond Guillaume	Constant Moyaux		Palace of the Ambassador at Constantinople
1857	Joseph Heim	Ernest Moreau		A Faculty of Medicine
1858	Georges-Ernest Coquart	Eugène Train		Imperial Hotel for Naval invalids
1859	Charles Thierry and Louis Boitte jointly			A Court of Cassation
1860	Joseph Louis Achille Joyau	Bénard	Julien Guadet	An Imperial Residence at Nice
1861	Constant Moyaux	François-Wilbrod Chabrol		An establishment for thermal waters
1862	François-Wilbrod Chabrol			A palace for the Governor of Algeria
1863	Emmanuel Brune			A main staircase
1864	Julien Guadet and Arthur Dutert jointly			A hospice in the Alps
1865	Louis Noguet and Gustave Gerhardt jointly			A hostel for travellers
1866	Jean-Louis Pascal			A banking house
1867	Émile Bénard			An exhibition of Fine Art
1868	Charles Alfred Leclerc			A calvary
1869	Ferdinand Dutert			A French Embassy
1870	Albert-Félix-Théophile Thomas			A Medical School
1871	Émile Ulmann			A Palace of Representatives
1872	Stanislas Louis Bernier			A Natural History Museum
1873	Marcel Lambert			A water tower
1874	Benoît Édouard Loviot			A Palace of Faculties
1875	Edmond Paulin	Jean Bréasson		A Palace of Justice for Paris
1876	Paul Blondel			A Palace of Arts
1877	Henri-Paul Nénot	Adrien Chancel		An Atheneum for a capital city
1878	Victor Laloux	Louis-Marie-Théodore Dauphin and Victor-Auguste Blavette		A cathedral church
1879	Victor-Auguste Blavette			A Conservatory
1880	Louis Girault	Jacques Hermant		A hospice for sick children on the Mediterranean
1881	Henri Deglane			A Palace of Fine Art
1882	Pierre Esquié			A Palace for the Council of State
1883	Gaston Redon			A necropolis
1884	Hector d'Espouy			A thermal establishment
1885	François Paul André			A Medical Academy
1886	Alphonse Defrasse	Albert Louvet		A Palace for the Court of Auditors
1887	Georges Chedanne	Henri Eustache and Charles Heubès		A gymnasium
1888	Albert Tournaire			A Parliamentary Palace
1889		Constant-Désiré Despradelle	Demerlé	A casino by the sea
1890	Emmanuel Pontremoli			A monument to Joan of Arc
1891	Henri Eustache	François-Benjamin Chaussemiche		A central railway station
1892	Émile Bertone	Guillaume Tronchet		An Artillery Museum
1893	François-Benjamin Chaussemiche	Paul Dusart	Alfred-Henri Recoura	A Palace for Academics
1894	Alfred-Henri Recoura	Auguste-René-Gaston Patouillard Gabriel Héraud		A central School of Arts and Manufacture in the capital of a large country
1895	René Patouillard-Demoriane			An Exhibition Palace
1896	Louis-Charles-Henri Pille	Gustave Umbdenstock		A Naval School
1897	Eugène Duquesne			A votive church
1898	Léon Chifflot	André Arfvidson		A palace
1899	Tony Garnier	Henri Sirot		A central bank building
1900	Paul Bigot			Thermal baths and a casino

=== 20th century (architecture) ===
Year	Premier Prix	Deuxième Prix	Troisieme Prix/ Honorable Mention	Competition project
1901	Jean Hulot			An American Academy
1902	Henri Prost	Eugène Chifflot		A national print house
1903	Léon Jaussely	Jean Wielhorski and Henri Joulie		A public square
1904	Ernest Michel Hébrard	Pierre Leprince-Ringuet		A carpet manufactory
1905	Camille Lefèvre			A water tower
1906	Patrice Bonnet			A French college
1907	Charles Nicod			An observatory and scientific station
1908	Charles Louis Boussois			
1909	Maurice Boutterin			A colonial palace
1910	Georges-Fernand Janin			A sanatorium on the Mediterranean coast
1911	René Mirland	Paul Tournon		A monument to the glory of the independence of a large country
1912	Jacques Debat-Ponsan	Roger-Henri Expert		A casino in a spa town
1913	Roger Séassal	Gaston Castel		
1914	Albert Ferran			A military college
1919	Jacques Carlu and Jean-Jacques Haffner	Eugène-Alexandre Girardin and Louis Sollier; André Jacob		A palace for the League of Nations at Geneva
1920	Michel Roux-Spitz	Marc Brillaud de Laujardière		
1921	Léon Azéma	Maurice Mantout		A manufactory of tapestries and art fabrics
1922	Robert Giroud			A large Military development college
1923	Jean-Baptiste Mathon	Georges Feray		The residence of the French ambassador in Marocco
1924	Marcel Péchin			An institute of general botany
1925	Alfred Audoul	Marcel Chappey		A National School of Applied Arts
1926	Jean-Baptiste Hourlier			A summer residence for a Chief of State
1927	André Lecomte	André-Albert Dubreuil		An Institute of Archaeology and Art
1928	Eugène Beaudouin	Gaston Glorieux and Roger Hummel		An embassy in a large Far Eastern country
1929	Jean Niermans	Germain Grange and André Hilt		A palace for the Institute of France
1930	Achille Carlier	Noël Le Maresquier and Alexandre Courtois		A college of fine arts
1931	Georges Dengler	Georges Bovet		A French intellectual centre of propaganda abroad
1932	Camille Montagné	André Aubert and Robert Pommier		A summer residence in the mountains
1933	Alexandre Courtois	Robert Camelot and Charles-Gustave Stoskopf		A church of pilgrimage
1934	André Hilt	Georges Letélié and Pierre-Jean Guth		A permanent exhibition of contemporary art
1935	Paul Domenc			An institute of intellectual cooperation
1936	André Remondet	Georges Noël and Pierre Lablaude		A naval museum
1937	Georges Noël	Othello Zavaroni and Paul Jacques Grillo		A French Pantheon
1938	Henry Bernard	Pierre Dufau and Gonthier		A sports organisation centre
1939	Bernard Zehrfuss	Sachs and Sergent		A palace of the French colonial empire
1942 (?)	Raymond Gleize			
1943	André Chatelin and Jean Dubuisson			
1944	Claude Béraud	Henry Pottier		
1945	Jean Dubuisson and Jean de Mailly jointly			Palace for the Court of Justice
1946	Guillaume Gillet			Grand Foyer of the crews of the Fleet
1947	Jacques Cordonnier	Paul La Mache		Ministry of Arts
1948	Yves Moignet			
1949	Paul Vimond			A French college
1950	Jacques Perrin-Fayolle	Poutu, Audoul and Castel jointly, Xavier Arsène-Henry		A Mediterranean university
1951	Louis-Gabriel de Hoÿm de Marien	Bergerioux and Marriage		A conference and congress centre
1952	Louis Blanchet	Pierre-André Dufétel and Levard		Communal home of a large city
1953	Olivier-Clément Cacoub	Chaudonneret and Bourdon		Mount of Martyrs
1954	Michel Marot	Marty and Chauvin		A centre of African Research in Kano
1955	Ngô Viết Thụ	Pouradier Duteil and Maréchal		A votive sanctuary
1956	Serge Menil	Michel Folliasson		An Acropolis
1957	Jean-Marie Brasilier	Delb and Robert		A Palace of Natural Science
1958	Gérard Carton	Claude Bach and Menart		A Pantheon for Europe
1959	Gérard Carton	Tournier and Hardy		An international conference centre for drama and opera
1960	Jean-Claude Bernard	Doucet and Cacaut		Business centre of large capital city
1961		Jacques Labro		A monastery
1962		Jean-Loup Roubert and Christian Cacault		
1963	Jean-Louis Girodet	Jacques Lallemand		A marine institute
1964	Bernard Schoebel			An artificial island with arts centre and water sports
1965	Jean-Pierre Poncabaré			A foundation for the study of modern architecture
1967	Daniel Kahane	Michel Longuet and Aymeric Zublena	(last award)	A house for Europe in the event of a transformation of the center of Paris

== First Prize Winners in the Painting category ==
=== 17th century (painting) ===
- 1663 – Jean-Baptiste Corneille
- 1664 – Pierre Monier or Mosnier or Meunier
- 1665 – François Bonnemer
- 1666 – No award
- 1667 – Nicolas Rabon
- 1668 – François Verdier
- 1669 – Bon Boullogne
- 1670–71 – François Verdier
- 1672 – Alexandre Ubelesqui
- 1673 – Louis de Boullogne
- 1674 – Jacques de Montgobert
- 1675 – Claude Guy Hallé
- 1676 – Louis Chéron
- 1677 – No award
- 1678 – Louis Chéron
- 1679–80 – Charles Desforest
- 1681 – No award
- 1682 – Hyacinthe Rigaud
- 1683 – Gabriel Benoist
- 1684 – Gregor Brandmüller
- 1685 – Nicolas Bertin
- 1686 – Antoine Dieu
- 1687 – Jean Christophe
- 1688 – Daniel Sarrabat
- 1689 – Pierre-Jean-Baptiste de Lignières
- 1690 – Charles Gussin or Cussin
- 1691 – Sebert
- 1692 – Benoît Le Coffre
- 1693 – Henri de Favanne
- 1694 – Noël Neveu
- 1695 – Louis Galloche
- 1696 – Pierre Dulin
- 1697 – Pierre Dulin
- 1698 – Nicolas de Poilly the Younger (1675—1747)
- 1699 – Pierre-Jacques Cazes
- 1700 – Alexis Simon Belle

=== 18th century (painting) ===
- 1701 – Nicolas Hordubois
- 1702 – Duflos or Duflocq
- 1703 – Antoine Pesne
- 1704 – Jean Raoux
- 1705 – Auger Lucas
- 1706–08 – No award
- 1709 – Antoine Grison
- 1710 – Jean Giral or Girac
- 1711 – François Lemoyne
- 1712 – Venard
- 1713 – Sauteny or Lanteny
- 1714 – No award
- 1715 – Joseph Wamps
- 1716 – No award
- 1717 – Charles Lamy
- 1718–20 – No record
- 1721 – Charles-Joseph Natoire
- 1722 – No record
- 1723 – François Boucher
- 1724 – Charles-André van Loo
- 1725 – Louis-Michel van Loo
- 1726 – Allais
- 1727 – Pierre Subleyras
- 1728 – Jean-Charles Frontier
- 1729 – Duflot
- 1730 – Antoine Boizot
- 1731 – Lemesle
- 1732–33 – No record
- 1734 – Jean-Baptiste Marie Pierre
- 1735 – No record
- 1736 – Noël Hallé
- 1737 – Fournier
- 1738 – Charles-Amédée-Philippe van Loo
- 1739 – Louis-Joseph Le Lorrain
- 1740 – No record
- 1741 – Charles-Michel-Ange Challe
- 1742 – No award
- 1743 – Joseph-Marie Vien
- 1744 – No award
- 1745 – No record
- 1746 – No award
- 1747 – Pierre-Charles Le Mettay
- 1748 – Jean-Baptiste Hutin
- 1749 – Louis-Jean-François Lagrenée
- 1750 – Joseph Melling
- 1751 – Jean-Baptiste Deshays de Colleville
- 1752 – Jean-Honoré Fragonard
- 1753 – Charles Monnet
- 1754 – Jean-Pierre Chardin, jnr
- 1755 – Jean-François Amand
- 1756 – Hughes Taraval
- 1757 – Louis Jean-Jacques Durameau
- 1758 – Jean-Bernard Restout
- 1759 – Étienne de La Vallée Poussin
- 1760 – Simon Julien
- 1761 – Dominique Lefèvre-Desforges
- 1762 – Jacques-Philippe-Joseph de Saint-Quentin
- 1763 – Jean-Baptiste Alizard
- 1764 – Antoine-François Callet
- 1765 – Jean Bardin
- 1766 – François-Guillaume Ménageot
- 1767 – Jean-Simon Berthélemy
- 1768 – François-André Vincent
- 1769 – Joseph Barthélémy Le Bouteux
- 1770 – Anicet Charles Gabriel Lemonnier
- 1771 – Joseph-Benoît Suvée
- 1772 – Pierre-Charles Jombert
- 1773 – Pierre Peyron
- 1774 – Jacques-Louis David
- 1775 – Jean Bonvoisin
- 1776 – Jean-Baptiste Regnault
- 1777 – Jean-Gustave Taraval
- 1778 – Jean-Antoine-Théodore Giroust
- 1779 – Louis Gauffier
- 1780 – Jean-Pierre Saint-Ours
- 1781 – Jean-Baptiste de Vignaly
- 1782 – Antoine-Charles-Horace Vernet (dit Carle Vernet)
- 1783 – Jean-Baptiste Frédéric Desmarais
- 1784 – Jean Germain Drouais and Louis Gauffier
- 1785 – Victor-Maximilien Potain
- 1786 – Charles Meynier
- 1787 – François-Xavier Fabre
- 1788 – Etienne-Barthélémy Garnier
- 1789 – Anne-Louis Girodet de Roussy-Trioson
- 1790 – Jacques Réattu
- 1791 – Louis Lafitte and Charles Thévenin
- 1792 – Charles Paul Landon
- 1793 – No record
- 1794–96 – No award
- 1797 – Pierre-Narcisse Guérin, Louis-André-Gabriel Bouchet and Pierre Bouillon
- 1798 – Fulchran-Jean Harriet
- 1799 – Alphonse Gaudar de La Verdine and Alexandre-Romain Honnet

=== 19th century (painting) ===
- 1800 – Jean-Pierre Granger
- 1801 – Jean Auguste Dominique Ingres
- 1802 – Alexandre Menjaud
- 1803 – Merry-Joseph Blondel
- 1804 – Joseph Denis Odevaere
- 1805 – Félix Boisselier
- 1806 – Félix Boisselier
- 1807 – François Joseph Heim
- 1808 – Alexandre-Charles Guillemot
- 1809 – Jérôme-Martin Langlois
- 1810 – Michel Martin Drolling
- 1811 – Alexandre-Denis-Abel de Pujol
- 1812 – Louis-Vincent-Léon Pallière
- 1813 – François-Édouard Picot and Henri-Joseph de Forestier
- 1814 – Auguste Vinchon
- 1815 – Jean Alaux (known as "Le Romain")
- 1816 – Antoine Jean-Baptiste Thomas
- 1817 – Léon Cogniet, Achille Etna Michallon
- 1818 – Nicolas-Auguste Hesse
- 1819 – François Dubois
- 1820 – Amable-Paul Coutan
- 1821 – Joseph-Désiré Court, Jean-Charles-Joseph Rémond
- 1822 – No award
- 1823 – Auguste-Hyacinthe Debay and François Bouchot
- 1824 – Charles-Philippe Larivière
- 1825 – André Giroux
- 1825 – Sébastien Norblin
- 1826 – Éloi Firmin Féron
- 1827 – François-Xavier Dupré
- 1828 – No award
- 1829 – Jean-Louis Bézard
- 1830 – Émile Signol
- 1831 – Henri Frédéric Schopin
- 1832 – Jean-Hippolyte Flandrin
- 1833 – Eugène Roger
- 1834 – Paul Jourdy
- 1835 – No award
- 1836 – Dominique Papety and Charles Octave Blanchard
- 1837 – Jean Gilbert Murat
- 1838 – Isidore Pils
- 1839 – Ernest Hébert
- 1840 – Pierre-Nicolas Brisset
- 1841 – Auguste Lebouy
- 1842 – Victor Biennourry
- 1843 – Auguste Lebouy
- 1844 – Félix-Joseph Barrias
- 1845 – Jean-Achille Benouville
- 1846 – No award
- 1847 – Jules Eugène Lenepveu
- 1848 – No first prize
- 1849 – Gustave Boulanger
- 1850 – William-Adolphe Bouguereau, Paul Baudry
- 1851 – François Chifflart
- 1852 – No award
- 1853 – No award
- 1854 – Émile Lévy, Félix-Henri Giacomotti and Théodore-Pierre-Nicolas Maillot
- 1855 – No award
- 1856 – Félix Auguste Clément and Jules-Élie Delaunay
- 1857 – Charles Sellier
- 1858 – Jean-Jacques Henner
- 1859 – Benjamin Ulmann
- 1860 – Ernest Michel
- 1861 – Jules Joseph Lefebvre
- 1862 – No award
- 1863 – Joseph-Fortuné-Séraphin Layraud and Alphonse Monchablon
- 1864 – Diogène Maillart
- 1865 – Jules Machard
- 1866 – Henri Regnault
- 1867 – Joseph Blanc
- 1868 – Édouard-Théophile Blanchard
- 1869 – Luc-Olivier Merson
- 1870 – Fernand Lematte
- 1871 – Édouard Toudouze
- 1872 – Gabriel Ferrier
- 1873 – Aimé Morot
- 1874 – Paul-Albert Besnard
- 1875 – Léon Comerre
- 1876 – Joseph Wencker
- 1877 – Théobald Chartran
- 1878 – François Schommer and Julius Schmid
- 1879 – Alfred-Henri Bramtot
- 1880 – Henri Lucien Doucet
- 1881 – Louis Édouard Fournier
- 1882 – Gustave Popelin
- 1883 – Marcel Baschet
- 1884 – Henri Pinta
- 1885 – Alexis Axilette
- 1886 – Charles Lebayle
- 1887 – Henri-Camille Danger
- 1888 – No award
- 1889 – Ernest Laurent, Gaston Thys
- 1890 – André Devambez
- 1891 – Alexandre-Claude-Louis Lavalley
- 1892 – Georges-Auguste Lavergne
- 1893 – Maurice-Théodore Mitrecey
- 1894 – Auguste Leroux and Adolphe Déchenaud
- 1895 – Gaston Larée
- 1896 – Charles-Lucien Moulin
- 1897 – No award
- 1898 – Jean-Amédée Gibert and William Laparra
- 1899 – Louis Roger
- 1900 – Fernand Sabatté

=== 20th century (painting) ===
- 1901 – Laurent Jacquot-Defrance
- 1902 – Paul Sieffert and Victor-Oscar Guétin
- 1903 – André-Jean Monchablon and Yves Edgar Muller d'Escars
- 1904 – No award
- 1905 – No award
- 1906 – Georges Paul Leroux and François-Maurice Roganeau
- 1907 – Louis Léon Eugène Billotey and Émile Aubry
- 1908 – Jean Lefeuvre
- 1909 – Pierre Bodard
- 1910 – Jean Dupas
- 1911 – Marco de Gastyne
- 1912 – Gabriel Girodon
- 1913 – No award
- 1914 – Jean-Blaise Giraud, Jean Despujols and Robert Poughéon
- 1915–18 – No award
- 1919 – André Louis Pierre Rigal
- 1920 – No award
- 1921 – Emile-Marie Beaume and Constantin Font
- 1922 – Pierre-Henri Ducos de La Haille
- 1923 – Pierre Dionisi
- 1924 – René-Marie Castaing
- 1925 – Odette Pauvert (the first woman to receive the "First Grand Prize" in painting)
- 1926 – No award
- 1927 – No award
- 1928 – Paul-Robert Bazé, Daniel-Jules-Marie Octobre and Nicolas Untersteller
- 1929 – Alfred Giess
- 1930 – Yves Brayer
- 1931 – André Tondu
- 1932 – Georges Cheyssial
- 1933 – Roland-Marie Gérardin
- 1934 – Pierre Emile Henri Jérôme
- 1935 – No award
- 1936 – Lucien Fontanarosa and Jean Pinet
- 1937 – Pierre Robert Lucas
- 1938 – Madeleine Lavanture
- 1939 – Reynold Arnould
- 1940–42 – No award
- 1943 – Pierre-Yves Trémois and Yves Trévédy
- 1944 – Georges Marcel Jean Pichon
- 1945 – Pierre-Marie-Joseph Guyenot
- 1946 – José Fabri-Canti
- 1947 – Eliane Beaupuy
- 1948 – François Orlandini
- 1949 – No award
- 1950 – Françoise Boudet and Robert Savary
- 1951 – Daniel Sénélar
- 1952 – Paul Guiramand
- 1953 – André Brasilier
- 1954 – Armand Sinko
- 1955 – Paul Ambille
- 1956 – Henri Thomas
- 1957 – Arnaud d'Hauterives
- 1958 – Raymond Humbert
- 1959 – Arlette Budy
- 1960 – Pierre Carron
- 1961 – Joël Moulin
- 1962 – Freddy Tiffou
- 1963 – Roger Blaquière
- 1964 – Claude-Jean Guillemot
- 1965 – Jean-Marc Lange
- 1966 – Gérard Barthélemy
- 1967 – Thierry Vaubourgoin
- 1968 – Joël Froment (last award)

== First Prize Winners in the Sculpture category ==
=== 17th century (sculpture) ===
- 1665 – François Lespingola
- 1673 – Louis Lecomte aka Le Picard
- 1674 – Jacques Prou
- 1675 – Girardon, jnr
- 1676 – Pierre Laviron
- 1678 – Pierre Laviron
- 1680 – Jean Joly
- 1682 – Nicolas Coustou
- 1683 – Pierre Lepautre
- 1684 – Robert Doisy
- 1685 – Zéphirin Adam
- 1686 – Pierre Legros, jnr
- 1687 – Jean-Louis Lemoyne
- 1688 – Antoine Girardon
- 1689 – Robert Le Lorrain
- 1690 – Hubert Collinet or Colinet
- 1691 – François Regnaudin
- 1692 – Brodon
- 1693 – Benoît Le Coffre
- 1694 – René Frémin
- 1695 – Augustin Caillot
- 1696 – Augustin Caillot
- 1697 – Guillaume Coustou
- 1698 – Charles Charpentier
- 1699 – Jean de Fer
- 1700 – René Charpentier

=== 18th century (sculpture) ===
- 1701 – Joseph Van Clève
- 1702 – Jacques Loysel or Loizel
- 1703 – Pierre Villeneuve
- 1704 – Jean Leblanc, jnr
- 1705 – Jacques Bousseau
- 1706–08 – No award
- 1709 – François Dumont
- 1710 – Lefèvre
- 1711 – Pierre Bourlot
- 1712 – Jean-Baptiste Guyot
- 1713 – Martin
- 1714–15 – No award
- 1716 –
- 1717 – No award
- 1718 –
- 1721 – No award
- 1722 – Edmé Bouchardon
- 1723 – Lambert Sigisbert Adam
- 1724 –
- 1725 – Jean-Baptiste Lemoyne
- 1726 –
- 1727 – Jacques Roëttiers de la Tour
- 1728 – Vandervoort
- 1729 – François Ladatte
- 1730 – Claude-Clair Francin
- 1731 –
- 1732 – Jean-Baptiste Boudard
- 1733 –
- 1734 – No award
- 1735 – Guillaume II Coustou
- 1736 –
- 1737 – Le Marchand
- 1738 – Jacques Saly
- 1739 – Louis-Claude Vassé
- 1740 – Pierre-Philippe Mignot
- 1741 – François Gaspard Balthazar Adam
- 1742 – No award
- 1743 – Chasles
- 1744 – No award
- 1745 – Pierre Hubert Larchevêque
- 1746 – No award
- 1747 – Jean-Jacques Caffieri
- 1748 – Augustin Pajou
- 1749 – Guyard
- 1750 – Louis-Félix Delarue
- 1751 – Auvray
- 1752 – André Brenet
- 1753 – Jean-Baptiste d'Huez
- 1754 – Charles-Antoine Bridan
- 1755 – Pierre-François Berruer
- 1756 – Lebrun
- 1757 – Étienne-Pierre-Adrien Gois
- 1758 – Félix Lecomte
- 1759 – Claude Michel aka Clodion
- 1760 – Monot
- 1761 – Jean-Antoine Houdon
- 1762 – Louis-Simon Boizot
- 1763 – Boucher
- 1764 – Jacques-Philippe Beauvais
- 1765 – Pierre Julien
- 1766 – Nicolas Sénéchal
- 1767 – Louis-Jacques Pilon
- 1768 – Jean Guillaume Moitte
- 1769 – Jean Joseph Foucou
- 1770 – René Millot
- 1771 – Joseph Deschamps
- 1772 – François-Nicolas Delaistre
- 1773 – André Ségla
- 1774 – Pierre La Bussière
- 1775 – Barthélémy-François Chardigny
- 1776 – Antoine-Léonard Pasquier
- 1777 – François-Marie Suzanne
- 1778 – Jacques Lemaire
- 1779 – Louis-Pierre Deseine
- 1780 – Louis-Antoine Bacari
- 1781 – Jacques-Philippe Le Sueur
- 1782 – Claude Ramey
- 1783 – Augustin Félix Fortin
- 1784 – Antoine-Denis Chaudet
- 1785 – Claude Michallon
- 1786 – Edme-François-Étienne Gois
- 1787 – Barthélémy Corneille
- 1788 – Jacques-Edme Dumont
- 1789 – Antoine-François Gérard
- 1790 – François-Frédéric Lemot
- 1791 – Pierre-Charles Bridan
- 1792 – Auguste Marie Taunay
- 1793–96 – No award
- 1797 – Charles Antoine Callamard
- 1798 – Louis Delaville
- 1799 – Charles Dupaty
- 1800 –

=== 19th century (sculpture) ===
- 1801 – Joseph-Charles Marin & François-Dominique-Aimé Milhomme
- 1806 – Pierre-François-Grégoire Giraud
- 1809 – Henri-Joseph Ruxthiel
- 1811 – David d'Angers
- 1812 – François Rude
- 1813 – Jean-Jacques Pradier (dit James Pradier)
- 1815 – Étienne-Jules Ramey
- 1817 – Charles-François Lebœuf (dit Nanteuil)
- 1818 – Bernard-Gabriel Seurre (dit Seurre Aîné)
- 1819 – Abel Dimier
- 1820 – Georges Jacquot
- 1821 – Philippe Joseph Henri Lemaire
- 1823 – Augustin-Alexandre Dumont & Francisque Joseph Duret
- 1824 – Charles-Marie-Émile Seurre (dit Seurre jeune)
- 1826 – Louis Desprez
- 1827 – Jean-Louis Jaley & François Gaspard Aimé Lanno
- 1828 – Antoine Laurent Dantan (dit Dantan l'Aîné)
- 1829 – Jean-Baptiste-Joseph Debay (dit Debay fils)
- 1830 – Honoré-Jean-Aristide Husson
- 1832 – François Jouffroy & Jean-Louis Brian
- 1833 – Pierre-Charles Simart
- 1836 – Jean-Marie Bonnassieux & Auguste-Louis-Marie Ottin
- 1837 – Louis-Léopold Chambard
- 1838 – Nicolas-Victor Vilain
- 1839 – Théodore-Charles Gruyère
- 1841 – Georges Diebolt & Charles-Joseph Godde
- 1842 – Jules Cavelier
- 1843 – René-Ambroise Maréchal
- 1844 – Eugène-Louis Lequesne
- 1845 – Jean-Baptiste Claude Eugène Guillaume
- 1847 – Jacques-Léonard Maillet & Jean-Joseph Perraud
- 1848 – Gabriel-Jules Thomas
- 1849 – Louis Roguet
- 1850 – Charles-Alphonse-Achille Gumery
- 1851 – Gustave Adolphe Désiré Crauk
- 1852 – Alfred-Adolphe-Édouard Lepère
- 1854 – Jean-Baptiste Carpeaux
- 1855 – Henri-Michel-Antoine Chapu & Amédée Donatien Doublemard
- 1856 – Henri-Charles Maniglier
- 1857 – Joseph Tournois
- 1859 – Jean-Alexandre-Joseph Falguière & Louis-Léon Cugnot
- 1860 – Barthélemy Raymond
- 1861 – Justin-Chrysostome Sanson
- 1862 – Ernest-Eugène Hiolle
- 1863 – Charles-Arthur Bourgeois
- 1864 – Eugène Delaplanche & Jean-Baptiste Deschamps
- 1865 – Louis-Ernest Barrias
- 1868 – Marius-Jean-Antonin Mercié & Edme-Antony-Paul Noël (dit Tony Noël)
- 1869 – André-Joseph Allar
- 1870 – Jules-Isidore Lafrance
- 1871 – Laurent-Honoré Marqueste
- 1872 – Jules Coutan
- 1873 – Jean-Antoine-Marie Idrac
- 1874 – Jean Antoine Injalbert
- 1875 – Jean-Baptiste Hugues
- 1876 – Alfred-Désiré Lanson
- 1877 – Alphonse-Amédée Cordonnier
- 1878 – Edmond Grasset
- 1879 – Léon Fagel
- 1880 – Émile-Edmond Peynot
- 1881 – Jacques-Théodore-Dominique Labatut
- 1882 – Désiré-Maurice Ferrary
- 1883 – Henri-Édouard Lombard
- 1884 – Denys Puech
- 1885 – Joseph-Antoine Gardet
- 1886 – Paul-Gabriel Capellaro
- 1887 – Edgar-Henri Boutry
- 1888 – Louis-J. Convers
- 1889 – Jean-Charles Desvergnes
- 1890 – Paul-Jean-Baptiste Gasq
- 1891 – François-Léon Sicard
- 1892 – Hippolyte-Jules Lefebvre
- 1893 – Aimé-Jérémie-Delphin Octobre
- 1894 – Constant-Ambroise Roux
- 1895 – Hippolyte-Paul-René Roussel (dit Paul-Roussel)
- 1896 – Jean-Baptiste-Antoine Champeil
- 1897 – Victor Ségoffin
- 1898 – Camille Alaphilippe
- 1899 – André-César Vermare
- 1900 – Paul-Maximilien Landowski

=== 20th century (sculpture) ===
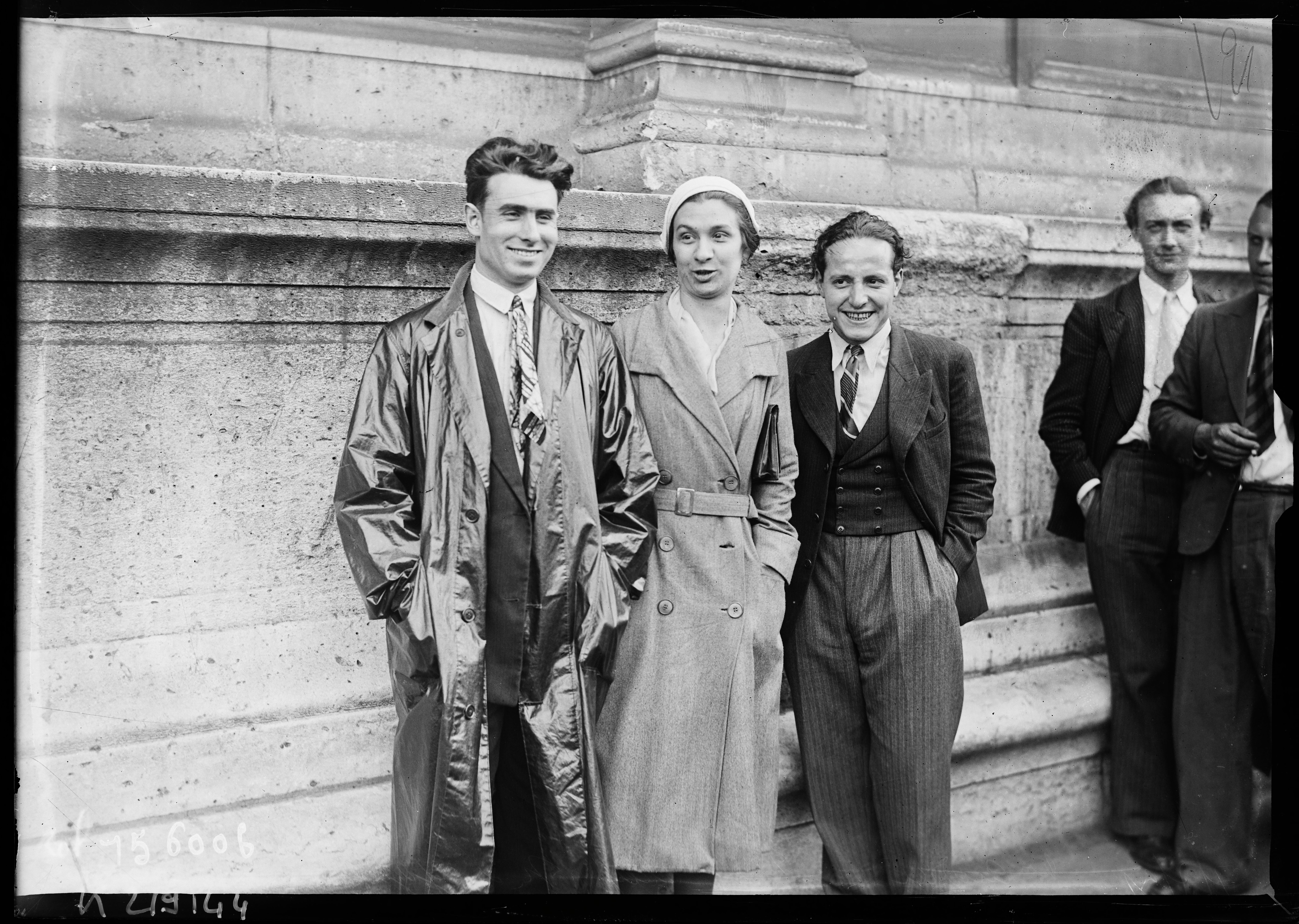
1931 winners: René Andrei (right) shared second price with Hélène Bouley-Hue (middle), while Louis Leygue (left) won.

- 1901 – Henri Bouchard
- 1902 – Alphonse Camille Terroir
- 1903 – Eugène Désiré Piron
- 1904 – Jean-Baptiste Larrivé
- 1905 – Lucien Brasseur
- 1906 – François-Maurice Roganeau
- 1907 – Not awarded
- 1908 – Marcel Gaumont and Henri Camille Crenier
- 1909 – Felix Benneteau-Desgrois
- 1910 – Louis Lejeune
- 1911 – Lucienne Heuvelmans (the first woman to receive the "First Grand Prize")
- 1912 – Siméon Charles Joseph Foucault
- 1913 – Armand Martial
- 1914 – Marc Leriche
- 1917 _ Stefano Zuech
- 1919 – Alfred Janniot and Raymond Delamarre jointly
- 1920 – Charles Georges Cassou
- 1921 – Élie-Jean Vézien
- 1922 – Jean Dominique Aubiné
- 1923 – Louis Bertola
- 1924 – André Augustin Sallé
- 1925 – Victor Jules Évariste Jonchère
- 1926 – René Letourneur
- 1927 – Raymond Couvègnes
- 1928 – Pierre Honoré
- 1929 – Félix Joffre
- 1930 – André Bizette-Lindet
- 1931 – Louis Leygue
- 1932 – Henri Lagriffoul
- 1933 – Ulysse Gémignani
- 1934 – Albert Bouquillon
- 1935 – Claude Bouscau
- 1936 – André Greck
- 1937 – Raymond Granville Barger?
- 1937 – Maurice de Bus
- 1938 – Adolphe Charlet
- 1939 – René Leleu
- 1942 – Maurice Gambier d'Hurigny
- 1943 – Lucien Fenaux
- 1944 – Francis Pellerin
- 1945 – Pierre Thézé
- 1946 – Gaston Watkin
- 1947 – Léon Bosramiez
- 1948 – Jacques Gotard
- 1949 – Jean Lorquin
- 1950 – Maurice Calka
- 1951 – Albert Féraud
- 1952 – Henri Derycke
- 1953 – Alain Métayer
- 1954 – Jacqueline Bechet-Ferber
- 1955 – Kenneth Ford
- 1956 – Claude Goutin
- 1957 – Cyrille Bartolini
- 1958 – Bruno Lebel
- 1959 – Georges Jeanclos
- 1960 – No award
- 1961 – Glynn Williams
- 1961 – Georges Maurice Dyens and André Barelier jointly
- 1962 – No award
- 1963 – Philippe Thill and Jacqueline Deyme jointly
- 1964 – Louis Lutz
- 1965 – No award
- 1966 – Joséphine Chevry
- 1967 – Michel Fargeot and Anne Houllevigue jointly
- 1968 – Maryse Voisin (last award)

== First Prize Winners in the Engraving category ==
The engraving prize was created in 1804.

=== 19th century (engraving) ===
- 1804 – Claude-Louis Masquelier (first award)
- 1805 – Nicolas-Pierre Tiolier
- 1806 – Théodore Richomme
- 1807 – Jacques-Édouard Gatteaux
- 1810 – Durand
- 1811 – Armand Corot
- 1812 – Benjamin-Eugène Bourgeois
- 1813 – Henri-François Brandt
- 1814 – François Forster
- 1815 –
- 1816 – Jacques Joseph Coiny
- 1817 – Joseph-Sylvestre Brun
- 1818 – André-Benoit Taurel
- 1819 – Ursin-Jules Vatinelle
- 1820 – Constantin-Louis-Antoine Lorichon
- 1823 –
- 1824 – Antoine-François Gelée
- 1826 – Pierre François Eugène Giraud
- 1827 – No award
- 1828 – Joseph-Victor Vibert
- 1830 – Achille-Louis Martinet
- 1831 – Eugène André Oudiné
- 1832 –
- 1834 – François Augustin Bridoux and Louis Adolphe Salmon
- 1835 – Jean-Baptiste Eugène Farochon
- 1836 – First prize not awarded
- 1838 – Charles-Victor Normand and Victor Florence Pollet, jointly
- 1839 – André Vauthier
- 1840 – Jean-Marie Saint-Eve
- 1842 – Louis-Désiré-Joseph Delemer
- 1843 – Louis Merley
- 1844 – Jean-Ernest Aubert
- 1846 – Joseph-Gabriel Tourny
- 1848 – Jacques-Martial Devaux; Louis-Félix Chabaud (postponed from 1847)
- 1850 – Gustave Bertinot
- 1852 – Charles-Alphonse-Paul Bellay
- 1854 – Joseph-Paul-Marius Soumy
- 1855 – Alphée Dubois
- 1856 – Claude-Ferdinand Gaillard
- 1860 – Jean Lagrange
- 1861 – Jules-Clément Chaplain
- 1866 – Charles-Jean-Marie Degeorge
- 1868 – Charles-Albert Waltner
- 1869 – Arthur Soldi
- 1870 – Achille Jacquet
- 1872 – Daniel Dupuis
- 1875 – Oscar Roty
- 1878 – Louis-Alexandre Bottée; Charles Théodore Deblois
- 1881 – Henri-Auguste-Jules Patey
- 1883 – William Barbotin
- 1886 – Jean Patricot
- 1887 – Frédéric-Charles-Victor de Vernon
- 1888 – Henri Le Riche
- 1890 – Charles Pillet
- 1892 – Hippolyte Lefebvre
- 1894 – Jean Antonin Delzers
- 1896 – Arthur Mayeur
- 1898 – Jean Coraboeuf
- 1899 – René Grégoire
- 1900 – Jean Antonin Delzers

=== 20th century (engraving) ===
- 1902 – Lucien Pénat; Pierre-Victor Dautel
- 1903 – Eugène Piron
- 1904 – Louis Busiére
- 1905 – Julien-Louis Mérot
- 1906 – Henri-Lucien Cheffer; Raoul Serres
- 1908 –
- 1909 – Victor Hammer
- 1910 – Jules Piel
- 1912 –
- 1914 – André Lavrillier
- 1919 – Albert Decaris; Gaston Lavrillier
- 1920 – Pierre Matossy
- 1921 – Pierre Gandon
- 1922 – Raymond-Jacques Brechenmacher
- 1923 – Lucien Bazor
- 1927 – Frederick George Austin
- 1928 – Robert Cami; Charles-Émile Pinson
- 1929 – Aleth Guzman-Nageotte
- 1930 – Jules Henri Lengrand
- 1931 – Arthur Henderson Hall
- 1932 – Louis Muller
- 1934 – Paul Lemagny
- 1935 – Albert de Jaeger
- 1936 –
- 1942 – Raymond Joly
- 1945 – Raymond Tschudin
- 1946 – Paul Guimezanes
- 1948 – Jean Delpech
- 1950 – Georges Arnulf
- 1952 – Claude Durrens
- 1957 – Émile Rousseau
- 1960 – Jean Asselbergs; Pierre Béquet
- 1964 – Brigitte Courmes (the only woman to receive the "First Grand Prize" in engraving)
- 1966 – Jean-Pierre Velly
- 1968 – Michel Henri Viot (last award)

== First Prize Winners in the Musical Composition category ==
The required composition was originally a cantata for solo voice and orchestra; later one male and female voice were specified; and later still three voices. Titles of the pieces have generally been restricted to "cantata", "lyric scene" or "dramatic scene".

=== 19th century (musical composition) ===
- 1803 – Albert Androt
- 1804 – First Prize not awarded
- 1805 – Victor Dourlen ("first" First Grand Prize) and Ferdinand Gasse ("second" First Grand Prize)
- 1806 – Guillaume Bouteiller
- 1807 – First Prize not awarded
- 1808 – Auguste Blondeau
- 1809 – Louis Joseph Daussoigne-Méhul
- 1810 – Désiré Beaulieu
- 1811 – Hippolyte André Jean Baptiste Chélard
- 1812 – Louis Joseph Ferdinand Hérold ("first" First Grand Prize) and Félix Cazot ("second" First Grand Prize)
- 1813 – Auguste Mathieu Panseron
- 1814 – Pierre-Gaspard Roll
- 1815 – François Benoist
- 1816 – First Prize not awarded
- 1817 – Désiré-Alexandre Batton
- 1818 – First Prize not awarded
- 1819 – Fromental Halévy ("first" First Grand Prize) and Jean Massin aka Turina ("second" First Grand Prize)
- 1820 – Aimé Ambroise Simon Leborne
- 1821 – Victor Rifaut
- 1822 – Joseph-Auguste Lebourgeois
- 1823 – Édouard Boilly ("first" First Grand Prize) and Louis Ermel ("second" First Grand Prize)
- 1824 – Auguste Barbereau
- 1825 – Albert Guillon
- 1826 – Claude Paris
- 1827 – Jean-Baptiste Guiraud
- 1828 – Guillaume Despréaux
- 1829 – First Prize not awarded
- 1830 – Hector Berlioz ("first" First Grand Prize) and Alexandre Montfort ("second" First Grand Prize)
- 1831 – Eugène-Prosper Prévost
- 1832 – Ambroise Thomas
- 1833 – Alphonse Thys (1807–1879)
- 1834 – Antoine Elwart
- 1835 – Ernest Boulanger (1815–1900)
- 1836 – Xavier Boisselot (1811–1893)
- 1837 – Louis Désiré Besozzi
- 1838 – Georges Bousquet (1818–1854)
- 1839 – Charles Gounod
- 1840 – François Bazin
- 1841 – Aimé Maillart
- 1842 – Alexis Roger (1814–1846)
- 1843 – First Prize not awarded
- 1844 – Victor Massé (1822–1884) ("first" First Grand Prize) and Renaud de Vilbac ("second" First Grand Prize)
- 1845 – First Prize not awarded
- 1846 – Léon Gastinel
- 1847 – Louis Deffès
- 1848 – Jules Duprato
- 1849 – First Prize not awarded
- 1850 – Joseph Charlot
- 1851 – Jean-Charles-Alfred Deléhelle
- 1852 – Léonce Cohen
- 1853 – Charles Galibert
- 1854 – Adrien Barthe
- 1855 – Jean Conte
- 1856 – First Prize not awarded
- 1857 – Georges Bizet ("first" First Grand Prize) and Charles Colin (1832–1881) ("second" First Grand Prize)
- 1858 – Samuel David
- 1859 – Ernest Guiraud
- 1860 – Émile Paladilhe
- 1861 – Théodore Dubois
- 1862 – Louis-Albert Bourgault-Ducoudray
- 1863 – Jules Massenet
- 1864 – Victor Sieg
- 1865 – Charles Lenepveu
- 1866 – Émile Louis Fortuné Pessard (1843–1917)
- 1867 – First prize not awarded
- 1868 – Alfred Pelletier-Rabuteau ("first" First Grand Prize) and Eugène Wintzweiller ("second" First Grand Prize)
- 1869 – Antoine Taudou
- 1870 – Henri Maréchal ("first" First Grand Prize) and Charles-Édouard Lefebvre ("second" First Grand Prize)
- 1871 – Gaston Serpette
- 1872 – Gaston Salvayre
- 1873 – Paul Puget
- 1874 – Léon Ehrhart
- 1875 – André Wormser
- 1876 – Paul Hillemacher ("first" First Grand Prize) and Paul Véronge de La Nux (1853–1928) ("second" First Grand Prize)
- 1877 – First Prize not awarded
- 1878 – Clément Broutin ("first" First Grand Prize) and Samuel Rousseau (1853–1904) ("second" First Grand Prize)
- 1879 – Georges Hüe
- 1880 – Lucien Hillemacher
- 1881 – First Prize not awarded
- 1882 – Georges Marty ("first" First Grand Prize) and Gabriel Pierné ("second" First Grand Prize)
- 1883 – Paul Vidal
- 1884 – Claude Debussy
- 1885 – Xavier Leroux
- 1886 – Augustin Savard
- 1887 – Gustave Charpentier
- 1888 – Camille Erlanger
- 1889 – First prize not awarded
- 1890 – Gaston Carraud ("first" First Grand Prize) and Alfred Bachelet ("second" First Grand Prize)
- 1891 – Charles Silver
- 1892 – First prize not awarded
- 1893 – André Bloch ("first" First Grand Prize) and Henri Büsser ("second" First Grand Prize)
- 1894 – Henri Rabaud
- 1895 – Omer Letorey
- 1896 – Jules Mouquet
- 1897 – Max d'Ollone
- 1898 – First prize not awarded
- 1899 – Charles-Gaston Levadé ("first" First Grand Prize) and Edmond Malherbe ("second" First Grand Prize)
- 1900 – Florent Schmitt

=== 20th century (musical composition) ===
- 1901 – André Caplet
- 1902 – Aymé Kunc
- 1903 – Raoul Laparra
- 1904 – Raymond-Jean Pech
- 1905 – Victor Gallois ("first" First Grand Prize) and Marcel Samuel-Rousseau ("second" First Grand Prize)
- 1906 – Louis Dumas
- 1907 – Maurice Le Boucher
- 1908 – André Gailhard
- 1909 – Jules Mazellier
- 1910 – Noël Gallon
- 1911 – Paul Paray
- 1912 – First prize not awarded
- 1913 – Lili Boulanger (the first woman to receive the "First Grand Prize" in music) and Claude Delvincourt jointly
- 1914 – Marcel Dupré
- 1915–1918 – WWI – No awards
- 1919 – Marc Delmas ("first" First Grand Prize) and Jacques Ibert ("second" First Grand Prize)
- 1920 – Marguerite Canal
- 1921 – Jacques de La Presle
- 1922 – First prize not awarded
- 1923 – Jeanne Leleu ("first" First Grand Prize) and Francis Bousquet ("second" First Grand Prize)
- 1924 – Robert Dussaut
- 1925 – Louis Fourestier
- 1926 – René Guillou
- 1927 – Edmond Gaujac
- 1928 – Raymond Loucheur
- 1929 – Elsa Barraine
- 1930 – Tony Aubin
- 1931 – Jacques Dupont aka Jacque-Dupont
- 1932 – Yvonne Desportes
- 1933 – Robert Planel
- 1934 – Eugène Bozza
- 1935 – René Challan
- 1936 – Marcel Stern
- 1937 – Victor Serventi
- 1938 – Henri Dutilleux
- 1939 – Pierre Maillard-Verger
- 1940 – No competition
- 1941 – No competition
- 1942 – Alfred Desenclos
- 1943 – Pierre Sancan
- 1944 – Raymond Gallois-Montbrun
- 1945 – Marcel Bitsch ("first" First Grand Prize) and Claude Pascal ("second" First Grand Prize)
- 1946 – Pierre Petit
- 1947 – Jean-Michel Damase
- 1948 – Odette Gartenlaub
- 1949 – Adrienne Clostre
- 1950 – Éveline Plicque-Andréani
- 1951 – Charles Chaynes
- 1952 – Alain Weber
- 1953 – Jacques Castérède
- 1954 – Roger Boutry
- 1955 – Pierre Max Dubois
- 1956 – Jean Aubain
- 1957 – Alain Bernaud
- 1958 – Noël Lancien
- 1959 – Alain Margoni
- 1960 – Gilles Boizard
- 1961 – Christian Manen
- 1962 – Alain Petitgirard
- 1963 – Yves Cornière
- 1964 – First prize not awarded
- 1965 – Thérèse Brenet and Lucie Robert-Diessel jointly
- 1966 – Monic Cecconi-Botella
- 1967 – Michel Rateau
- 1968 – Alain Louvier (last award)
- List of all the winners of the Prix de Rome for musical composition

== Prix de Rome (Netherlands) ==
A Prix de Rome was also established in the Kingdom of Holland by Lodewijk Napoleon to award young artists and architects. During the years 1807–1810 prize winners were sent to Paris and onwards to Rome for study. In 1817, after the Netherlands had gained its independence, King Willem I restarted the prize; though it took until 1823 before the new "Royal Academies" of Amsterdam and Antwerp could organize the juries. Suspended in 1851 it was reinstated in 1870 by William III of the Netherlands. Since then the winners have been selected by the Rijksakademie in Amsterdam under the main headings of architecture and the visual arts.

== Prix de Rome (Belgium) ==
The Belgian Prix de Rome (Dutch: Prijs van Rome) is an award for young artists, created in 1832, following the example of the original French Prix de Rome. The Royal Academy of Fine Arts Antwerp organised the prize until 1920, when the national government took over. The first prize is also sometimes called the Grand Prix de Rome. There were distinct categories for architecture, painting, sculpture and music.

== See also ==
- Académie de France Rome
- American Academy in Rome
- American School of Classical Studies at Athens
- American Schools of Oriental Research
- British School at Rome
- Deutsches Archäologisches Institut Rom
- Rome Prize
- List of European art awards
