= Bridan =

Bridan can refer to:

- Charles-Antoine Bridan, French sculptor

- Pierre-Charles Bridan, French sculptor, son of Charles-Antoine Bridan

- No One World Bridan, army of wedding-themed artificial beings in the Japanese television series No.1 Sentai Gozyuger
