= Gaston Redon =

French architect, educator (1853–1921)

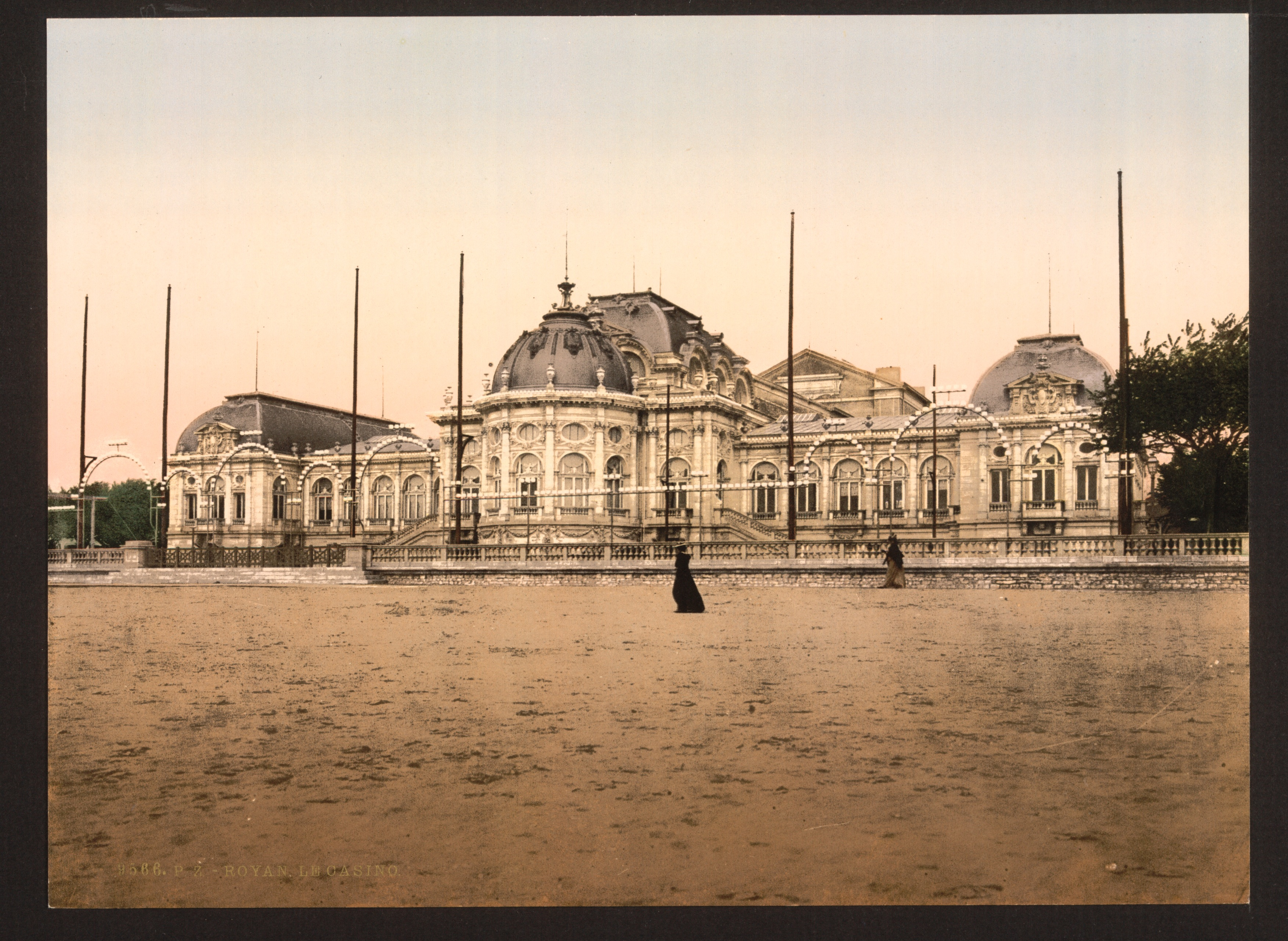
The Casino at Royan, 1895 (destroyed in 1945)

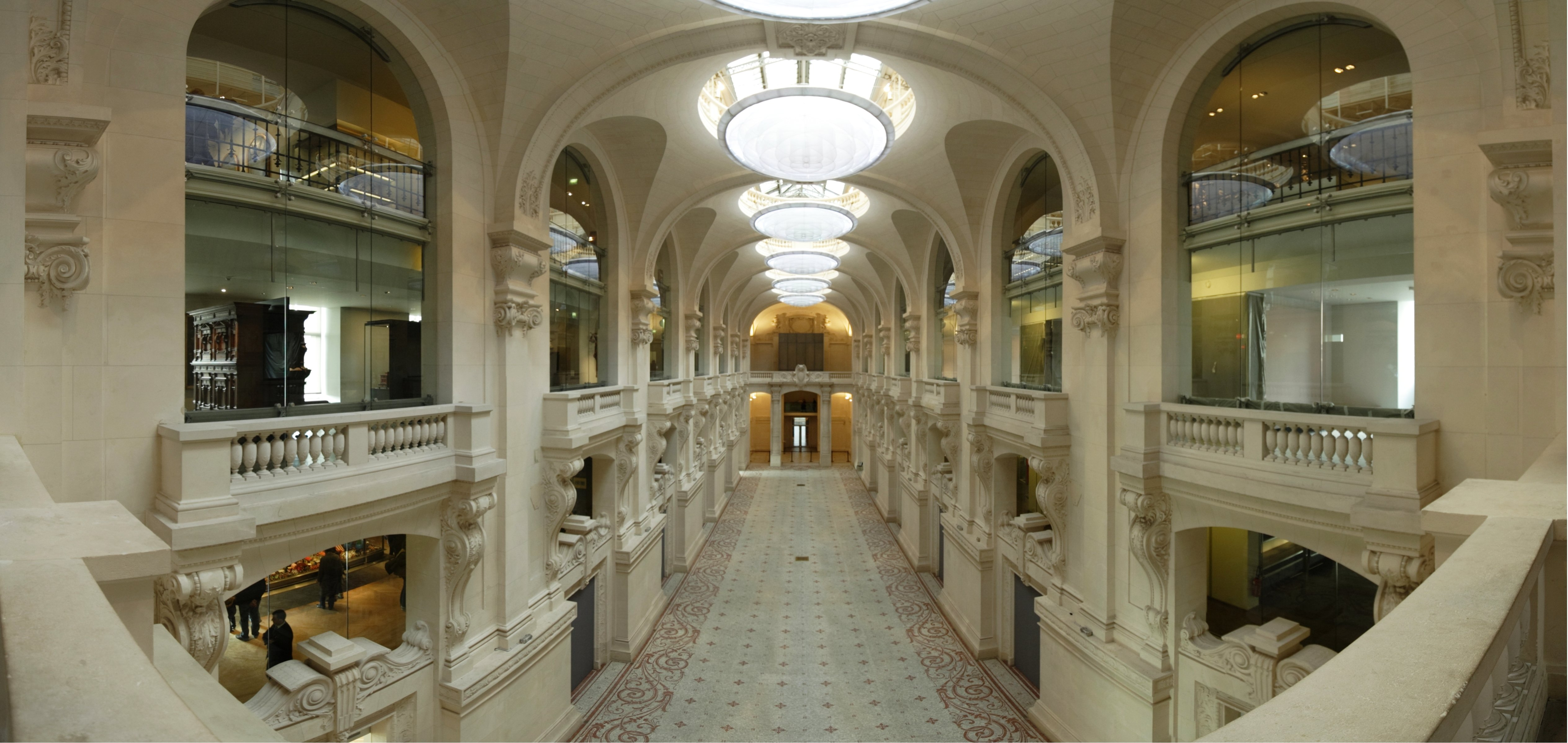
interior, Museum of Decorative Arts, Louvre, 1905

Gaston Redon (28 October 1853 – 20 November 1921) was a French architect, teacher, and graphic artist.

== Biography ==
Redon was born in Bordeaux, Aquitaine, to a prosperous family, the younger brother of artist Odilon Redon. Gaston attended the École des Beaux-Arts in the atelier of Louis-Jules André, and took the Prix de Rome for architecture in 1883. This entitled him to three years at the French Academy in Rome at the Villa Medici in Rome, Italy, from 1884 to 1887, where he met and became friends with the French composer Claude Debussy.

After his return to Paris, Redon was made the official architect of the Louvre museum. The rebuilding and expansion of the Pavillon de Marsan (the most northwestern wing of the palace) between 1900 and 1905 to accommodate the Museum of Decorative Arts amounts to his major built work.

Redon was elected to the Académie des Beaux-Arts in May 1914, and, jointly with Alfred-Henri Recoura, ran an architecture atelier at the Ecole. His students included French architects Henri Marchal, Roger-Henri Expert, and Louis-Hippolyte Boileau, among others.

== Works ==
His work includes:

- the tomb of César Franck, Montparnasse Cemetery, 1894
- the casino at Royan, 1895 (destroyed 1945)
- Museum of Decorative Arts, Pavillon de Marsan, Louvre, 1900–1905

== See also ==
- List of Académie des Beaux-Arts members: Architecture
- List of French architects

== Sources ==
- online biography (in French)
