= Rodolphe Bresdin =

French draughtsman and engraver

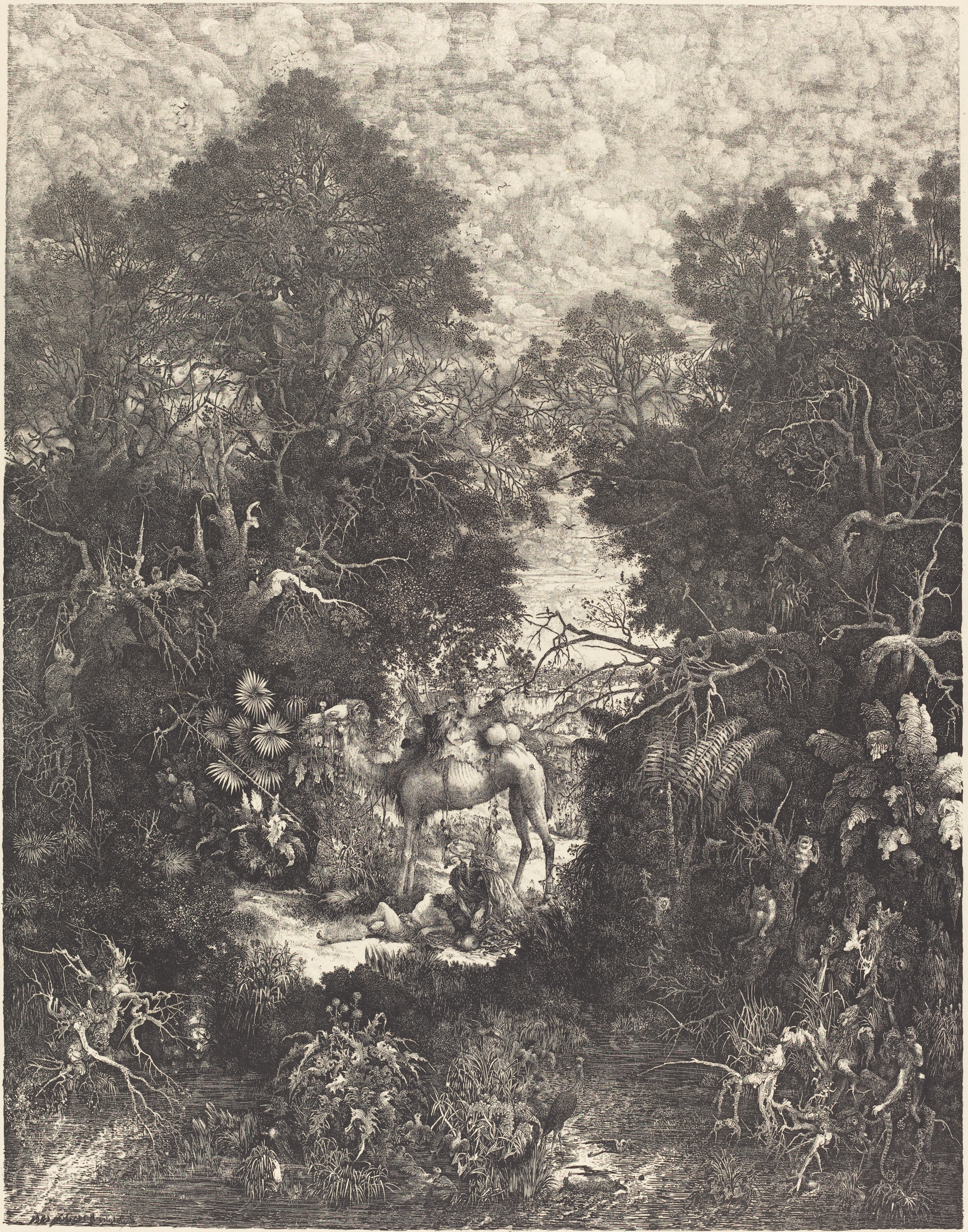
Le Bon Samaritain, 1861, by Rodolphe Bresdin

Rodolphe Bresdin (12 August 1822 – 11 January 1885) was a French draughtsman and engraver.

He was born in Le Fresne-sur-Loire. He spent his childhood in the Breton countryside. A family row left him homeless in Paris where he became part of the bohemian milieu with Charles Baudelaire, Henri Murger and Victor Hugo. After the counter revolution he walked 678 kilometres to Toulouse and took to living in the open air, workmen's and fishermen's huts. After he traveled with his wife and six children to Canada in pursuit of the dream of 'living off the land' he was brought back to France by Hugo and the bohemian writers and artists. He became sreparated from his family and died in a garret room in Sèvres.

== Work ==
His fantastic works, full of strange details, particularly attracted Charles Baudelaire, Théophile Gautier, Joris-Karl Huysmans, Robert de Montesquiou and André Breton. Odilon Redon was his pupil. Bresdin influenced contemporary artists like Jacques Moreau, George Rubel, Jean-Pierre Velly, and Philippe Mohlitz. Bresdin produced one hundred and forty etchings, twenty lithographs and a number of pen and ink drawings difficult to estimate.

Huysmans described in his novel À rebours ('Against Nature', alternative translation, 'Against the Grain') how his aesthete hero, Des Esseintes, has just savoured the prints of Jan Luyken, "an old Dutch engraver almost unknown in France":

In the adjoining room, the vestibule, a larger apartment panelled with cedar wood the colour of a cigar box, were ranged in rows other engravings and drawings equally extraordinary.

Bresdin's 'Comedy of Death' was one, where an impossible landscape bristling with trees, coppices and thickets taking the shape of demons and phantoms, swarming with birds having rat's heads and tails of vegetables, from a soil littered with human bones, vertebrae, ribs and skulls, spring willows, knotted and gnarled, surmounted by skeletons tossing their arms in unison and chanting a hymn of victory, while a Christ flies away to a sky dappled with little clouds; a hermit sits pondering, his head between his hands, in the recesses of a grotto; a beggar dies, worn out with privations, exhausted with hunger, stretched on his back, his feet extended towards a stagnant pool.

Another was 'the Good Samaritan' by the same artist, an immense pen and ink drawing lithographed, a wild entanglement of palms, service trees, oaks, growing all together in defiance of seasons and climates, an outburst of virgin forest, crammed with apes, owls and screech owls, cumbered with old stumps shapeless as roots of coral, a magic wood, pierced by a clearing dimly revealing far away, beyond a camel and the group of the Samaritan and the men who fell by the wayside, a river and behind it again a fairy-like city climbing to the horizon line, rising to meet a strange-looking sky, dotted with birds, woolly with rolling clouds, swelling as it were, with bales of vapour.

You would have thought it the work of an early Italian master or a half-developed Albert Dürer, composed under the influence of opium.' ('Against the Grain',

New York: Dover, 1971, p. 59)

Bresdin was, in part, a product of the Breton countryside with its sagacious, bardic folklore traditions, later beloved of Gauguin and his circle, and in part a refugee from the Paris Bohemia of Henri Murger with its dolorous, witty intonations. His portrayals of the household interiors of the rural poor show empathy with their inhabitants and rapport with the imaginative hinterland of their psyches. His series of the Holy Family's flight to Egypt was highly praised by Redon, who thought it Bresdin's best work, and by de Montesquiou.
