= Louis Delaville =

French sculptor (1763–1841)

Louis Delaville (1763–1841) was a French sculptor. He specialized in terracotta figures, often representing subjects from antiquity, mythology, and daily life.

Delaville was born in Jouy-sous-Thelles (Oise) on August 20, 1763. He studied in Paris under Louis-Simon Boizot (1743–1809). Among his earliest notable works is the bust of Hugues-Adrien Joly, curator at the Bibliothèque Nationale (1797). During his Paris years his production was characterized by Neoclassical models and themes. As other relevant sculptors of the period, such as Philippe-Laurent Roland (1746–1816), Joseph-Charles Marin (1759–1834), and Jacques-Edme Dumont (1761–1844), Delaville exploited the sensual antiquarianism highly valued by collectors throughout Europe. However, his hedonism was soon nuanced with a moral bent exalting civic virtues, as exemplified by his scenes of learning.

Delaville won first place at the Prix de Rome for sculpture in 1798 with his work Marcellus having all the artistic monuments of Syracuse placed on a boat. He was awarded a Silver Medal in the Douai Salon of 1807.

After marrying Jeanne-Marie Moreau on June 26, 1809, he settled in Lens, where he continued to be active as a producer of terracotta statuettes, usually depicting scenes of peasant daily life.

Delaville died in Lens on January 1, 1841.

== Representative works ==
Marcellus having all the art monuments of Syracuse placed on a boat. 1798.

The great-grandchildren of the painter François Bucher playing.Terracotta group. 1799. Louvre, Paris.

Bust of Christ. Terracotta. 1802. Beauvais (Oise), Musée de l’Oise.

Time. Terracotta. Douai (Nord), Musée de la Chartreuse.

Oedipus and Antigone. Terracotta. Musée des Beaux-arts de Lille.

Friendship. Terracotta statuette. Musée des Beaux-arts de Lille.

Hocédé. Terracotta statuette. 1818. Roubaix (Nord), Musée d’Art et d’Industrie, La Piscine.

Bonaparte in consul uniform. Troyes (Aube), Musée d'Art d'Archéologie et de Sciences Naturelles.
