= Félix Boisselier =

French painter

Félix Boisselier "the elder" (13 April 1776 – 12 January 1811) was a French historical painter.

Boisselier was born at Damphal (Haute-Marne), and in early life was employed as draughtsman in a manufactory of decorative papers. At the time of the Revolution he was thrown into prison, and after regaining his liberty entered the studio of Regnault. In 1805 he won the Prix de Rome with his Death of Demosthenes, but the customary stay in Rome was not offered as part of the award that year. He won the prize a second time in 1806, and later in the year went to Rome, where he died in 1811. His Death of Adonis, exhibited in 1812, is now in the Louvre.
