= Guillaume Despréaux =

French composer (1802–1865)

Guillaume Despréaux (20 September 1802 – 14 June 1865) was a French composer who won the Prix de Rome in 1828.

== Career ==
Born as "Guillaume Ross" in Clermont-Ferrand, Despréaux studied at the Conservatoire de Paris with François-Joseph Fétis and Henri Montan Berton. From 1824 onwards he worked with the Théâtre du Gymnase dramatique (formerly Théâtre de Madame), which at the time was directed by Charles-Gaspard Delestre-Poirson. He appeared next to Virginie Déjazet and Léontine Fay in vaudevilles by Eugène Scribe.

Despréaux won the Premier Grand Prix de Rome with the cantata Herminie se couvrant des armes de Clorinde in 1828, while Berlioz who had also participated in the competition, returned empty-handed. Despréaux went to Rome in 1829 where he composed, among other works, a Requiem and a Dies Irae.

Back in Paris, he composed mainly theatre music. His opera Le Souper du mari was premiered at the Opéra-Comique in 1833, followed by La Dame d'honneur. Despréaux died aged 62 in Paris.
