= François Denis Née =

French engraver

François Denis Née (1732 – 19 August 1817) was a French engraver. He was born and died in Paris.

He trained under Jacques-Philippe Le Bas and opened a shop with Louis-Joseph Masquelier the Elder in the 1770s on rue des Francs-Bourgeois, moving to rue de Fleurus after the French Revolution, where they produced lithographs.

He is most notable for his engravings of the works of Jean-Baptiste Lallemand as well as his participation in Les Conquêtes de l'Empereur de Chine, a major work commissioned by the Jesuits Jean-Denis Attiret, Giuseppe Castiglione, Ignaz Sichelbart and Jean Damascene. This was a series of 12 complementary engravings coordinated by Charles-Nicolas Cochin, with copperplates engraved in Paris between 1772 and 1774 at the expense of the Qianlong sovereign.

He also worked for the views of the Temple of Diana in Nismes, under the French engraver Claude-René-Gabriel Poulleau. Together with other artists they marked the fame of Charles-Louis Clérisseau and his Antiquités de la France.

His pupils included Joseph C. Maillet (1751–1811), a publisher and printseller.

== Sources ==
- "www.purl.org/inha/agorha/002/15770". purl.org.
