= Julien Guadet =

French architect (1834–1908)

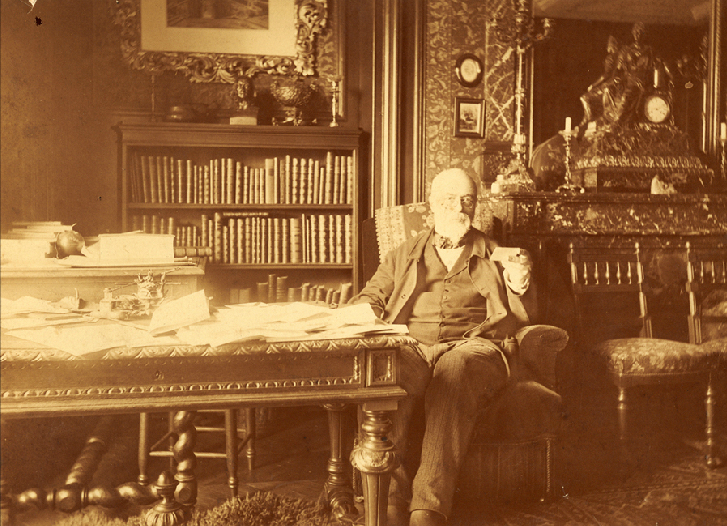
Julien Guadet

Julien Guadet (1834–1908) was a French architect, theoretician and professor at the École des Beaux-Arts, Paris.

== Biography ==
He was the son of Joseph Guadet, a man of letters, and a grandnephew of the Girondin deputy Marguerite-Élie Guadet. His son, Paul Guadet (1873–1931), was also a renowned architect.

Admitted to the École des Beaux-Arts de Paris in 1853, he studied under Henri Labrouste and later under Louis-Jules André. In 1863, along with his friend Louis-Jules André, he was one of the leaders of the student architects' movement against the 1863 reform of the École des Beaux-Arts and against the appointment of Eugène Viollet-le-Duc as professor of aesthetics and art history.

The following year, in 1864, he won the Prix de Rome.

During the last third of the 19th century, he held numerous official positions in the fields of architecture and higher education in France. A professor at the École nationale supérieure des beaux-arts in Paris and head of one of the three official studios beginning in 1871, he was appointed professor of theory in 1894. Edmond Paulin succeeded him the following year as head of his studio.

As an auditor at the Council of Civil Buildings, he applied for the position of diocesan architect as early as 1869. After becoming a government building inspector, he was appointed diocesan architect of Ajaccio in 1875, then of Montauban and Rennes in 1883, and finally of Saint-Brieuc in 1892. He ended his career as Inspector General of Civil Buildings and National Palaces.

In particular, he collaborated with Charles Garnier (architect) on the construction of the Paris Opera House, designed the Louvre Central Post Office, and oversaw the reconstruction of the Comédie-Française following its fire on March 8, 1900.

He was promoted to Officer of the Legion of Honour in 1899.
