= Jean-Louis Brian =

French sculptor

Jean-Louis Brian (1805 Avignon-1864 Paris) was a French sculptor.

Brian was a pupil of David d'Angers. In 1832, he won, together with François Jouffroy, the Premier Grand Prix de Rome in sculpture with his statue Capanée foudroyé sous les murs de Thèbes.

== Main works ==
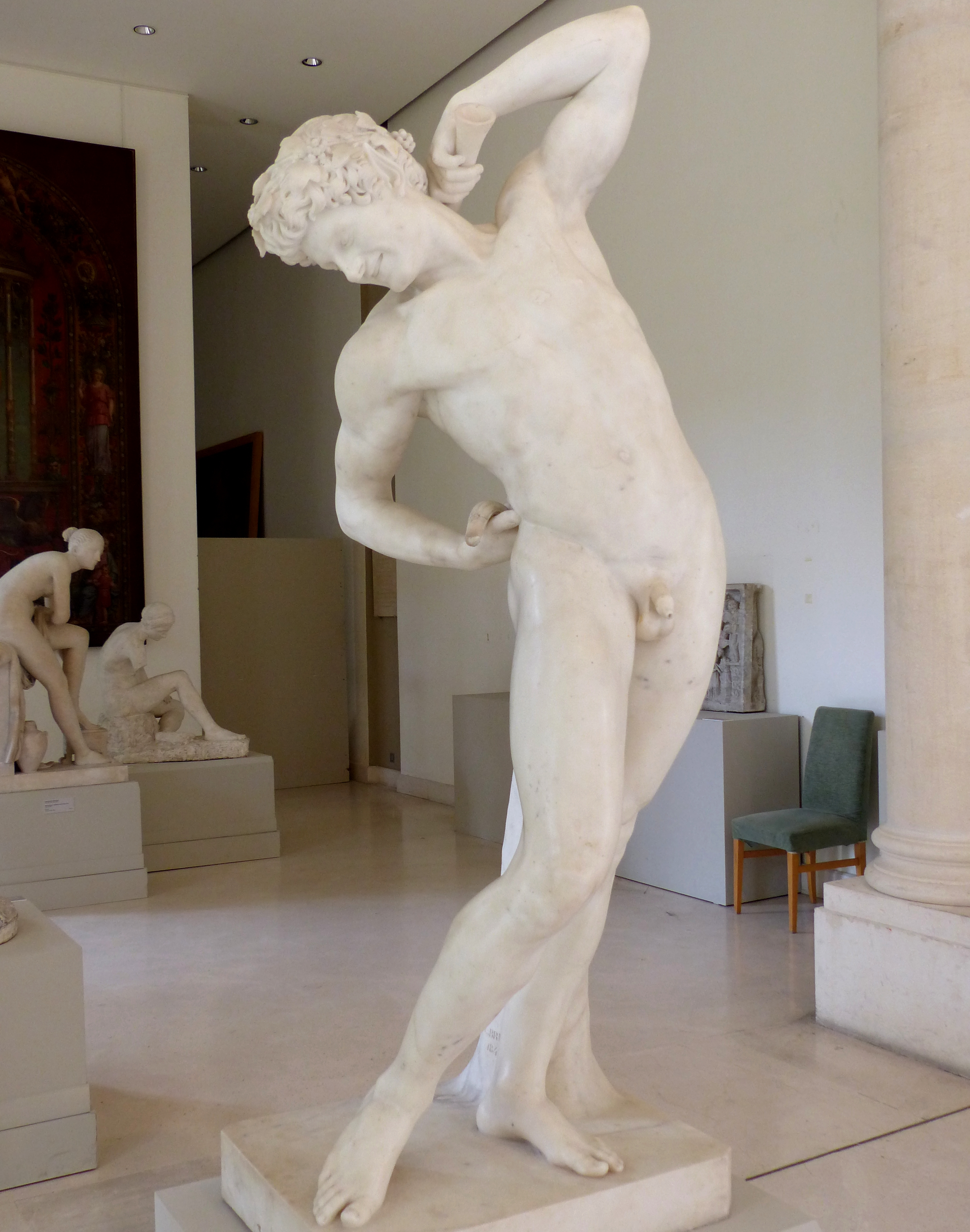
Calvet, sculptures004 BRIAN Jean-Louis Faune1840b

- Jeanne d'Albret, statue, stone, Paris, Jardin du Luxembourg
- Saint Marc, statue, stone, Paris, place Franz Liszt, facade of the church of Saint Vincent de Paul
- Caryatid, stone, Paris, Palais du Louvre
- Portrait of Pierre-Marie Baillot, violinist, 1772–1842, marble, Versailles, Palace of Versailles
- Portrait of Joseph Romain-Desfossés, admiral, 1798–1864, bust, marble, Versailles, Palace of Versailles
- Portrait of Leo Strozzi, prior of Capua, general of the galleys, 1515–1554, 1840, bust, plaster, Versailles, Palace of Versailles
- Faun standing looking at its tail, Avignon, Calvet Museum, marble, 1840
