= Guillaume Bouteiller =

French composer

Pierre-Guillaume (de) Bouteiller (28 October 1787 – 11 November 1860) was a French composer.

== Career ==
Bouteiller was born in Paris and entered the Conservatoire de Paris, then presented himself in 1806 at the Prix de Rome (created in 1803) where he was awarded a first prize for his cantata Hero and Leander, to a text by Saint-Victor. Despite this first success, he preferred to decline the offer of the trip to Rome. Following this first, a series of other withdrawals caused a scandal during the Empire.

In 1817, his comic opera Le Trompeur sans le vouloir was premiered at the Théâtre Feydeau after a libretto by Jean-François Roger and Auguste Creuzé de Lesser. After the failure of the opera, Bouteiller apparently gave up composing. His cantata was more recently performed in 2007 by the Orchestre National de Montpellier with singer Ana Maria Labin.
