= Ulysse Gémignani =

French sculptor (1906–1973)

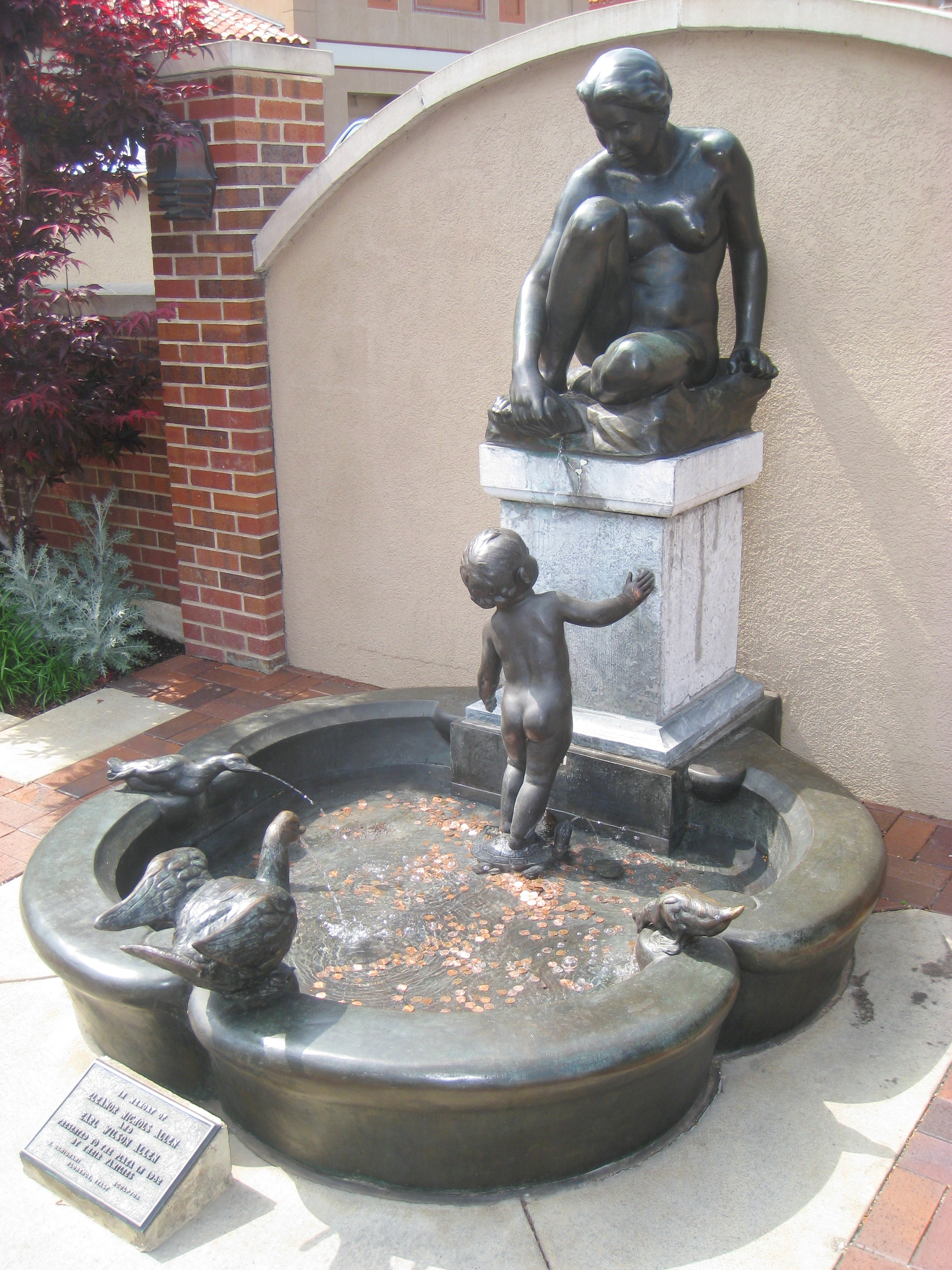
One of Ulysse Gémignani's sculptures at the Country Club Plaza, Kansas City, Missouri

Ulysse Jean-Baptiste Gemignani (1906 in Paris – 1973) was a French sculptor. He was the husband of the French composer Yvonne Desportes whom he met when they were both prize-winners of the Prix de Rome staying at the Villa Médicis in 1934.
