= Georges-Ernest Coquart =

French architect

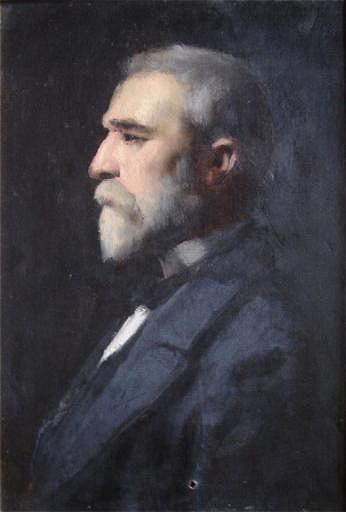
Georges-Ernest Coquart, by Jean-Jacques Henner (1895)

Georges-Ernest Coquart, or Ernest-Georges Coquart (9 June 1831 in Paris – 9 April 1902 in Paris) was a French architect.

== Biography ==
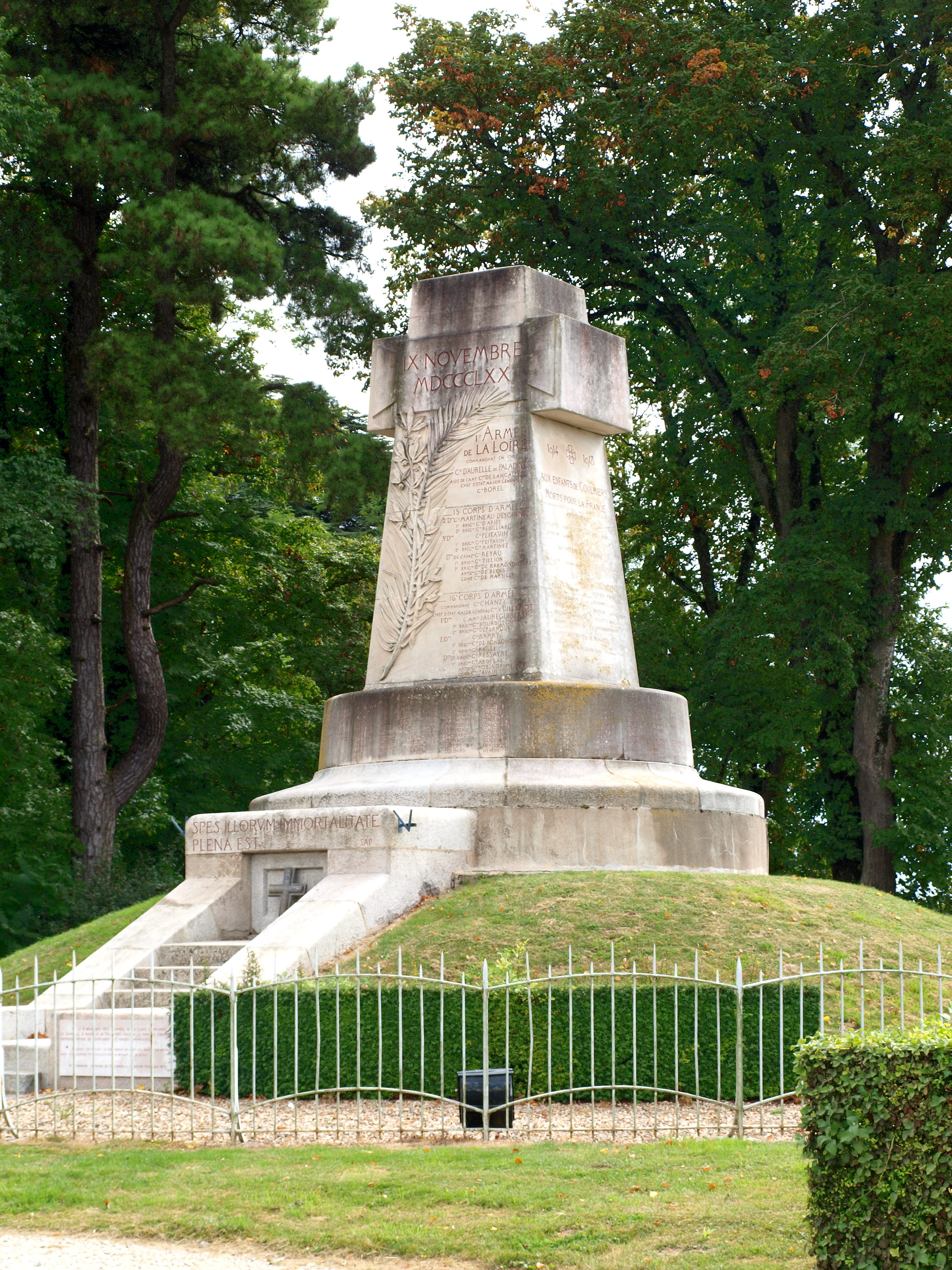
Monument to the Battle of Coulmiers

His father, François-Henri Coquart (1800-1885), was also an architect. At the age of sixteen, he entered the École des Beaux-Arts, where he studied in the workshop of Louis-Hippolyte Lebas. In 1858, after five attempts, he won the Prix de Rome with his plans for an "Imperial Hotel", devoted to disabled Navy veterans.

From 1859 to 1863, he studied at the Académie de France à Rome, but his poor health prevented him from sending much material home. By 1866, he had recovered sufficiently to carry out an archaeological mission on the island of Samothrace.

Upon returning to Paris, he was named inspector of works for the Court of Cassation. In 1871, he became their official architect. The year before, he had succeeded Félix Duban as architect of the École. In that capacity, he completed their "Glazed Courtyard", and installed a Renaissance museum in the chapel with its adjoining corridor. In 1875, he was appointed architect for the Diocese of Laval, and designed a monument commemorating the Battle of Coulmiers, in Loiret. This led to his becoming a Knight in the Legion of Honor.

His many responsibilities kept him busy over the coming years. From 1879 to 1881, he designed a chapel for the seminary in Laval (destroyed in World War II). At the same time, he designed and oversaw construction of the Grand Chamber at the Court, which occupied him for over a decade. He also taught at the École, where he was named a Professor in 1883. Five years later, he was elected to the Académie des Beaux-Arts, taking Seat #8 for architecture.

Increasingly, he found himself criticized for working too slowly; leading to his dismissal from the Court and the École in 1890. He ended his career as Secretary of the General Council for Civil Buildings. He also served on the jury at several competitions.

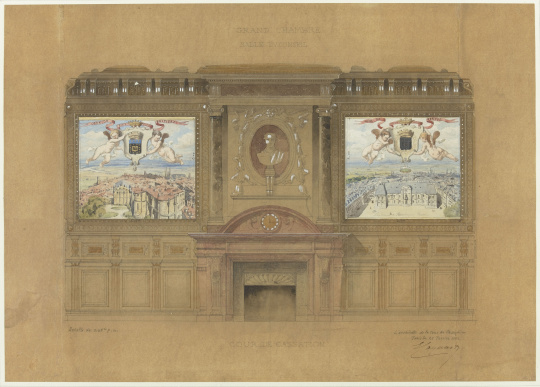
Design for the Grand Chamber at the Court of Cassation
