= Gilles Boizard =

French composer (1933–1987)

Gilles Boizard (1 August 1933 – 5 May 1987) was a French composer.

== Life ==
Born in Juniville, Ardennes, Boizard, who grew up in a small village in the Ardennes, had piano lessons before studying at the Conservatoire de Paris with Yves Nat. After winning a second prize in 1959, he won the "Premier Grand Prix" in 1960 with the Cantate du Printemps in the competition for the Prix de Rome.

After a stay at the Villa Medici in Rome from 1961 to 1964, he returned to the Conservatoire de Paris, where he worked as professor for Solfège. A few years later he also became director of the competitions of the "Union Française des Artistes et Musiciens" (U.F.A.M). He also performed as a concert pianist and accompanist.

Boizard composed a number of chamber music works, as well as piano arrangements for the UCAM competitions and music pedagogical works.

Boizard died in Paris.

== Works ==
- Berceuse en carillon for piano, 1965
- Partita: Prélude, Aria, Interlude, Toccata for piano, 1965
- Offrande d'Automne for piano, 1966
- Diptyque "Aux statues de Bomarzo" for bass trombone and piano, 1967
- Par le sentier bleu for piano, 1968
- Musette for piano, 1969
- Deux Esquisses. A l'estompe. A la pointe sèche for harp, 1969
- Fantaisie for bassoon and piano, 1971
- Onze Leçons de solfège, avec accompagnement de piano, 2 vol., 1972
- Onze Leçons de solfège, sans accompagnement de piano, 2 vol, 1972
- Accordéondes for accordion, 1973
- Ballade for double bass and piano, 1977
