= Louis-Joseph Masquelier =

Louis-Joseph Masquelier or Masquelier the Elder (21 February 1741 – 26 May 1811) was a French draughtsman and engraver. Born in Cysoing near Lille in northern France, he died in Paris. He was very close to François-Denis Née, with whom he studied under Jacques-Philippe Le Bas. His son Claude-Louis Masquelier was also an engraver and lithographer.

== Sources ==
- "www.purl.org/inha/agorha/002/15774". purl.org.
