= Francis Pellerin =

French sculptor

- Born: 2 April 1915; Cancale, Ille-et-Vilaine, France
- Died: 30 August 1998 (aged 83); Rennes, Ille-et-Vilaine, France
- Education: École des Beaux-Arts
- Occupation: Sculptor

Francis Pellerin (2 April 1915 - 30 August 1998) was a French sculptor.

== Early life ==
Francis Pellerin was born on 2 April 1915 in Cancale. His father was a sailor. He graduated from the École des Beaux-Arts in Paris.

== Career ==
Pellerin taught Sculpture at the École des Beaux-Arts in Rennes. He won the Prix de Rome in 1944. He designed a large sculpture in the Lycée Professionel Jean-Guéhenno in Vannes and another sculpture on the campus of the University of Western Brittany in Brest. He also designed furniture inside churches designed by architect Yves Perrin, like the Saint-Yves Church and the Saint-Benoit Church in Rennes.

Pellerin exhibited his work at the Galerie Hautefeuille and the Salon des Réalités Nouvelles in Paris.

== Death and legacy ==
Pellerin died on 30 August 1998 in Rennes. His work was exhibited posthumously at the Museum of Fine Arts of Rennes in 2005.
