= Louis-Jules André =

French academic architect (1819–1890)

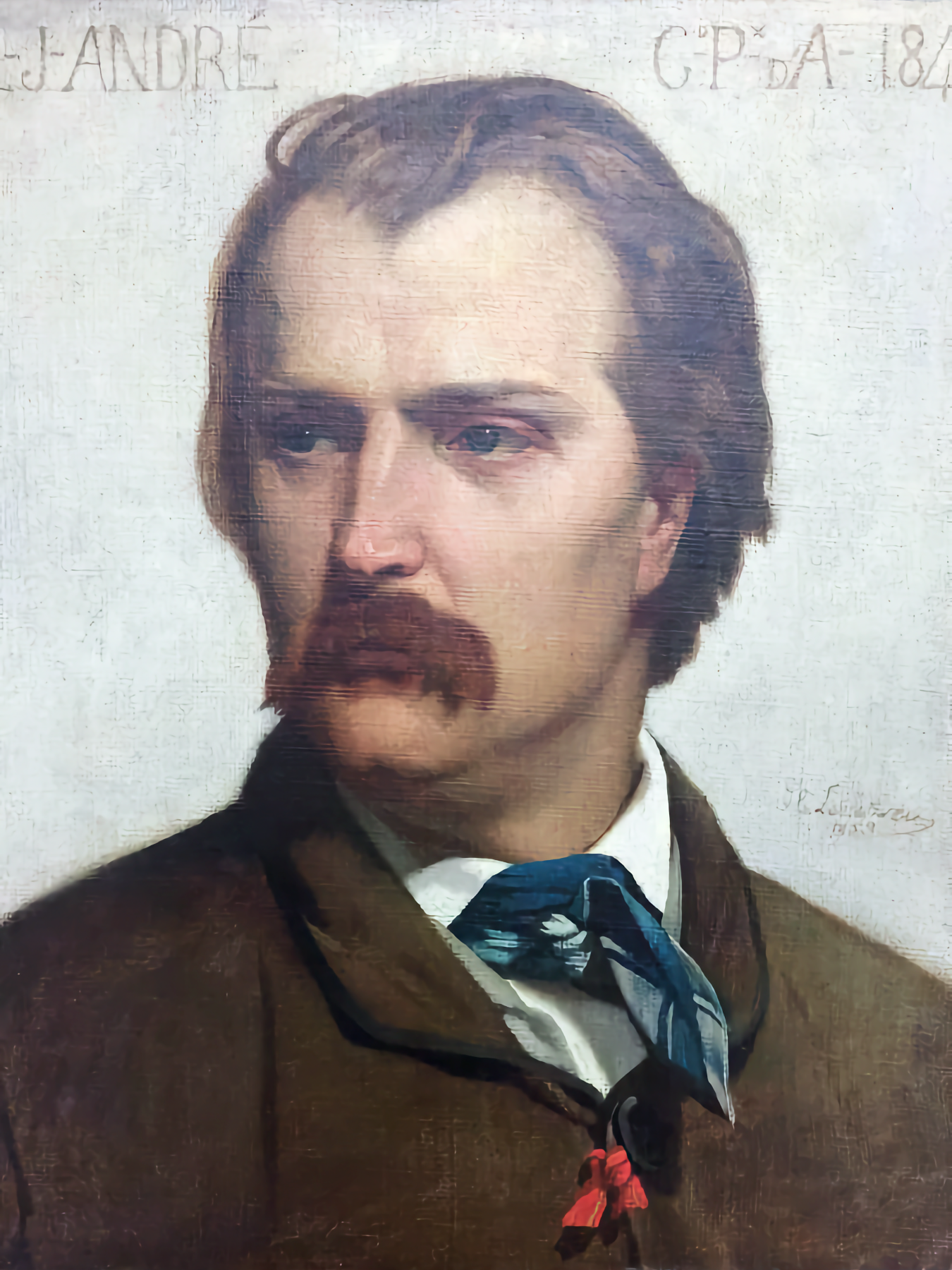
- portrait by Eugène Lenepveu
- Born: Louis Jules André; 24 June 1819 former 11th arrondissement of Paris
- Died: 30 January 1890 (aged 70) rue d'Assas
- Occupation: Architect
- Awards: Prix de Rome (1847); Chevalier of the Legion of Honour (1867); Officer of the Legion of Honor (1880); Commander of the Legion of Honour (1889)

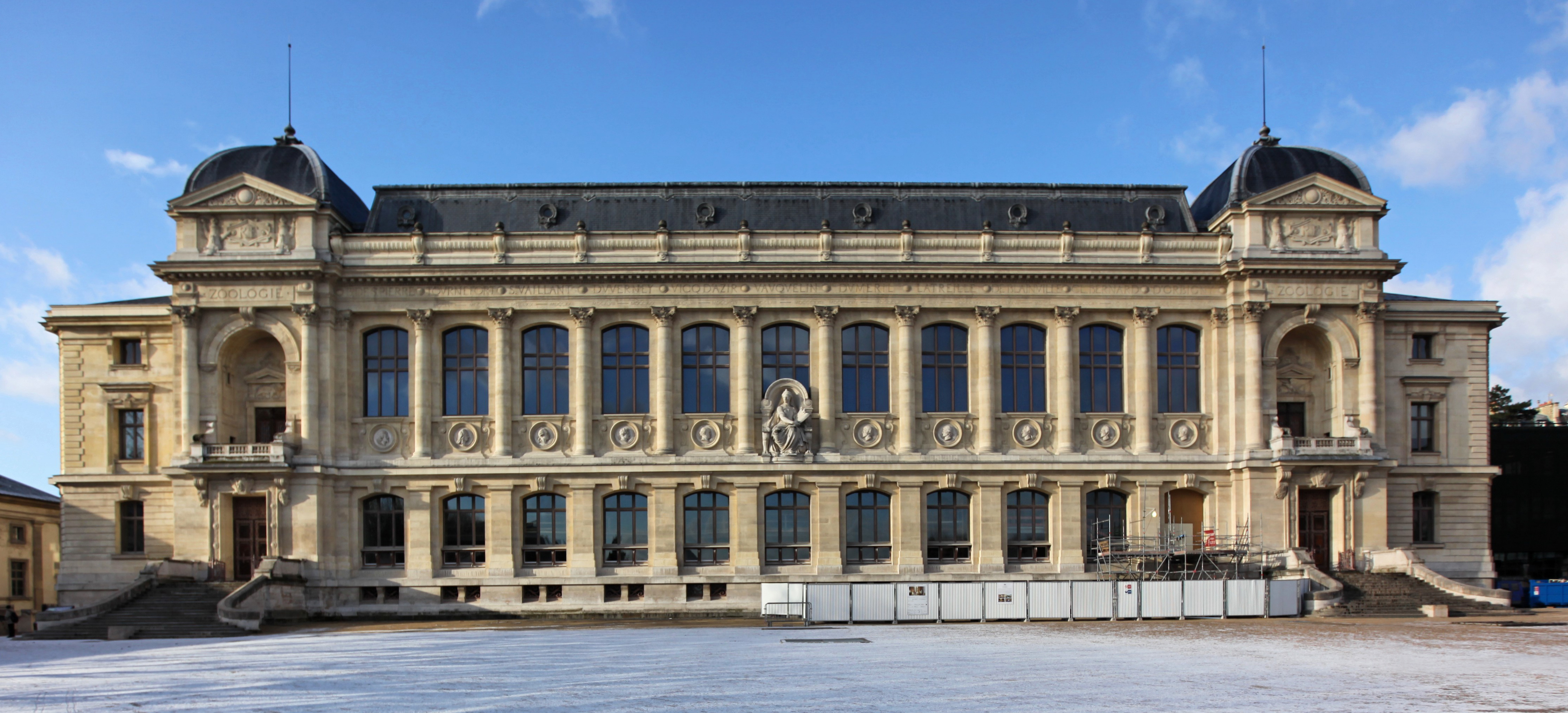
Gallery of Evolution (formerly galerie de Zoologie, 'Gallery of Zoology'), Jardin des Plantes, Paris

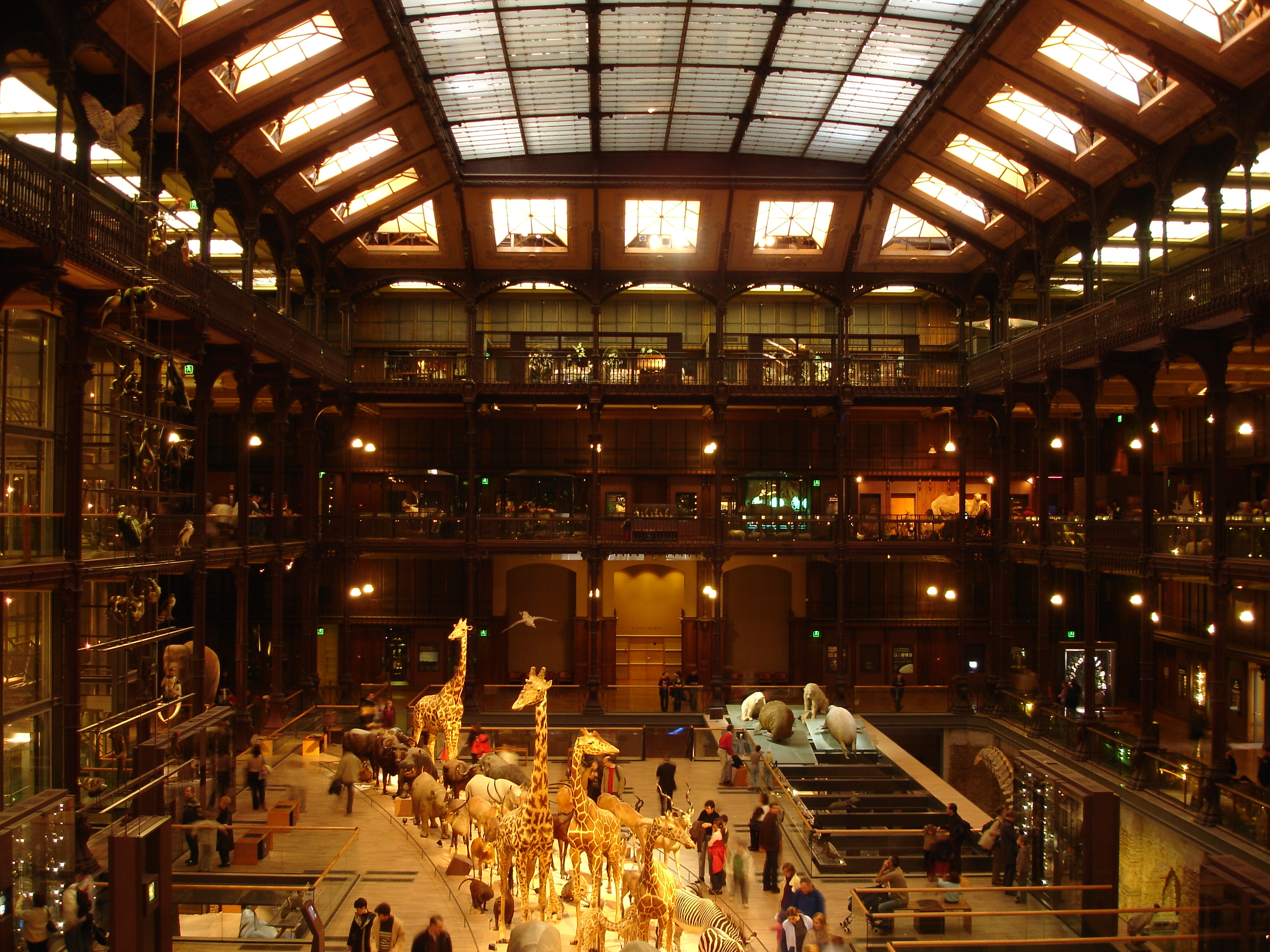
Gallery of Evolution, interior

Louis-Jules André (French pronunciation: [lwi ʒyl ɑ̃dʁe]; 24 June 1819 – 30 January 1890) was a French academic architect and the head of an important atelier at the École des Beaux-Arts.

== Biography ==
Born in Paris, André attended the École des Beaux-Arts and took the Prix de Rome in architecture in 1847, attending the Villa Medici in Rome from 1848 through 1852, with some time spent in Sicily and Greece.

His best-known work was probably carried out for the French National Museum of Natural History : the galerie de Zoologie ('Gallery of Zoology', since 1994 renamed as "Gallery of Evolution") in the Jardin des Plantes in Paris, a transitional work combining classical rhythms and ornamental details with cast-iron structure and a glass roof. Also for the French Museum of Natural History, André designed a large greenhouse, the first jardin d'hiver (winter garden) in the Jardin des Plantes. Inaugurated in 1889, this large greenhouse was demolished in 1934 and replaced on the same footprint by the current jardin d'hiver of the Jardin des Plantes, inaugurated in 1937 and designed by architect René-Félix Berger (1878–1954).

Among other honors André was a Commander of the Legion of Honor.

== Atelier André ==
The atelier André (the André workshop) produced some 500 students altogether, eight winners of the Prix de Rome, and even an alumni association founded in 1883 with 140 members. The graduates included:

- Paul Bigot (1870–1942), French architect
- Louis Bonnier (1856–1946), French architect and urban planner
- Warren Richard Briggs (1850–1933), American architect
- Julien Guadet (1834–1908), French architect and theorist of architectural composition
- Thomas Hastings (1860–1929), American architect, later of Carrère and Hastings.
- Victor Laloux (1850–1937), French architect who would in turn head the workshop after André's death
- Bernard Maybeck (1862–1957), American architect
- Emmanuel Pontremoli (1865–1956), French architect and archaeologist
- Henry Hobson Richardson (1838–1886), American architect (briefly)
- Guillaume Tronchet (1867–1959), French architect
