= Jean-Pierre Velly =

French painter

- Born: 14 September 1943; Audierne, France
- Died: 26 May 1990 (aged 46); Trevignano Romano
- Education: Ecole des Beaux Arts de Toulon; École Nationale Supérieure des Beaux-Arts; French Academy in Rome
- Known for: etching, painting, drawing

Jean-Pierre Velly (14 September 1943, Audierne, France – 26 May 1990) was a Breton etcher, draftsman and painter.

In 1965, after attending the Ecole des Beaux Arts de Toulon, he began study at the École Nationale Supérieure des Beaux-Arts in Paris. The following year he won the "Grand Prix de Rome" for etching. In 1967 he moved to Rome for three years to work under Balthus at Villa Medici, the French Academy. From 1970 he lived at Formello, a small village near Rome, where he worked for the next twenty years.

In 1971 he began exhibiting at Rome's Don Chisciotte Gallery, and started working in silverpoint, and painting in watercolor, particularly for the series Velly pour Corbière (1976–1978) from the poems of Tristan Corbiere, and Bestiaire Perdu (1978–1980). In the 1980s his subjects turned to landscapes, still life, life studies, trees and self portraits; using pencil, china ink, watercolor and oil.

In 1990, he was the victim of a boating accident and drowned in Lake Bracciano; his body was never recovered. Since then his work has been exhibited in Italy, France and Germany.
