= Pierre-Charles Bridan =

French sculptor (1766–1836)

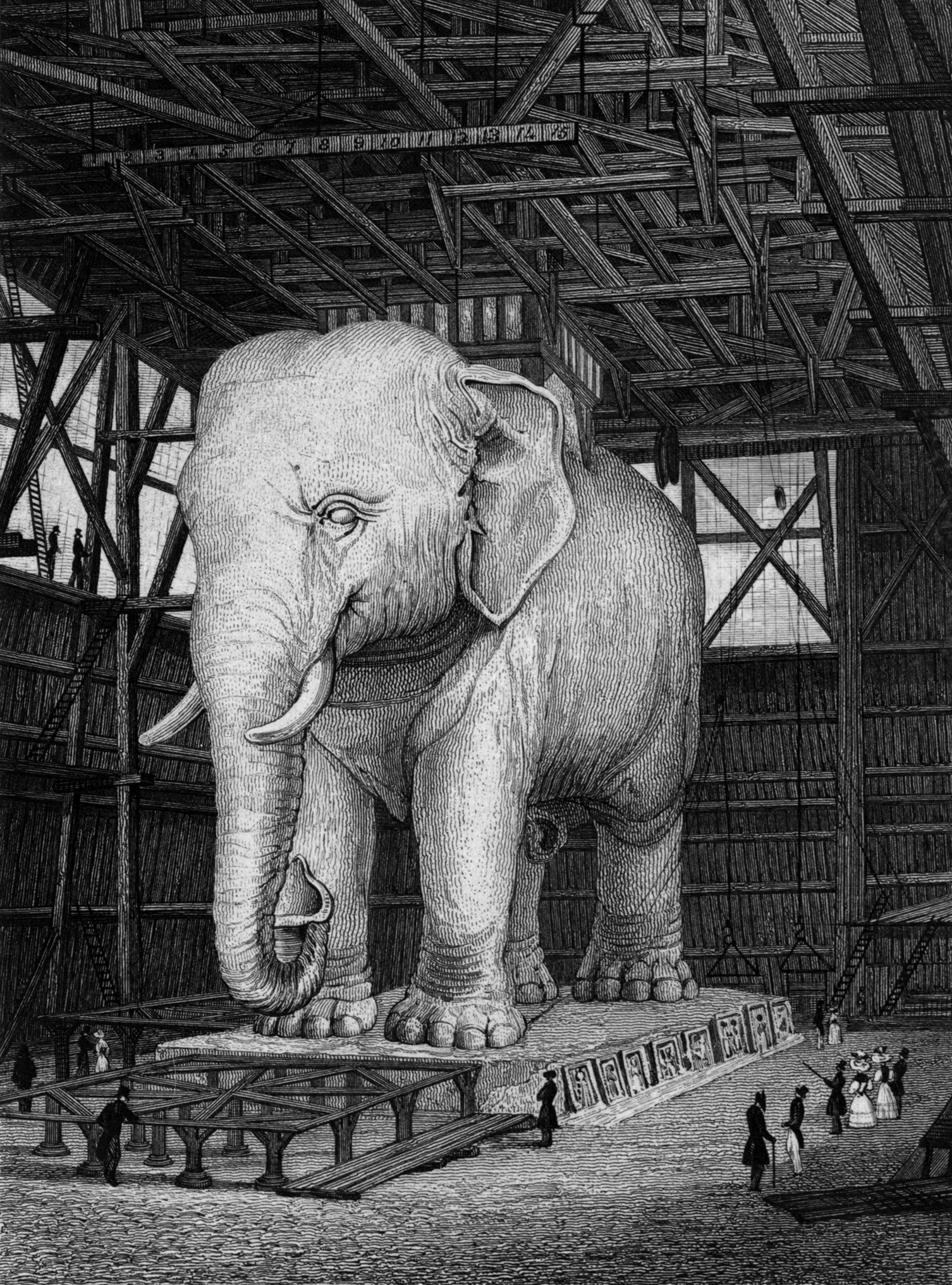
Engraving by Augustus Charles Pugin of Bridan's plaster full-scale model, 1814

Pierre-Charles Bridan (1766–1836) was a French sculptor.

Pierre-Charles Bridan was a pupil of his father, the sculptor Charles-Antoine Bridan. He attended the Académie royale de peinture et de sculpture where he won the Prix de Rome in 1791. Around 1812, he participated in the project to design of the Elephant of the Bastille. Bridan completed the plaster full-scale model of the elephant in 1814.
