= Charles-Antoine Bridan =

French sculptor (1730–1805)

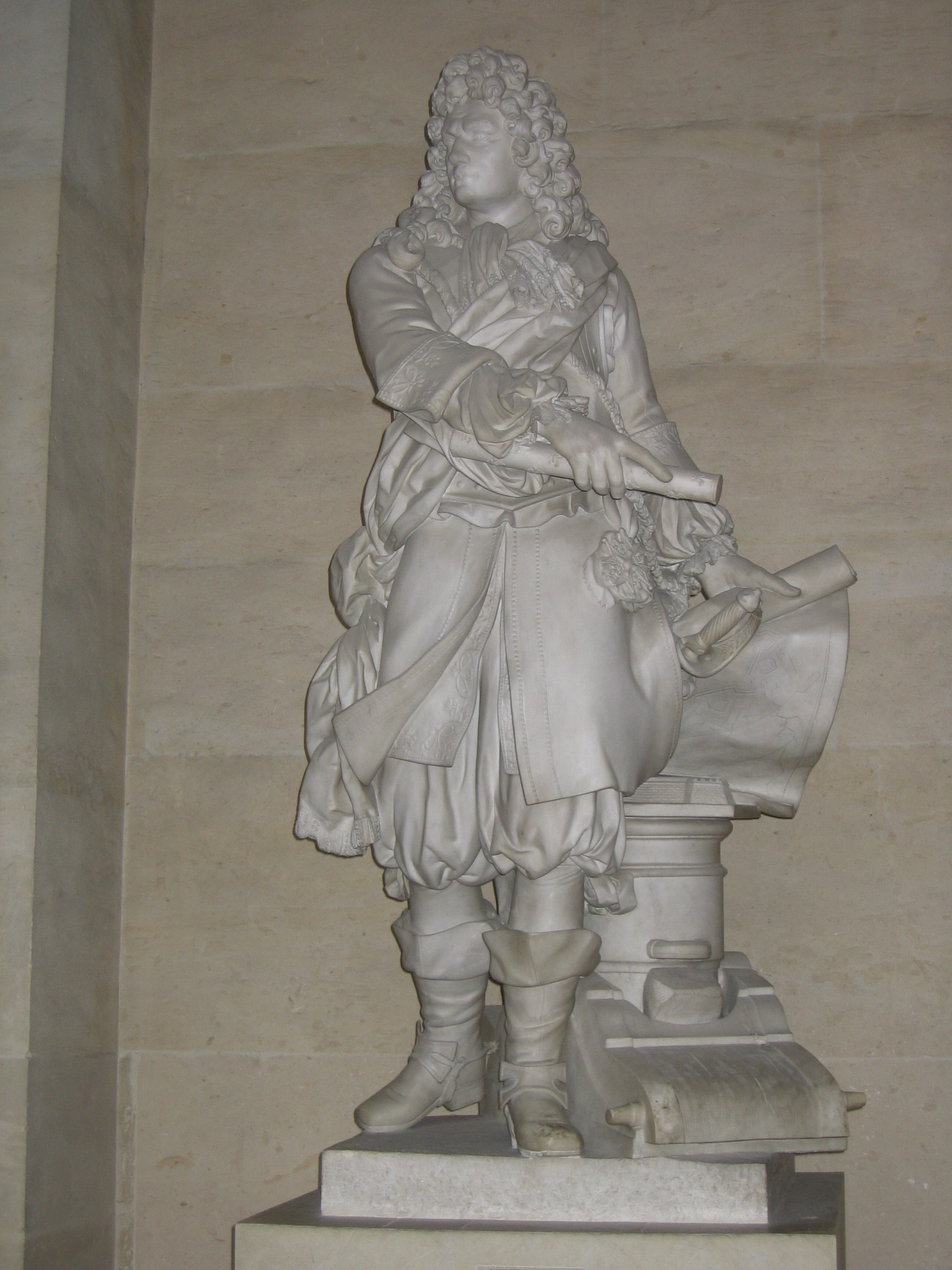
Vauban, Marshal of France by Charles-Antoine Bridan, Palace of Versailles, 1785

Charles-Antoine Bridan (31 July 1730 – 28 April 1805) was a French sculptor.

Bridan was born in Ravières, and initially studied under Jean-Joseph Vinache. He attended the Académie royale de peinture et de sculpture where he won the Prix de Rome in 1754 for his work, Massacre of the Innocents. His award enabled him to travel, whereupon he attended the school at the French Academy in Rome. He remained in Italy until 1762 and then returned to the Académie in Paris. He completed a marble sculpture, The Martyrdom of Saint Bartholomew, in 1772. On 30 December 1780, Bridan was appointed professor of sculpture. He trained his son, Pierre-Charles Bridan, who also became a sculptor.
