= Claude-Louis Masquelier =

French engraver and lithographer

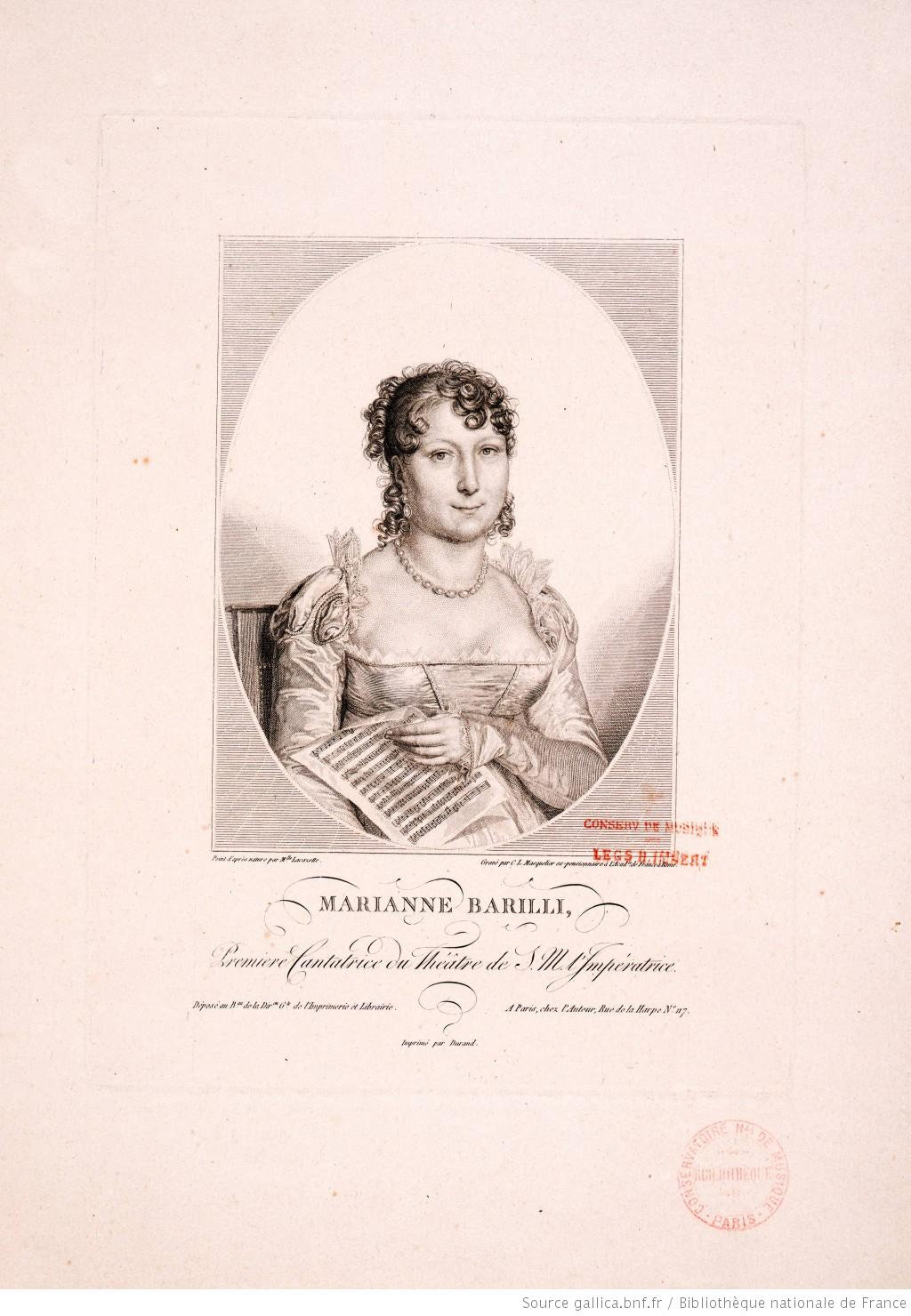
Masquelier's engraving of the singer Marie-Anne Barilli-Bondini, after a drawing by Sophie-Clémence de Lacazette

.

Claude-Louis Masquelier, Masquelier fils or Masquelier the Younger (March 1781 – 5 April 1851) was a French lithographer and engraver. He was born in Paris, where he also died. He studied under his father Louis-Joseph Masquelier.

== Sources ==
- "Masquelier, Claude Louis". MASQUELIER, Claude Louis (1781 - 1852), Engraver : Benezit Dictionary of Artists - oi. Oxford University Press. 31 October 2011. doi:10.1093/benz/9780199773787.article.B00118239.
