= Joseph-Charles Marin =

French sculptor

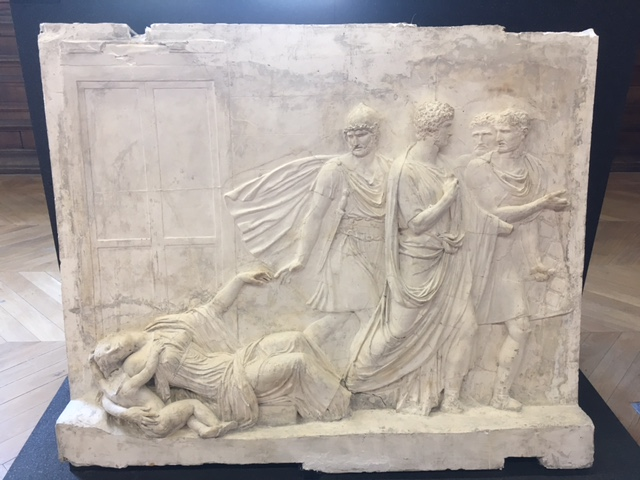
Caius Gracchus leaving his wife Licinia (1801)

Joseph-Charles Marin (1749, in Paris – 18 September 1834, in Paris) was a French sculptor

== Life ==
He was a student of Claude Michel and made several attempts to win the Grand Prix de Sculpture before the French Revolution, only winning it in 1801 with the bas-relief Caius Gracchus leaving his wife Licinia.

Michel was a strong influence on Marin's early style, which was light, elegant and gracious. He later adopted more austere subjects and style closer to the canons of neo-classicism then in force. In 1813 he became a professor at the École nationale supérieure des beaux-arts de Lyon on the death of his former teacher Joseph Chinard, the post's previous holder.

== Bibliography ==
- Patrice Bellanger, Joseph-Charles Marin, Sculpteur, Paris, 1992, Galerie Patrice Bellanger éditeur, (ISBN 2-9506583-0-X), 88 pages. Catalogue of the 1992 exhibition, 27 works.
- Emmanuel Schwartz, Les Sculptures de l'École des Beaux-Arts de Paris. Histoire, doctrines, catalogue, École nationale supérieure des Beaux-Arts, Paris, 2003, p. 141
