= Alfred-Henri Recoura =

French architect

Alfred-Henri Recoura or Alfred Recoura (30 September 1864 in Grenoble – 6 December 1940 in Paris), was a French architect.

He is best known for his work on the Basilica of the Visitation in Annecy.

== Main achievements ==
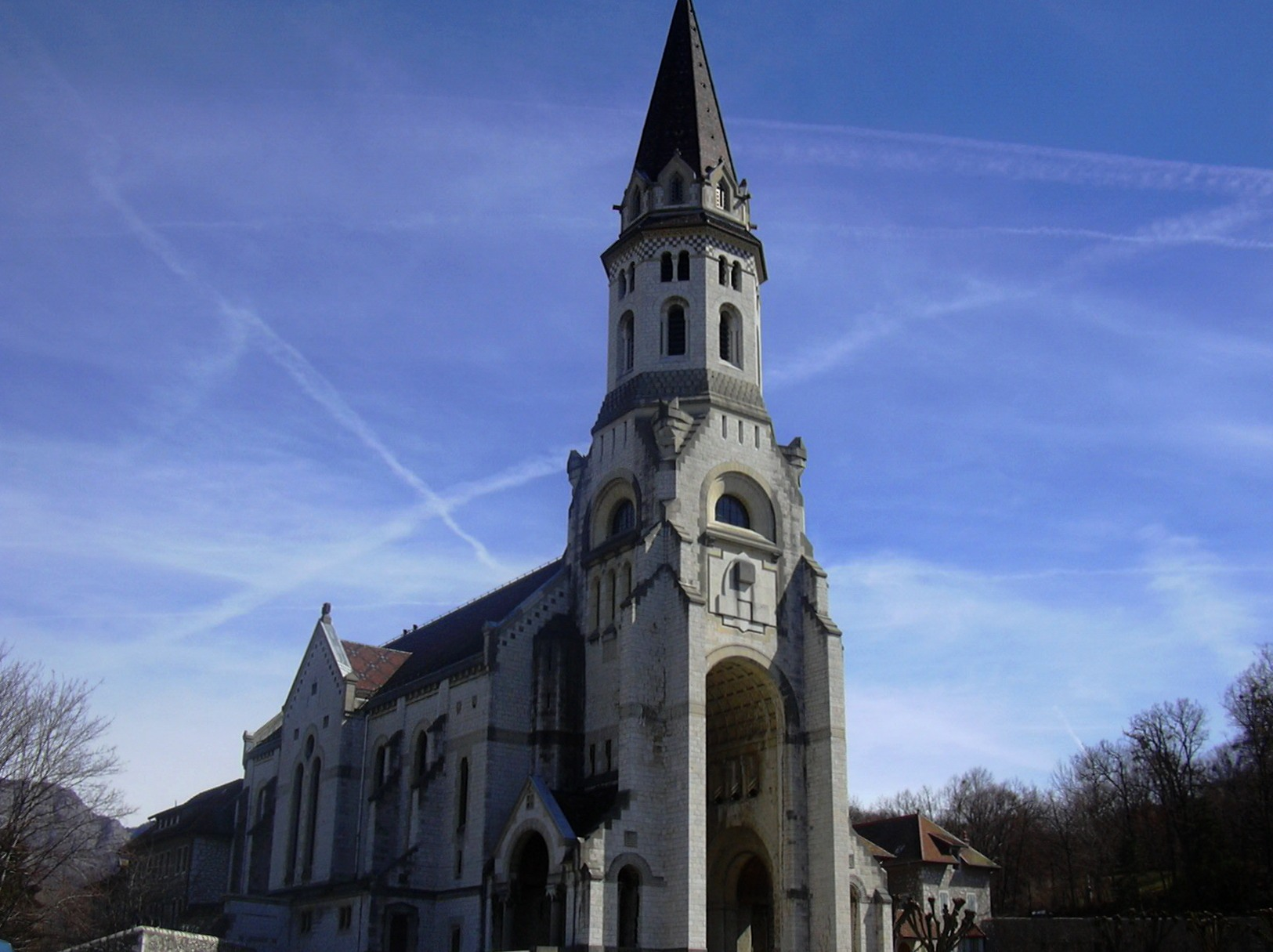
Basilica of the Visitation in Annecy

- 1908: Church of the Holy Spirit of the Gondolas in Choisy-le-Roi
- 1909: Beau-site villa, 19 Raspail avenue, 18 rue Camille-Flammarion in Juvisy-sur-Orge
- 1922-1930: Basilica of the Visitation in Annecy
