= François-Léon Sicard =

French sculptor

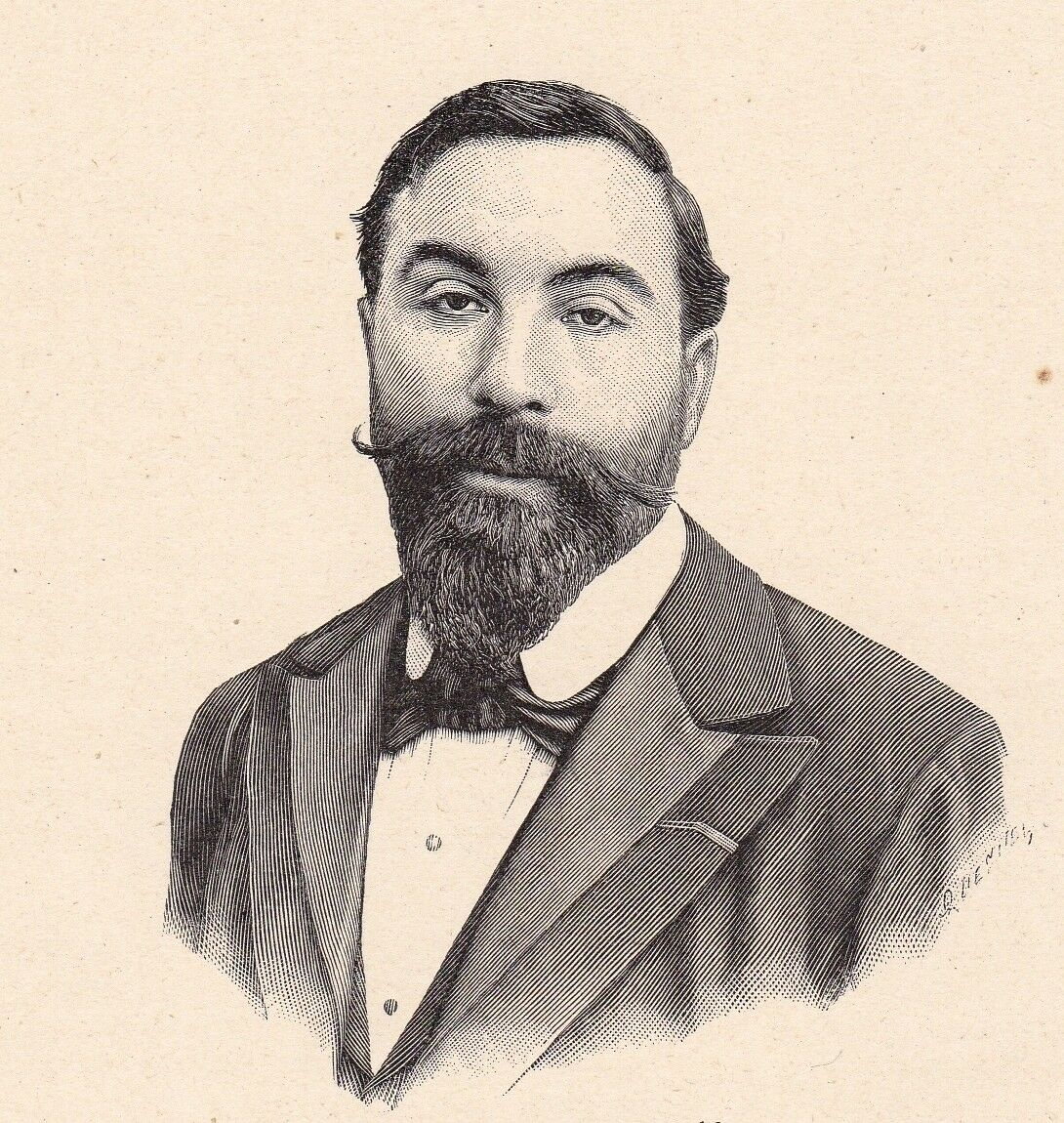
- Born: 21 April 1862; Tours, France
- Died: 8 July 1934 (aged 72); Paris
- Occupations: Sculptor lithography
- Awards: Prix de Rome 1891

François-Léon Sicard (21 April 1862 – 8 July 1934) was a French sculptor in the late 19th and early 20th century. His credits include work on the adornments of the Louvre, and numerous sculptures around the world.

Sicard was born in Tours, studied with Louis-Ernest Barrias, and is known for his lithography and his fiercely patriotic original works of art. Despite the prolific populace of noted works throughout Europe, surprisingly little is known about Sicard himself. His work is very similar to that of Gustave Crauk (1827–1920) and Antoine-Augustin Préault (1809–1879), and he may have worked in collaboration with Crauk on some of his sculptures during the early 20th century.

== Notable works ==
Some of his noted sculptures include:

- Le Bon Samaritain (The Good Samaritan), Grand Carré of the Tuileries, Tuileries Gardens, Paris, 1896
- four atlantes for the Hôtel de Ville, Tours, for architect Victor Laloux, c. 1900
- Autel de la Convention nationale ("Monument to the National Convention") or Autel républicain, Panthéon de Paris, 1913
- the Archibald Fountain in Hyde Park, Sydney, Australia, completed in France 1926, unveiled on site 1932
- work at the Cercle National des Armées, Paris, for architect Charles Lemaresquier, 1927
- Oedipe et le Sphinx (Oedipus and the Sphinx)

== Gallery ==
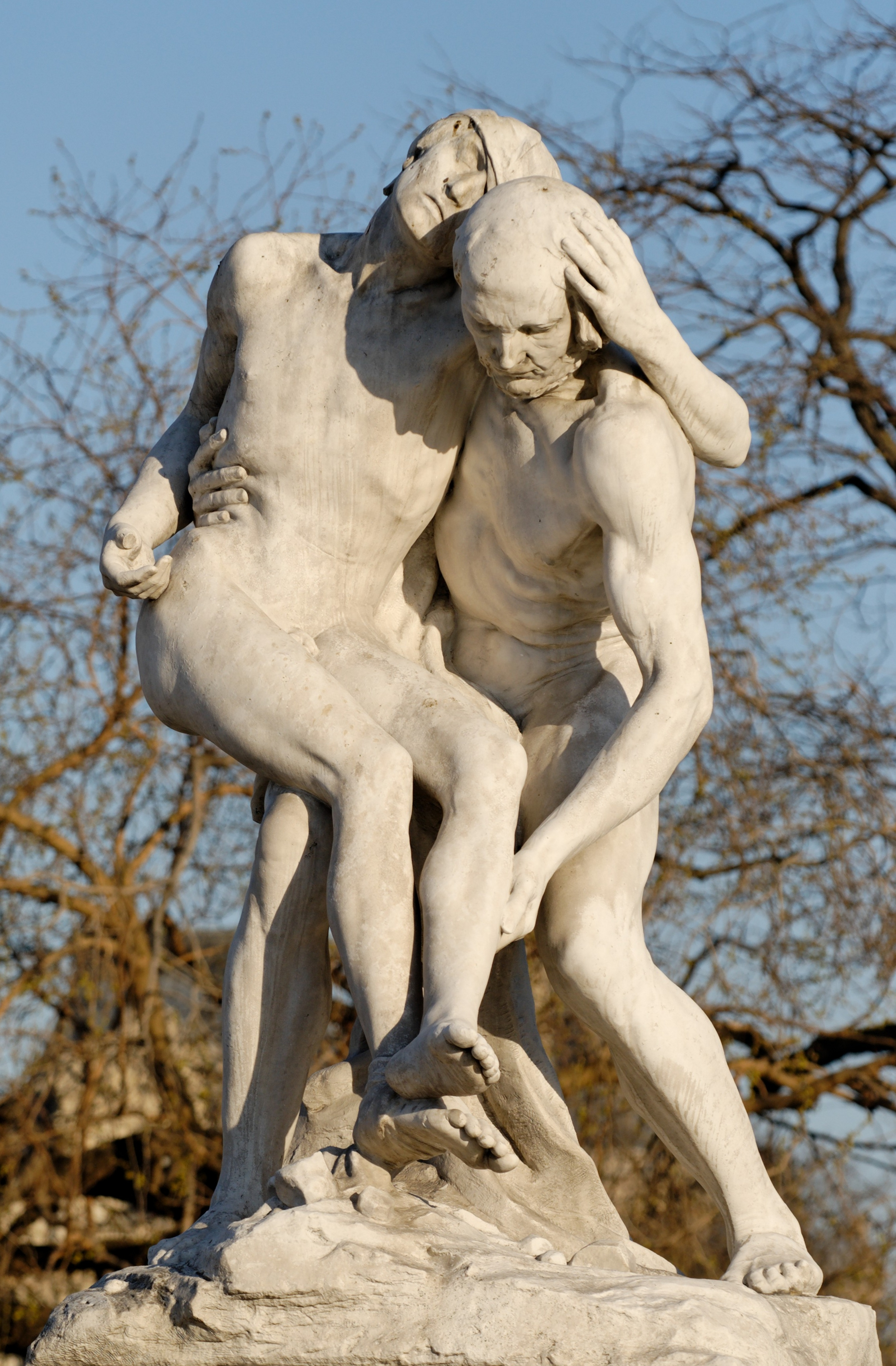
Le Bon Samaritain (1896), jardin des Tuileries, Paris.

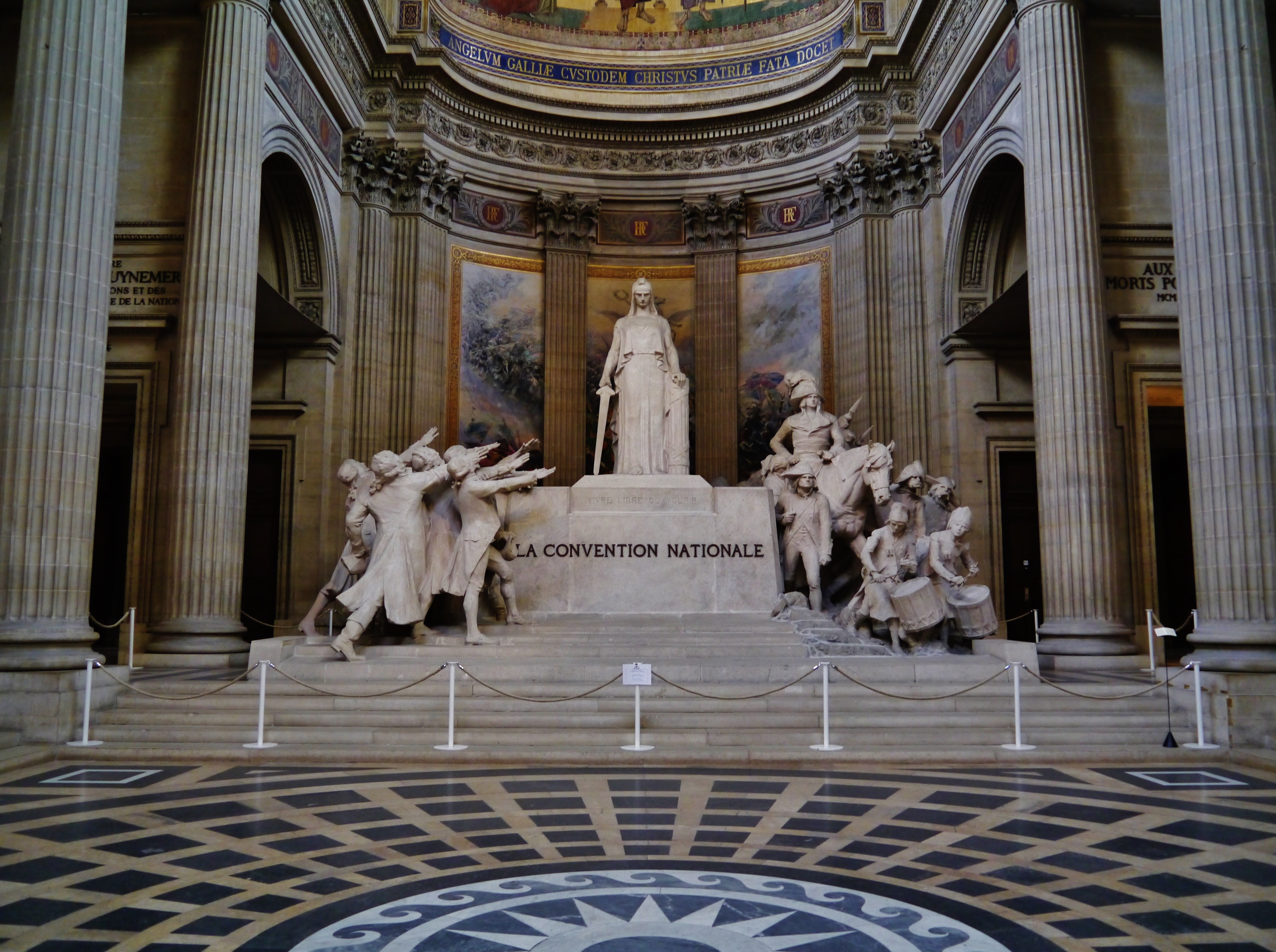
Monument à la Convention nationale (1913), Panthéon de Paris.

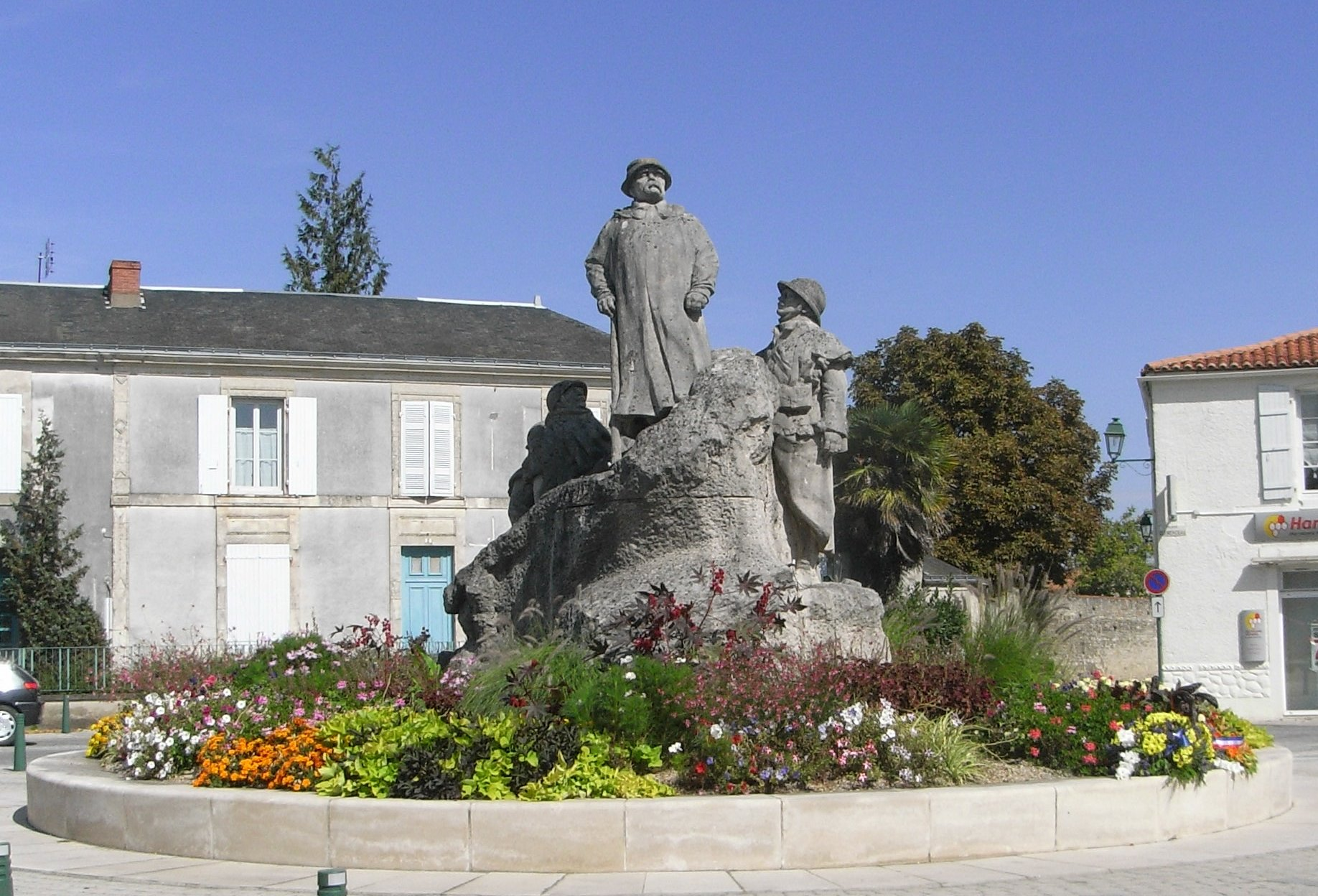
Monument to Georges Clemenceau
