= Hippolyte Lefèbvre =

French sculptor and medallist (1863–1935)

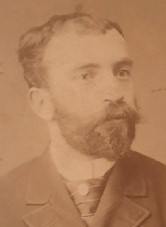
- Born: 4 February 1863
- Died: 22 September 1935; Arcueil
- Education: French Academy in Rome
- Occupations: Sculptor, medalist, visual artist

Signature
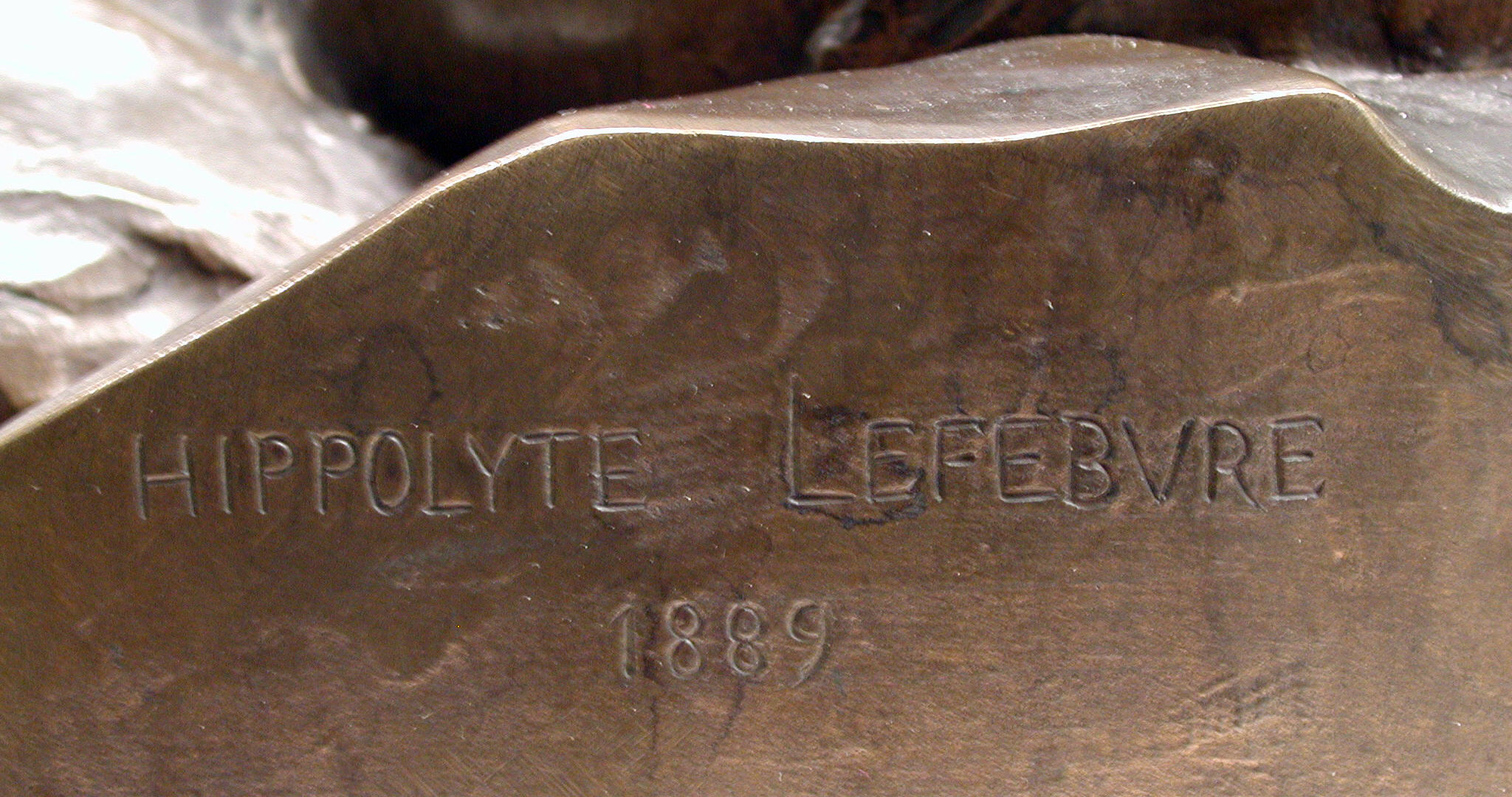

Hippolyte-Jules Lefèbvre (4 February 1863 - November 1935) was a French sculptor and medallist who received numerous official marks of recognition in his day but is now largely forgotten. His most prominent works are the monumental equestrian sculptures of Joan of Arc and Louis IX of France, set up on the Basilique du Sacré Cœur, Paris.

== Biography ==
Lefèbvre was born on 4 February 1863, in Lille. From a working-class background, he made his first studies at the École des Beaux-Arts, Lille, where he won numerous prizes and was sent with a municipal scholarship to study at the École des beaux-arts, Paris. In 1882 he moved to Paris, where he was a pupil of Pierre-Jules Cavelier, Louis-Ernest Barrias and Jules Coutan. He began exhibiting regularly at the Salon des Artistes Français from 1887, and in 1892, after receiving seconds in 1888 and 1891, won the Grand Prix de Rome in sculpture; on his return to Paris he pursued a successful official career. He was made a chevalier of the Legion of Honour, and an officer in 1925.

Aside from Sacré-Coeur, where he also provided sculpture for the high altar, his public sculpture is to be seen also at the Grand Palais, Paris, where he received a gold medal at the Exposition Universelle (1900). His kneeling funeral figure of Léon-Adolphe Cardinal Amette, 1923, is in the Chapel of Saint-Vincent-de-Paul, Notre-Dame de Paris. He was called upon to provide sculpture for a number of monuments to the fallen of World War I. His Jeunes Aveugles (1902) won a medal of honor and was purchased for the collections at the Palais du Luxembourg, Paris.

His work may also be found on the Opéra de Lille, 1914; the Allegory of the Republic in the cour d'honneur of the French embassy in Vienna (built 1904); a marble Niobe at the Tour de Roland, Arles; and at the Hôtel de Ville, Roubaix.

Lefebvre was often called upon to make commemorative medals, such as one celebrating the centenary of Argentine independence, 1910; one commemorating Jules Gosset, for the Société des Sciences, Lille; one that the architect Louis M. Cordonnier, member of the Institut de France, distributed to friends and colleagues, 26 January 1912; Fondation Firmin Rainbeaux, 1930.

His workshop drawings and jottings, unlike his finished sculpture, approached abstraction.

Lefèbvre died in November 1935, in Arcueil.

== Legacy ==
A street commemorates him in Lille and a quai in Mondeville.

== Gallery ==
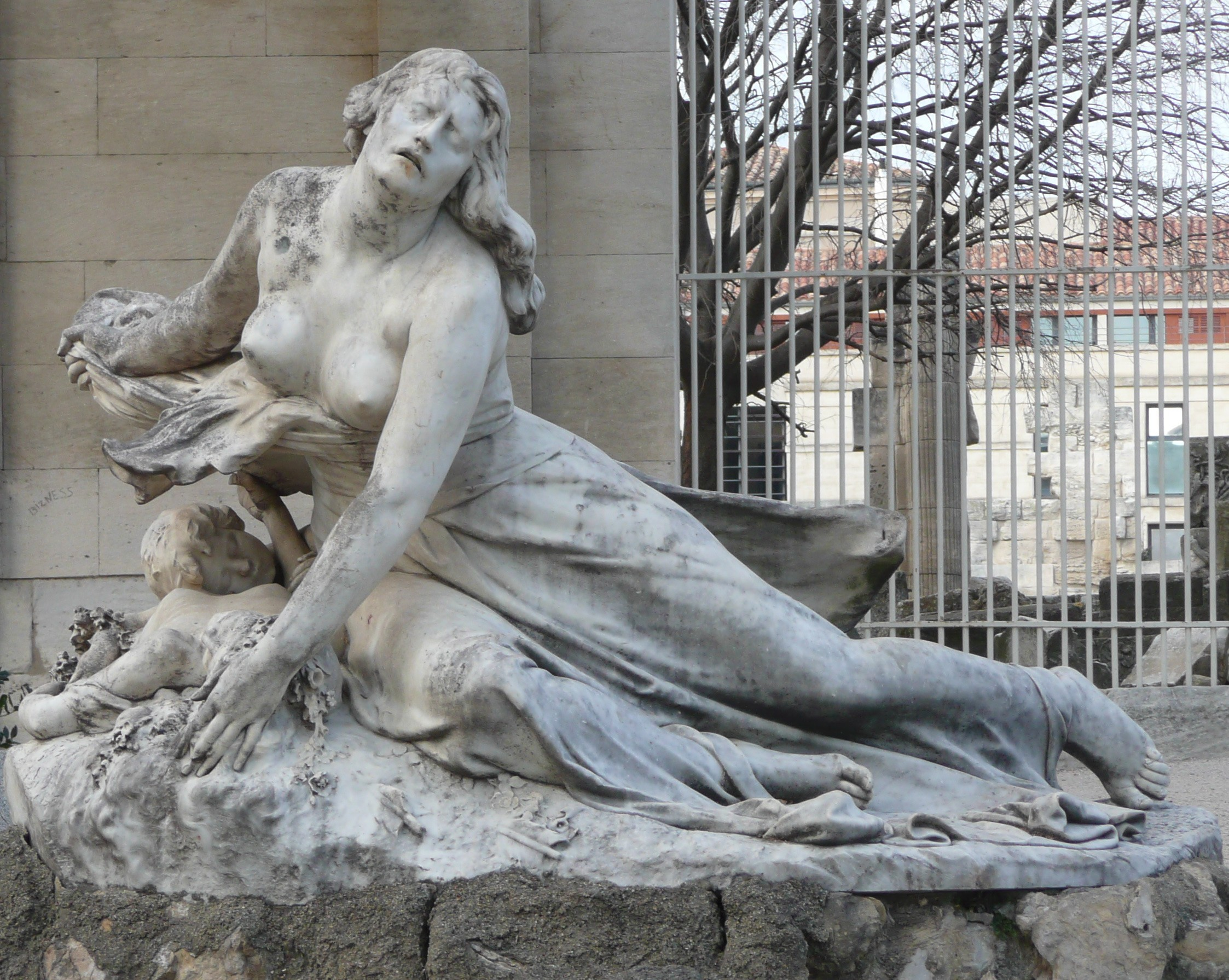
Niobe (1897), Garden of Summer, Arles

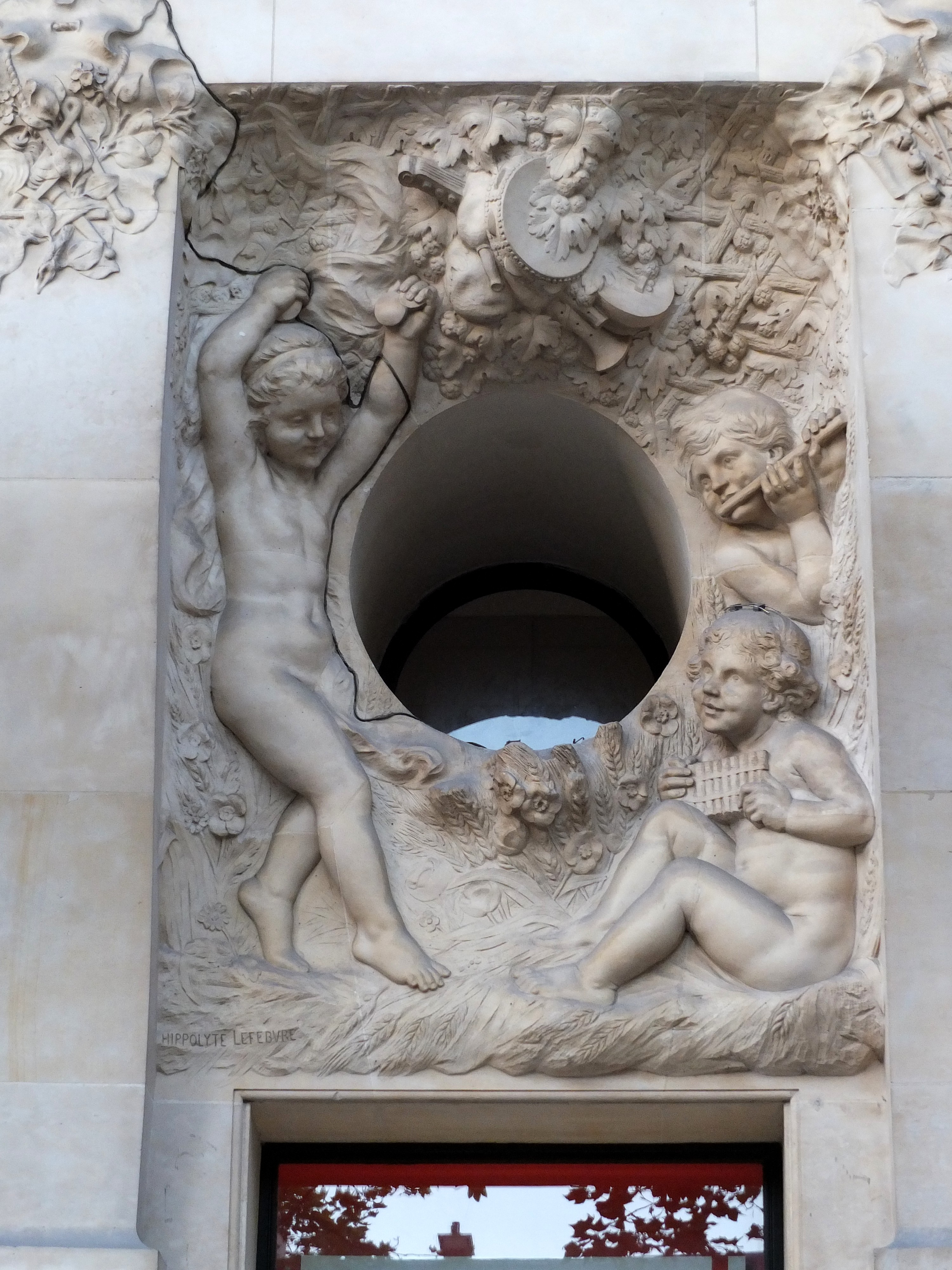
La Danse (1898), facade of the Hôtel Élysée Palace, Paris, Champs-Élysées

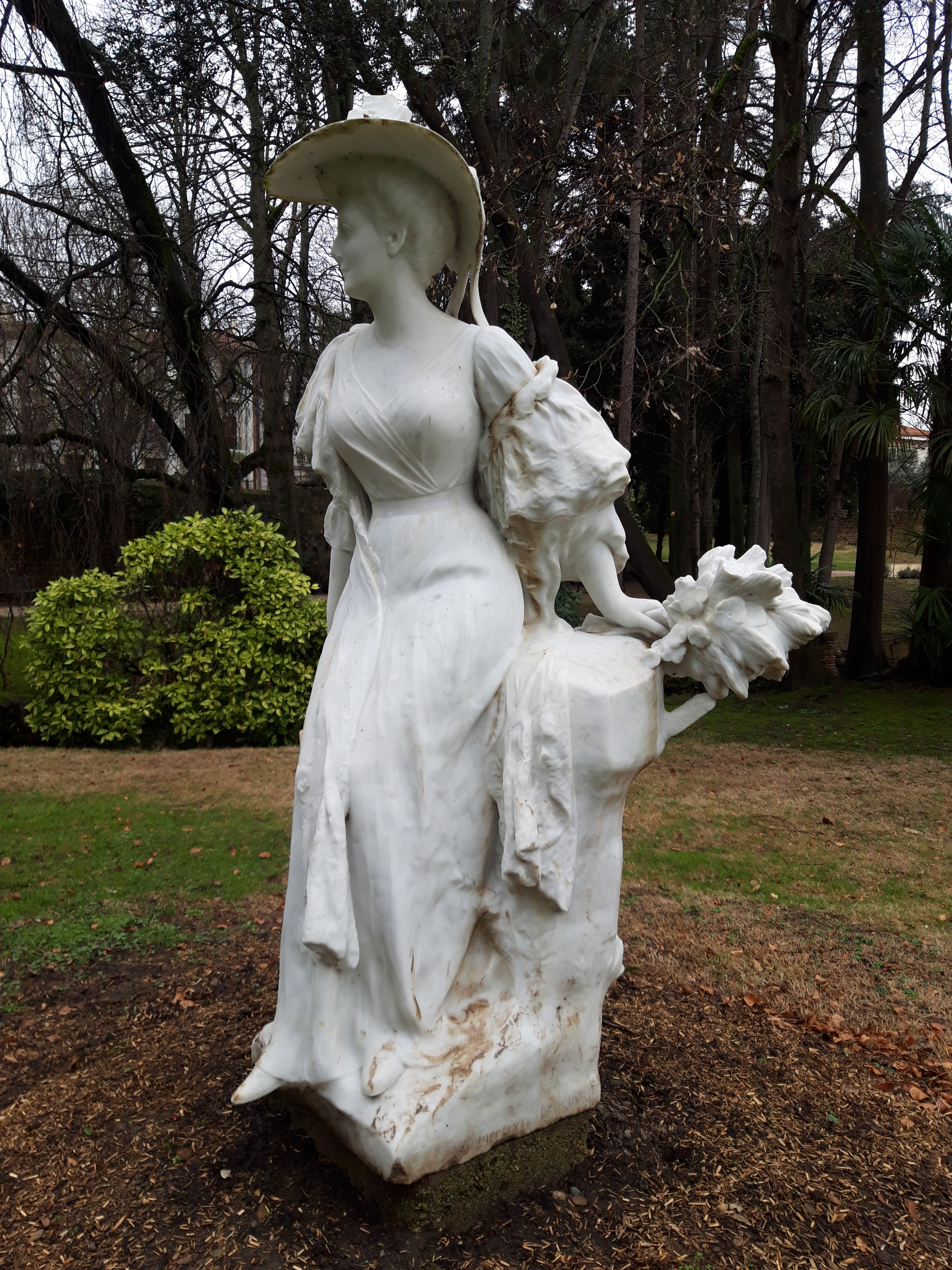
The Elegant Lady with the Umbrella (1905), Pamiers

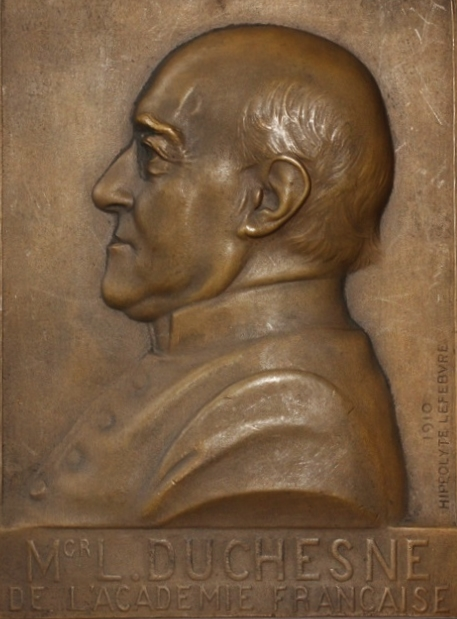
medallion of Louis Duchesne (1910), plaque

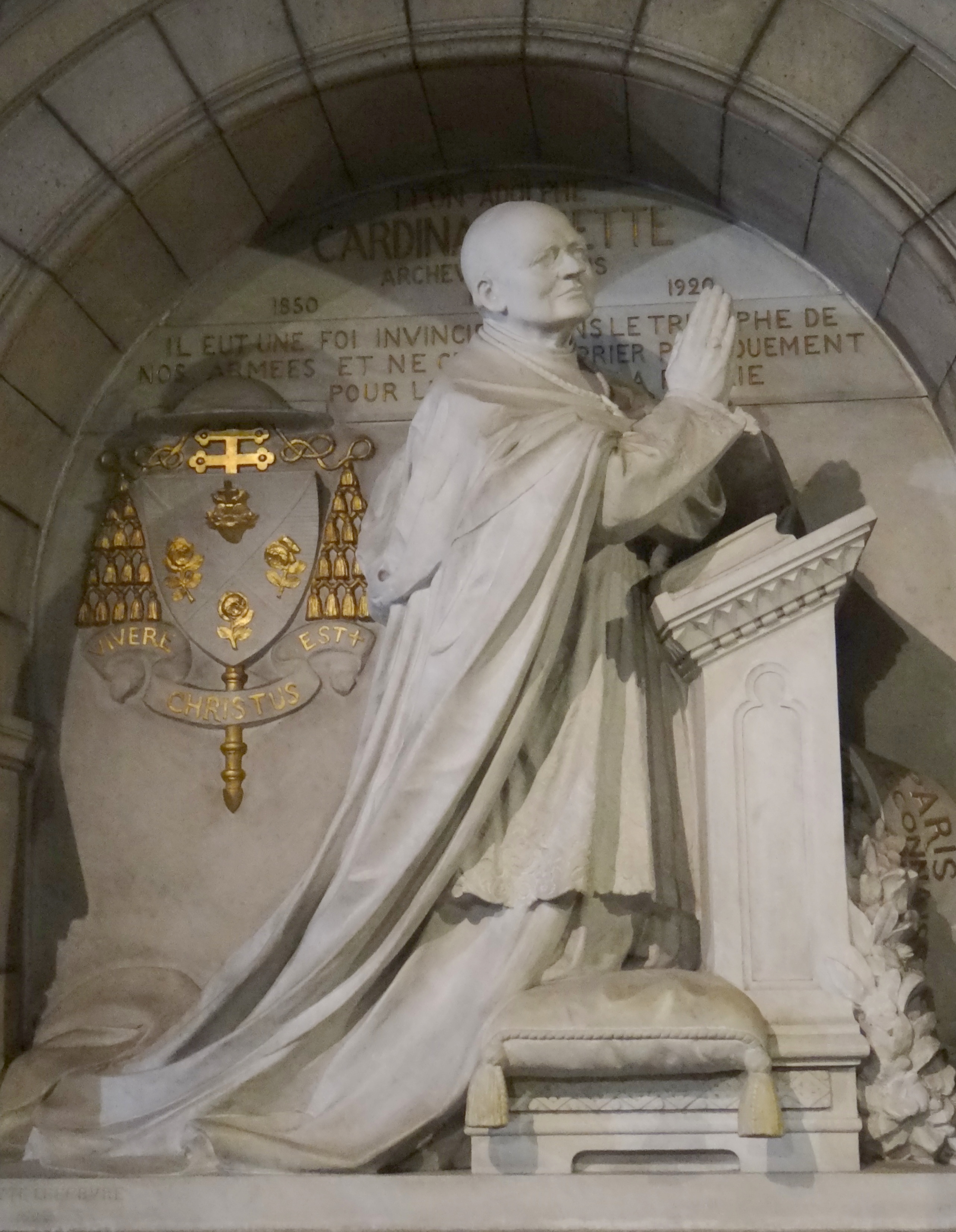
Funeral monument for Léon-Adolphe Amette (1923), Paris, crypt of the Basilica of Sacré-Cœur de Montmartre.

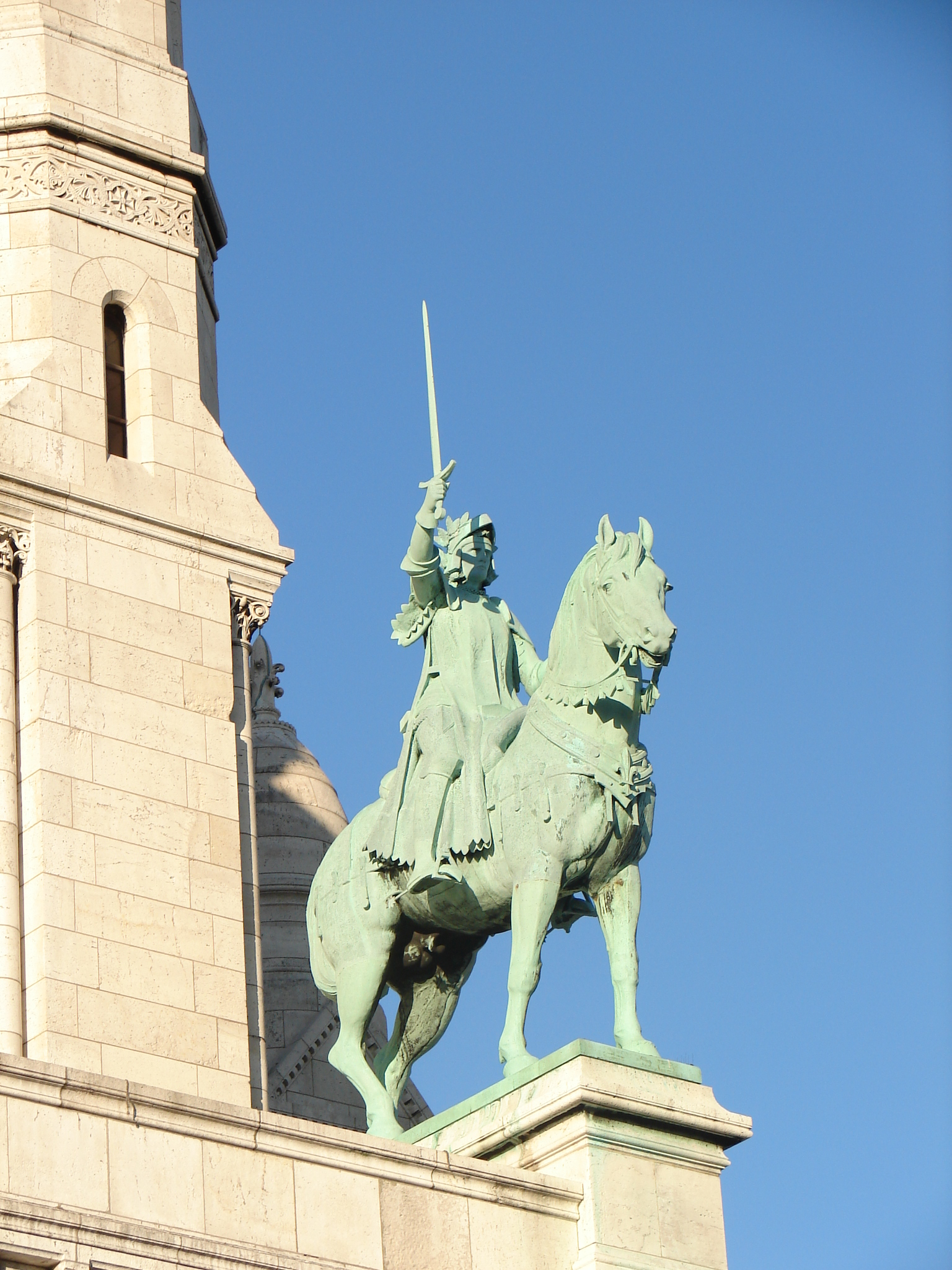
Equestrian statue of Joan of Arc (Basilica of Sacré-Cœur) (1927), Paris, Basilica of Sacré-Cœur de Montmartre

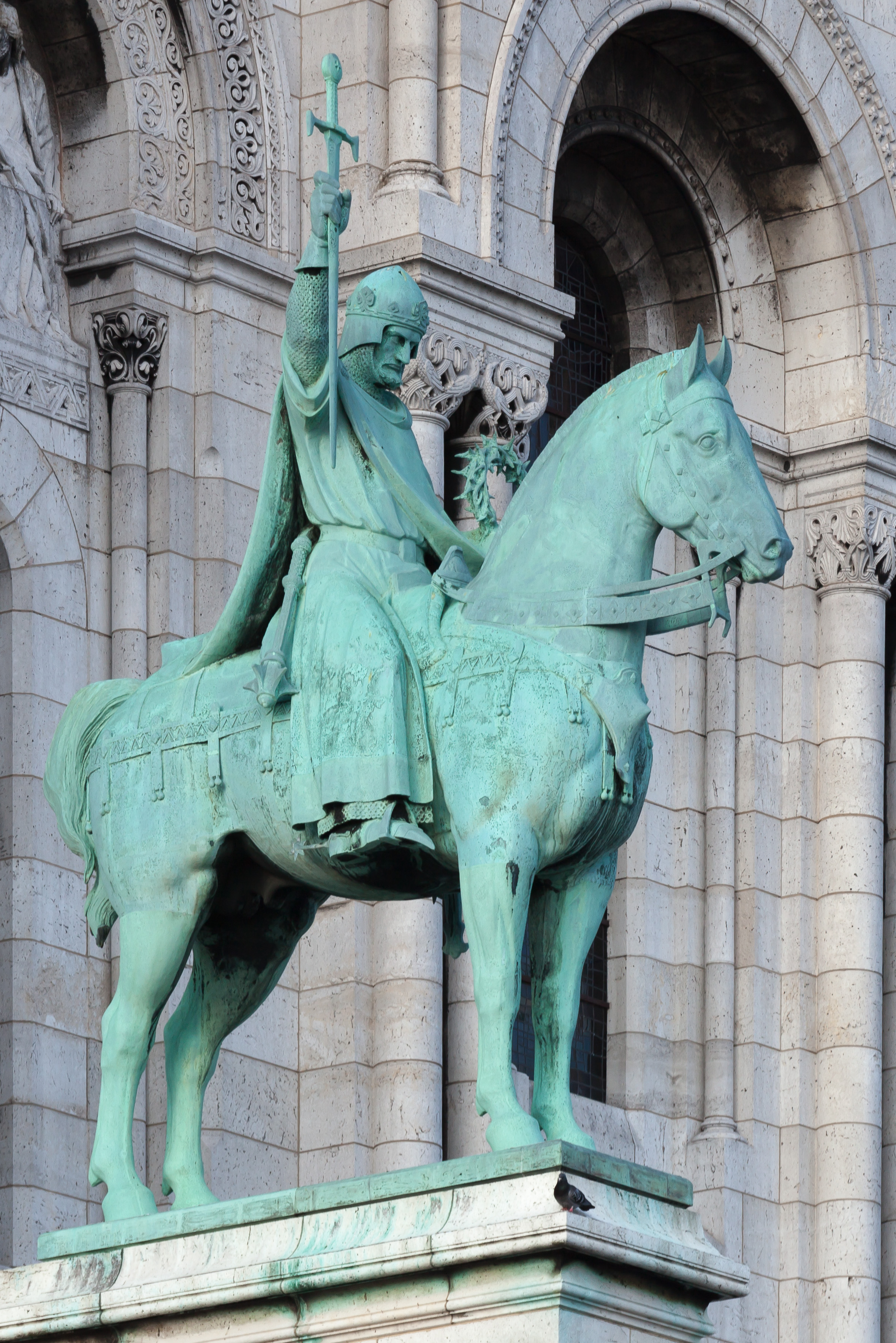
Equestrian Statue of Louis IX, (1827), 18th arrondissement of Paris

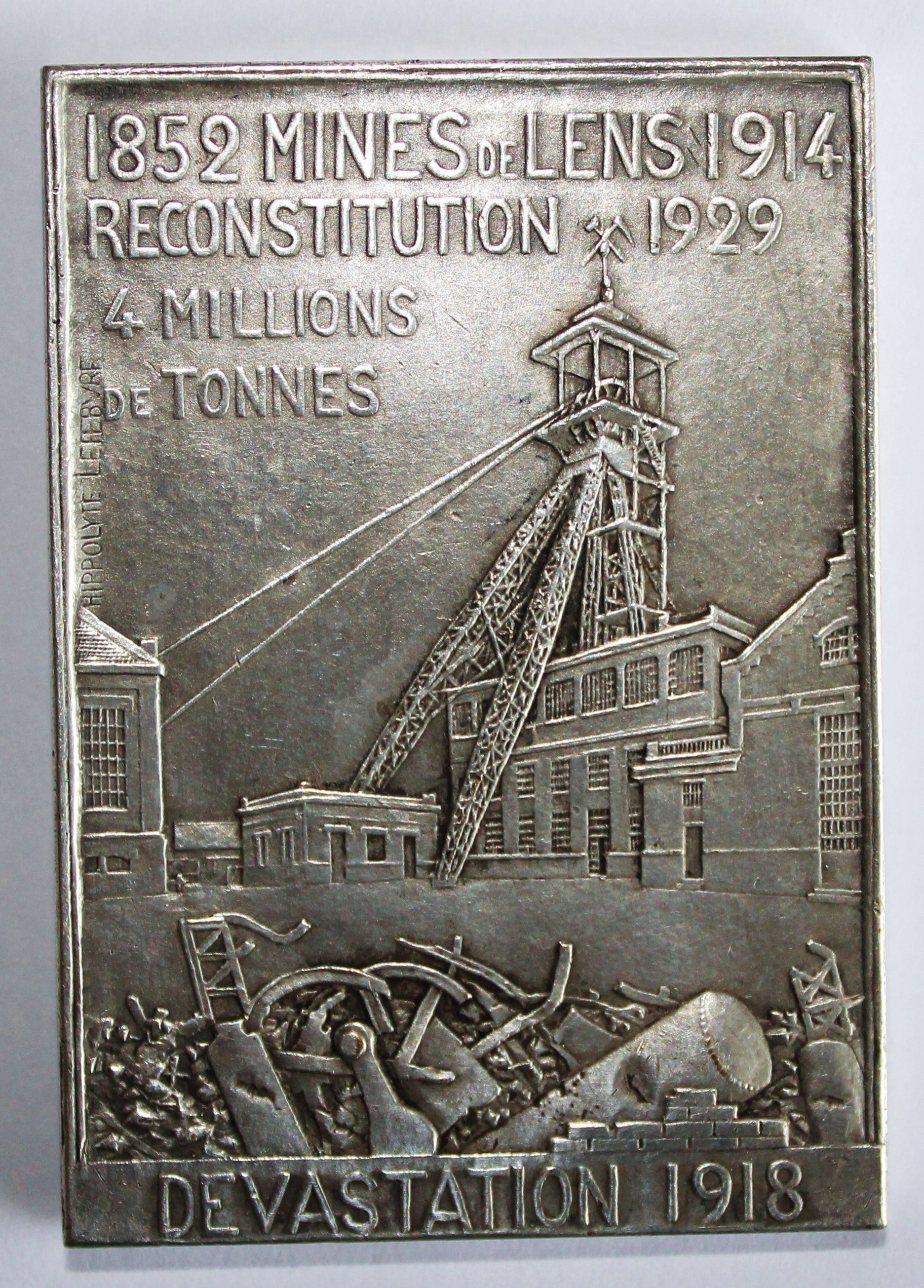
medal for the Lens Mining Company (1929)
