= Alphonse-Amédée Cordonnier =

French sculptor

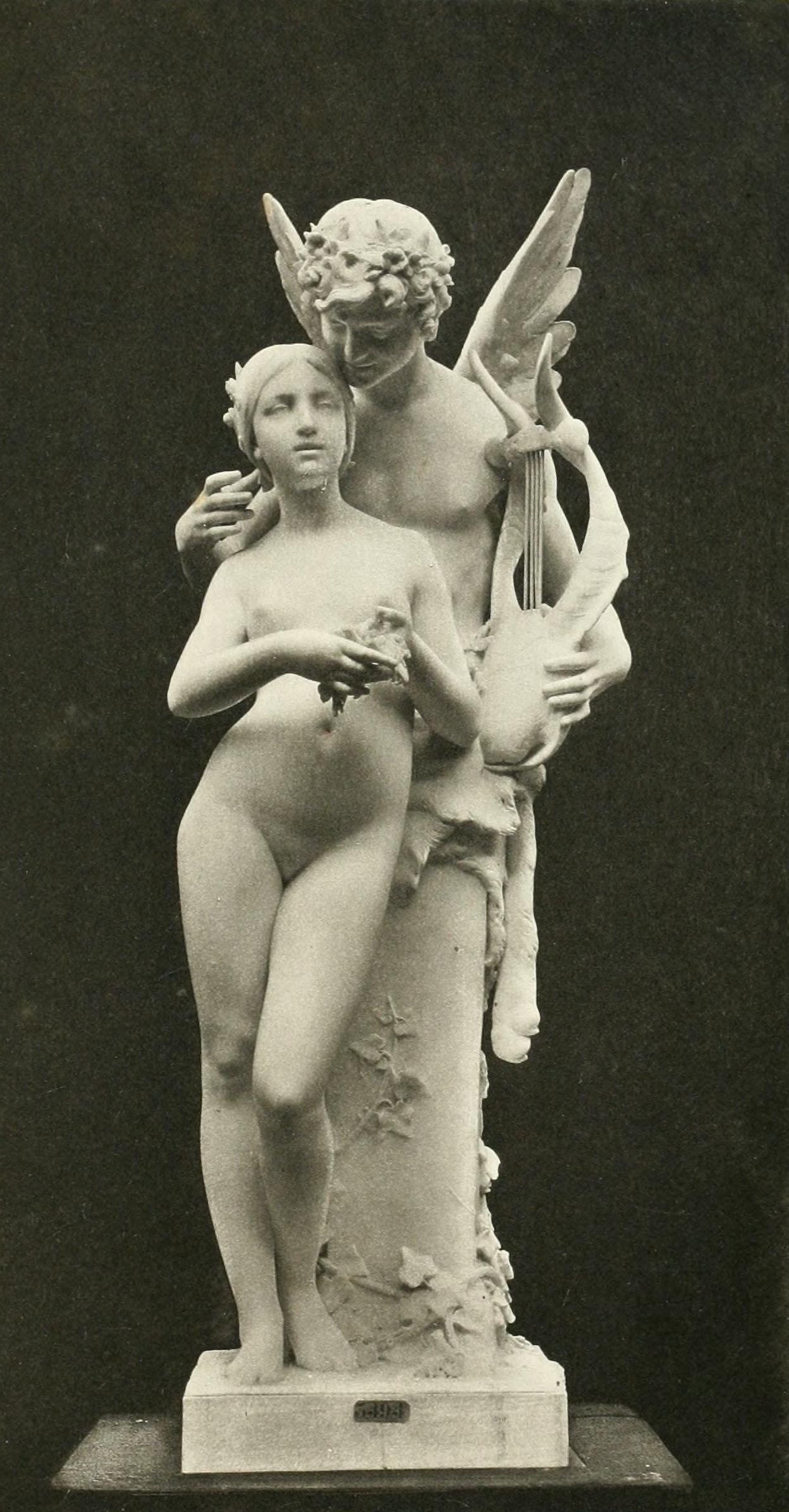
Printemps

Alphonse-Amédée Cordonnier (1848–1930) was a French sculptor.

Born in La Madeleine, Nord, Cordonnier was educated in nearby Lille, then in Paris, then in Rome, on a scholarship funded by the foundation of Jean-Baptiste Wicar. Cordonnier won the Prix de Rome for sculpture in 1877. He was appointed a chevalier of the Legion d'honneur in 1888, and an officier in 1903.

Combined with his realistic style, many of Coronnier's themes are progressive and socially minded, for example his Les Miséreux (the Destitute), Les Pauvres gens (the Poor), and L'inoculation et la fermentation (Inoculation and Fermentation), all to be seen at the Palais des Beaux-Arts de Lille.

== Work ==
- Printemps (Spring), 1883
- Maternity, now in the Place Adolphe-Chérioux, 15th arrondissement of Paris, 1899
- allegorical facade figures of Education and Vigilance for the Hôtel de Ville, Tours, circa 1900, for architect Victor Laloux
- allegorical figure of Sculpture (1900), facade of the Grand Palais, Paris
- The Sower, now at La Piscine Museum, Roubaix, 1907
- figures representing cotton-gathering and sheep-shearing, Hôtel de Ville, Roubaix, 1911, for architect Victor Laloux
- the figure of Music, holding a lyre, for the facade of the Opéra de Lille, completed 1914, inaugurated 1923, for architect Louis M. Cordonnier
- Monument to Louis Pasteur, in Lille
- Jeanne d'Arc, Palais des Beaux-Arts de Lille
