= Opéra de Lille =

Opera house in Lille, France

Coordinates: 50°38′15″N 3°03′55″E

Opéra de Lille

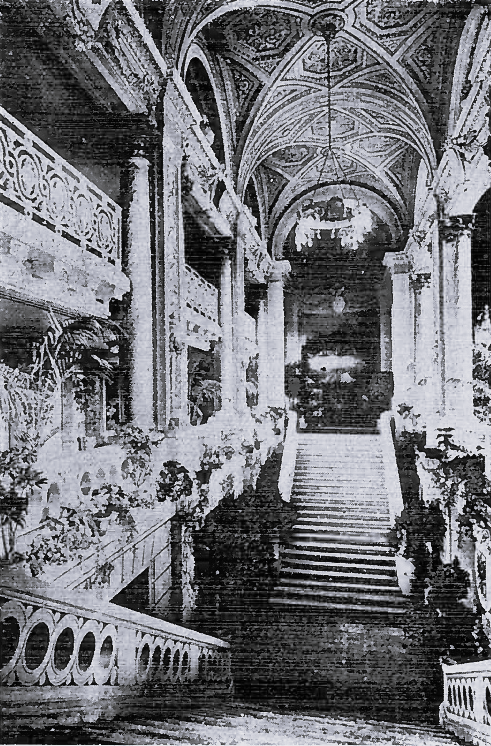
Inside the opera house

The Opéra de Lille is a neo-classical opera house, built from 1907 to 1913 and officially inaugurated in 1923. Closed for renovation in 1998, it reopened in 2004 for Lille 2004. The Opéra de Lille is a member of the European Network for Opera, Music and Dance Education (RESEO), and of Opera Europa. It is served by the metro stations Gare Lille-Flandres and Rihour.

== History ==
Lille became French in 1668 through the Aix-la-Chapelle treaty. The classical singing activity grew quickly. Shows are organised in the city hall by the composer Pascal Collasse. In 1700, the opera room was destroyed and rebuilt thanks to a gift of 90,000 florins by Louis XIV.

In 1787, the city of Lille opened the Théâtre Lequeux, named after Michel-Joseph Lequeux--the local architect who designed it. In 1903, a fire destroyed the original Lille opera house, building an interim replacement called the Théâtre Sébastopol. For the replacement, city officials chose architect Louis Marie Cordonnier by competition. Cordonnier's Belle Époque design features an elaborate pediment relief by sculptor Hippolyte Lefèbvre, and two flanking bas-relief panels Alphonse-Amédée Cordonnier and Hector Lemaire. The interior includes sculptures by Edgar-Henri Boutry, and frescoes by Georges Picard.

In July 1914, while not quite completed, the Germans occupied the city during World War I and commandeered much of the furniture and equipment of the Opéra to furnish the other opera in Lille, the Theatre Sebastopol. After four years of occupation and damage incrred by the German Army, the building was restored and reopened its doors in 1923 for a rededication as the Grand Theatre and a "première française".

At the end of 1970's the classical singing activity struggles. To relaunch it, an association is created in 1979 with Roubaix's ballet and Tourcoing's opera studio. It creates the "Opéra du Nord" directed by Elie Delfosse. It is opened with Il Trovatore by Verdi for the 1979–1980 season. This new opera is a success, the number of subscribers jumped from 700 to 3000 within three years. However, from the beginning financial problems jeopardise its existence. In 1984 a restructuring fires a part of the employees. The association is dissolved in 1985 because of financial problems and political discord.

The Opera de Lille is then directed by Humbert Camerlo who started an ambitious programmation with among others: Mozart's Cosi van Tutti, Stravinsky's The Rake's Progress.

In 1987, the opera is closed for financial reasons, the orchestra and the chorus are fired.

In 1998, the theatre's physical condition required an emergency closure, in mid-season. Renovations evolved into a more ambitious project to improve the building's functional capabilities for the public and for performing artists. This project was complete in time for Lille's year as European Capital of Culture in 2004.

== See also ==
- Le Concert d'Astrée
