= Hôtel de Ville, Tours =

Town hall of Tours, France

Hôtel de Ville
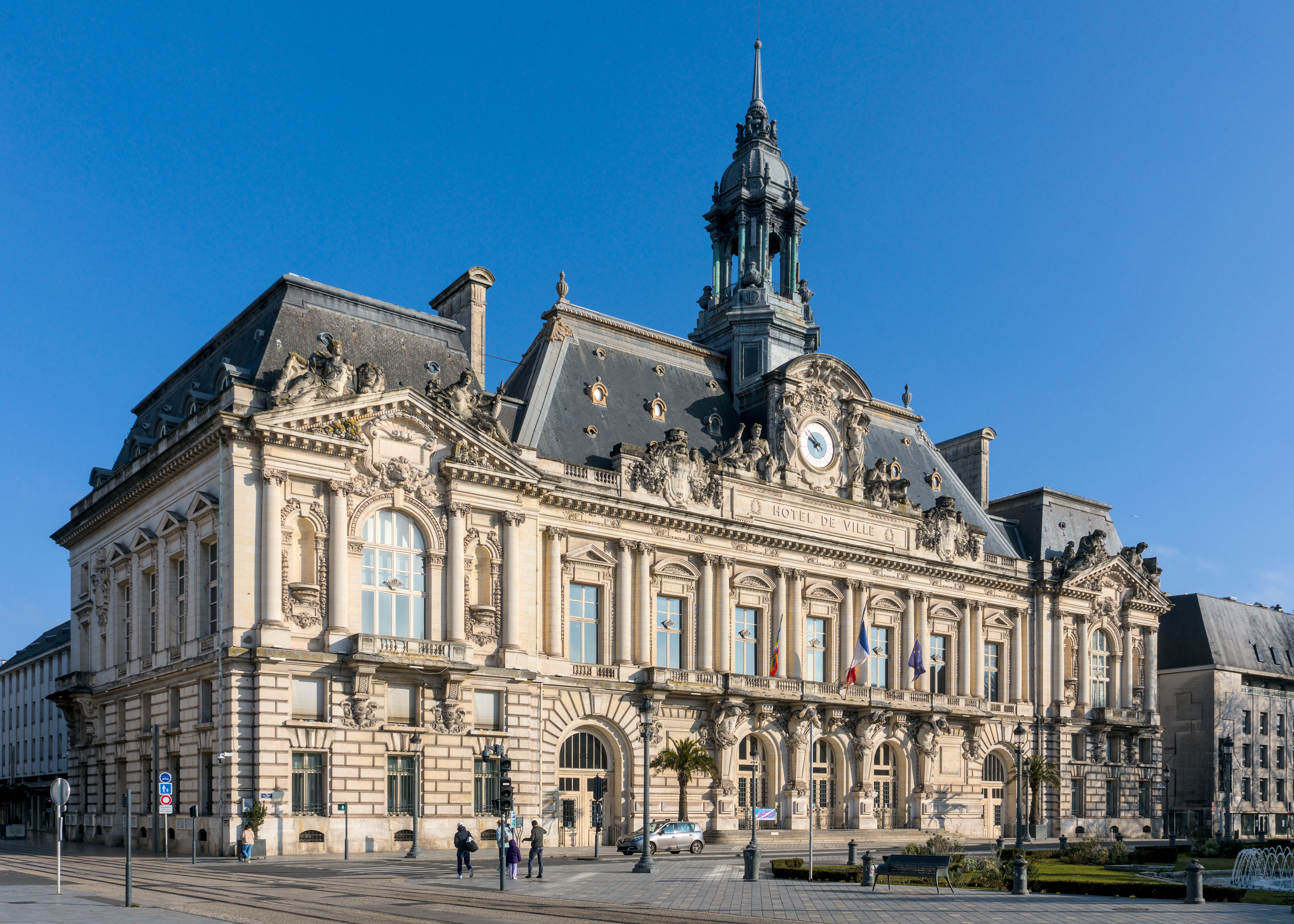
- Main facade, Hôtel de Ville

General information
- Type: City hall
- Architectural style: Renaissance Revival style
- Location: 1–3, rue des Minimes, 37000 Tours, France
- Coordinates: 47.39065°N 0.68934°E
- Groundbreaking: 1896
- Completed: 1904

Design and construction
- Architect: Victor Laloux

Monument historique
- Official name: Hôtel de ville
- Type: Inscrit
- Designated: 1975
- Reference no.: PA00098190

The Hôtel de Ville (French pronunciation: [otɛl də vil], City Hall) in Tours, France houses the city's offices. The building, ornate inside and out, was designed by Tours native architect Victor Laloux and completed in 1904. It was designated a monument historique by the French government in 1975.

== History ==
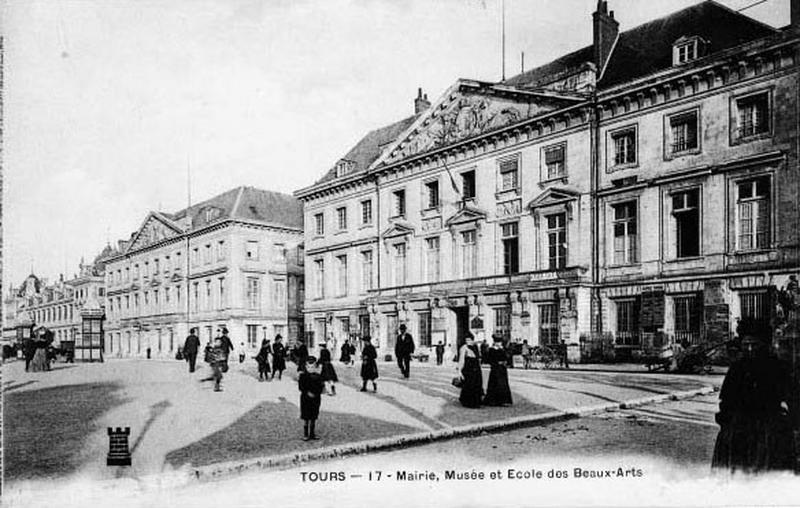
Old city hall, right, c. 1905

The previous Tours city hall was a four-story neo-classical building at Place Anatole-France and Rue Nationale, one of twin buildings at the landing of the town's Pont Wilson stone bridge. It served as city hall from 1786 to 1904. (Note: The old building became the home of the Bibliothèque Municipale de Tours. On 19 June 1940, a few days before the fall of Paris, a major fire caused by German artillery from across the Loire burned the old building to its shell, along with much of the city's historical collections. The remaining structure was demolished the following November, leaving only a single lintel, with "Hôtel de ville" carved on one side, and "Bibliothèque" on the other.)

In the late 19th century, the council decided to commission a more substantial building. Construction of the new building began in 1896. It was designed by Victor Laloux in the Renaissance Revival style, built in ashlar stone and was completed in 1904.

== Architecture ==
=== Exterior ===
The main structure, facing the small semicircular green space of the Place Jean-Jaurès, was designed by Victor Laloux. Laloux, a native of the city and an accomplished professor based in Paris, also designed the city's Basilica of Saint Martin, Tours, which was begun in 1886 and completed in 1925; and the passenger building of the Tours station, completed between 1896 and 1898.

The city hall facade is 225 feet (69 m) long and bears stylistic similarities to the Palazzo della Gran Guardia, in Verona, Italy, and the Palazzo Vidoni-Caffarelli in Rome, built in the 1500s. One reviewer pointed out that the classical details were larger and placed more conspicuously, relative to the work of other modern (1910) French masters, with results that reflected the architect's individuality. "Care for the ornamental mass has been consistently kept superior to the delicate carving, resulting in an extraordinary brilliancy of classical decoration."

Along with two large carved crests, figural sculpture forms a horizontal visual band at the base of the roof, contributed by a team of sculptors. The two caryatids flanking the clock are Day and Night, sculpted by Emile Joseph Nestor Carlier (1849–1927). At the base of the campanile are two lounging male figures representing the Loire and the Cher rivers, by Jean Antoine Injalbert. Four herms support the central balcony, sculpted by François-Léon Sicard. The two side pavilions each carry two more allegorical figures on the sloping tops of open-bed pediments, Education and Vigilance, by Alphonse-Amédée Cordonnier, and Strength and Glory by Jean-Baptiste Hugues.

Much of the minor carving here, as with the Tours train station, came from the decorative studios of Henri Varenne, Laloux's frequent collaborator and fellow Tourangeau.

=== Interior ===
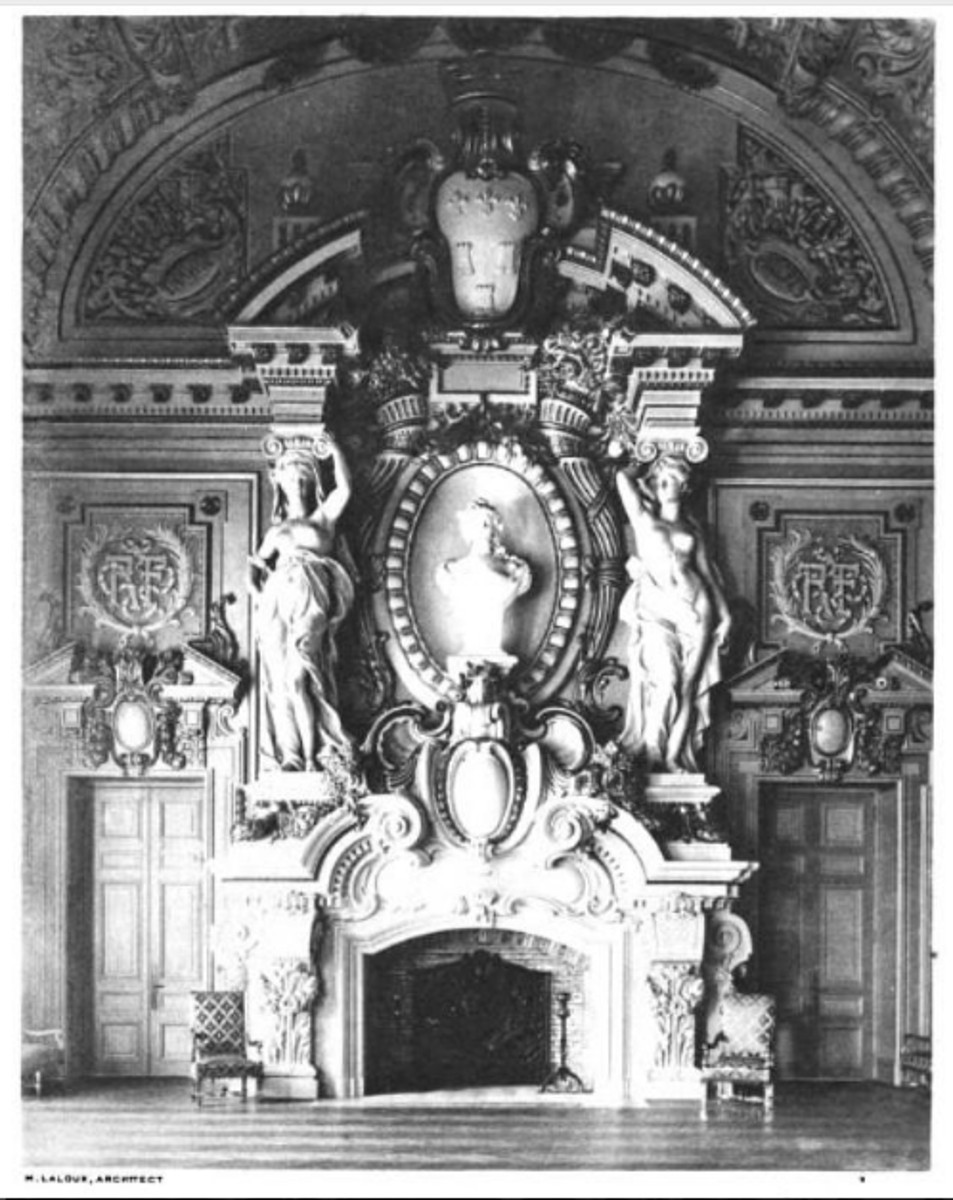
Mantel with caryatids, Salle des Fetes

The plan accommodates large meeting rooms and halls on the ground floor, for French civil marriage ceremonies and meetings of the city council, and are as abundantly decorated as the exterior. The Salle des Fetes features further sculptural work by Injalbert, a figure of the Republic, and a companion figure La Touraine by Loiseau-Bailly. Two caryatids on the mantel are credited to Henri Varenne.

The municipal council chamber is decorated with a triptych showing three episodes in the life of Joan of Arc, by Jean-Paul Laurens (1901–1903).
