= Georges Picard =

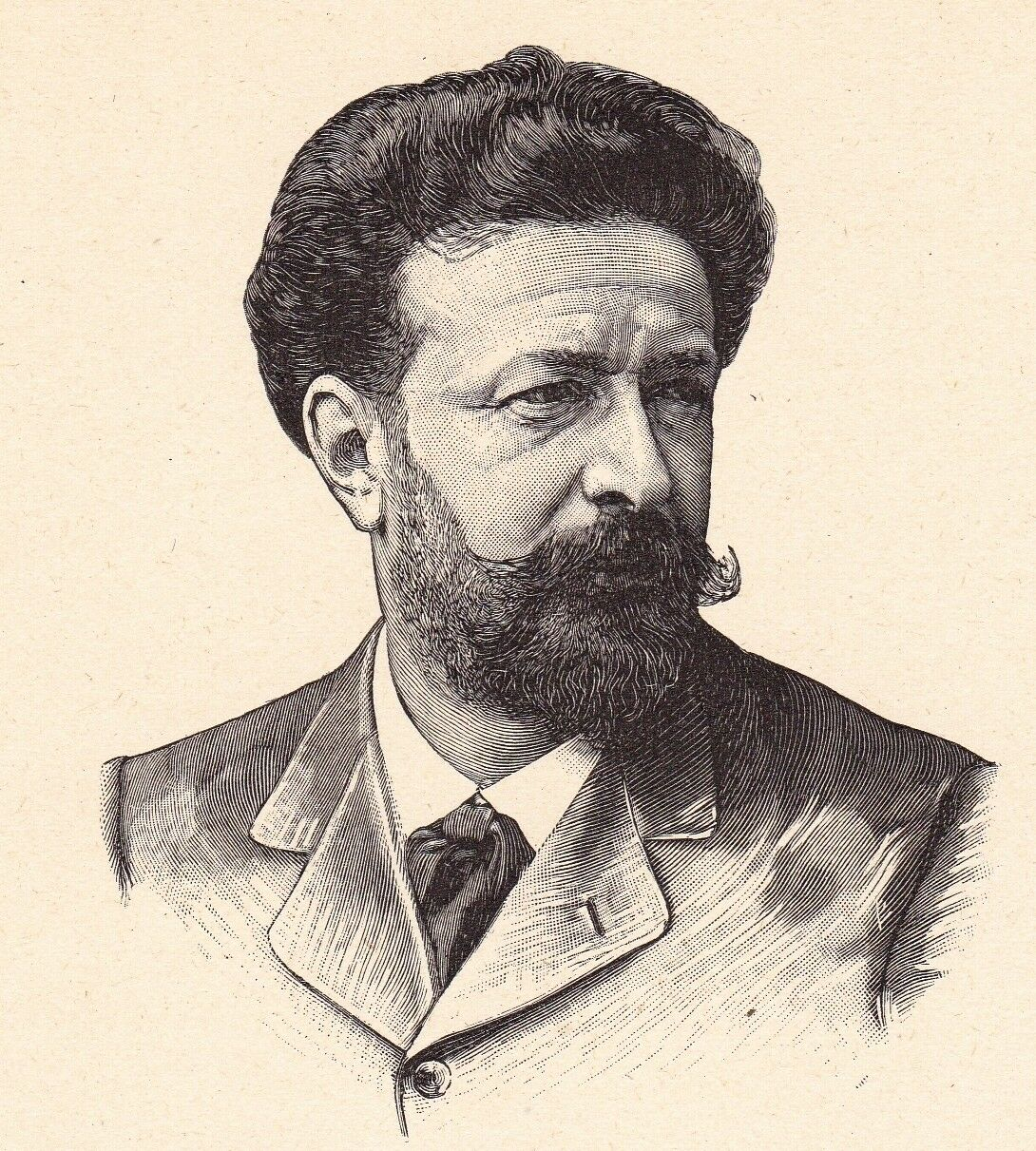
Georges Picard, from the Album Mariani (1903)

Georges Gabriel Picard (23 December 1857 in Remiremont – 25 January 1943 in Yzeures-sur-Creuse) was a French painter, decorative artist, and illustrator, of Jewish ancestry. Some sources give his year of death as 1946.

== Biography ==
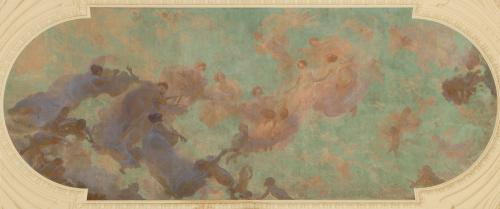
The Triumph of Women, at the Petit Palais

His father, Abraham Picard, was an embroidery maker. He completed his studies at the Lycée Charlemagne in 1877, then entered the École des Beaux-Arts, where he was a student of Jean-Léon Gérôme for two years. In 1879, he was noticed by Paul Philippoteaux, who selected him as one of five assistants to help create panoramas, for exhibition in the United States from 1885 to 1887.

His first individual showing came at the Salon in 1888. The following year, he participated in the "Salon de l'Europe" at the Casino de Monte-Carlo. Then worked with Henri Gervex and Alfred Stevens to produce a triptych for the Exposition Universelle. At the Salon of 1891, his view of the Port of Le Havre was purchased by the government. That same year, he began a series of decorations, comprising an allegory of the "Glory of Paris", in the Galerie Lobau at the Hôtel de ville. This would occupy him until 1898.

As a member of the Commission Administrative des Beaux-Arts, he intervened in favor of his friend, René Lalique, at the Salon of 1895. He was named a Knight in the Legion of Honor in 1904.

The following year, he was commissioned to decorate the ceremonial dining hall at the French Embassy in Vienna. He produced a diorama with the Palace of Versailles and the Place de la Concorde. Shortly after returning to France, he painted the plafonds in the south pavilion of the Petit Palais. A series of similar commissions followed, at the Teatro Colón in Buenos Aires, and the Opéra de Lille, among others.

In addition to painting, he worked as an illustrator for numerous journals. He also illustrated books, including the Contes (fairy tales) of Charles Perrault, as well as several works by Alphonse Daudet and Charles Nodier. Given his work as a muralist and illustrator, Picard's work is relatively scarce in public museum, although Paris' Petit Palais has a sizeable collection of drawings and preparatory studies. Studio pictures are rare; in October 2020, the picture "Sous L'Arbre Rose" ("Under The Pink Tree") sold at Sotheby's New York for $40,320 USD.

His wife, Marie Josephine, née Chypre, died in 1938. During the invasion of Alsace in 1940, he was removed from his home in Obernai and deported to Lyon, along with several Jewish families. He was discovered there by an old friend, the photographer Paul Haviland, who took him to his home in Yzeures-sur-Creuse. He died there in 1943, of cardiac arrest, with Haviland arranging to have him buried in the Yzeures cemetery.

== Selected paintings ==
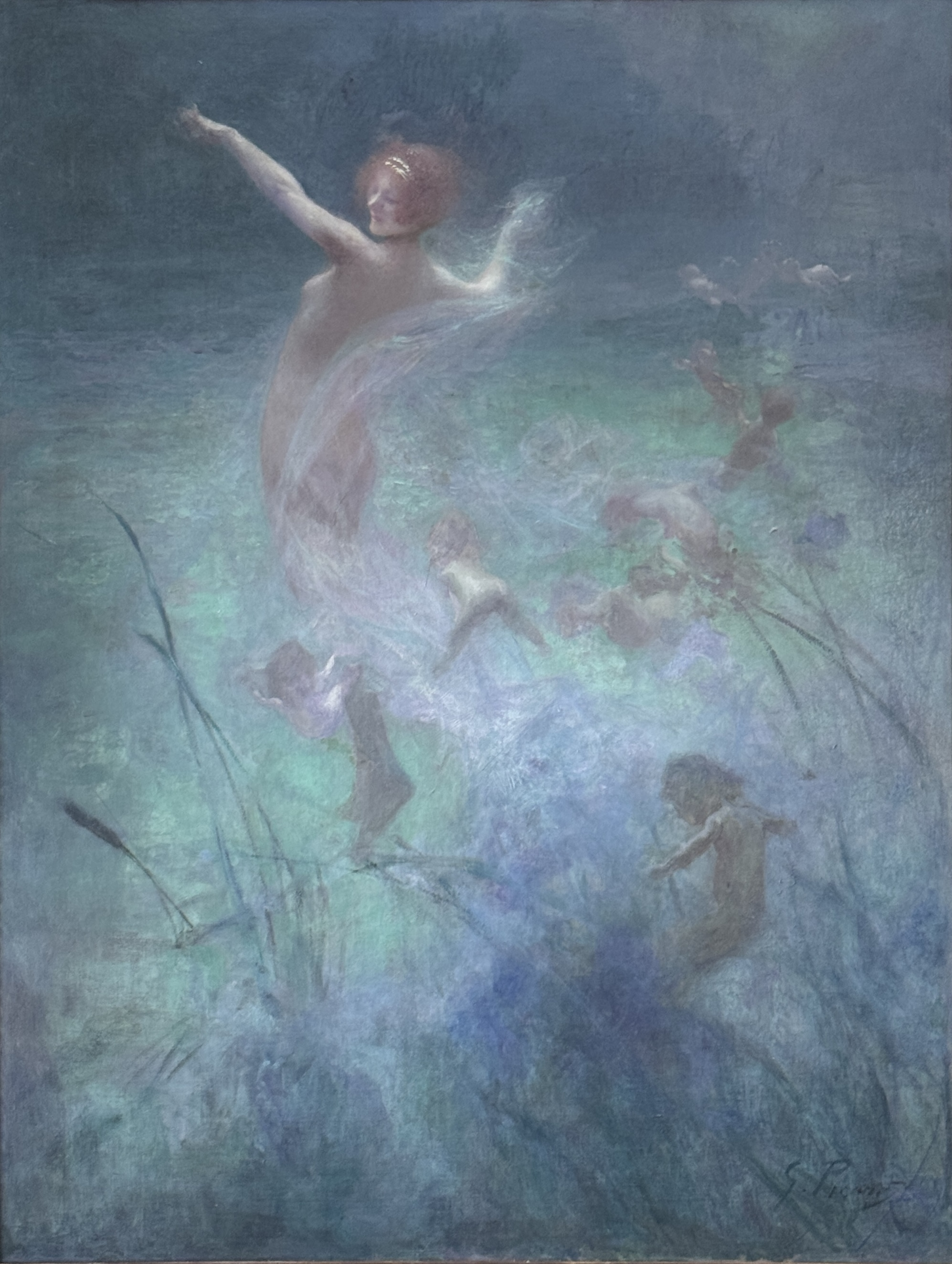
Nymphe Dansant

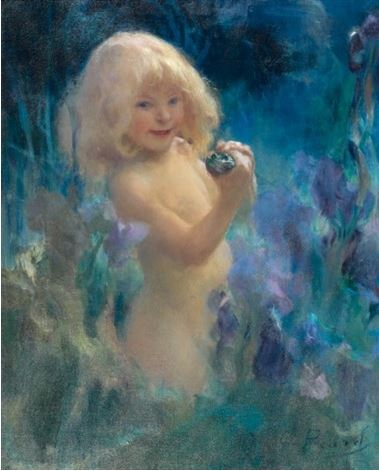
Young Girl with a Frog

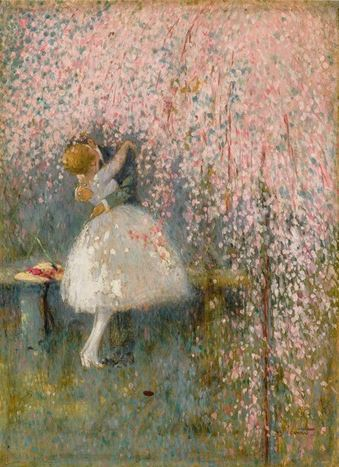
Under the Pink Tree

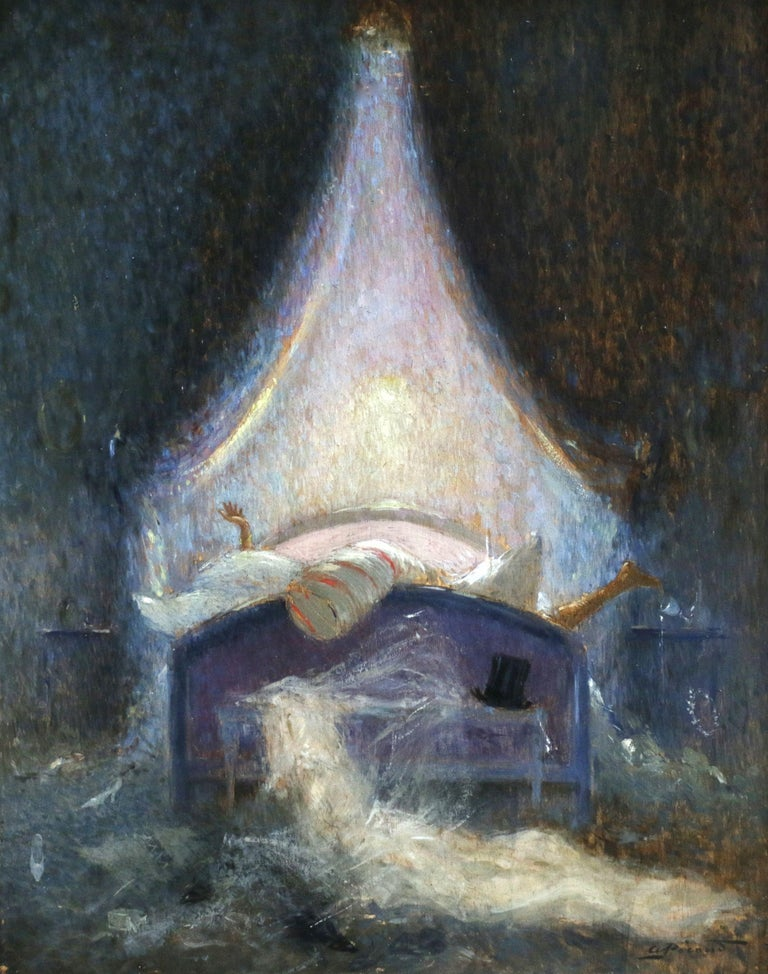
Wedding Night

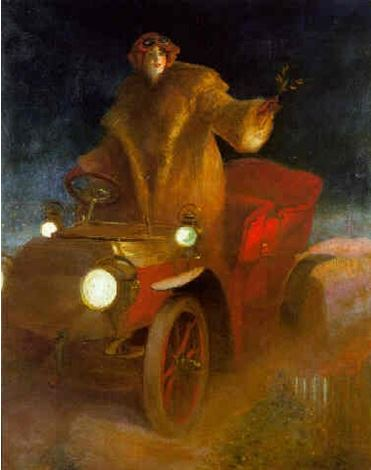
"Vive l'Auto!"

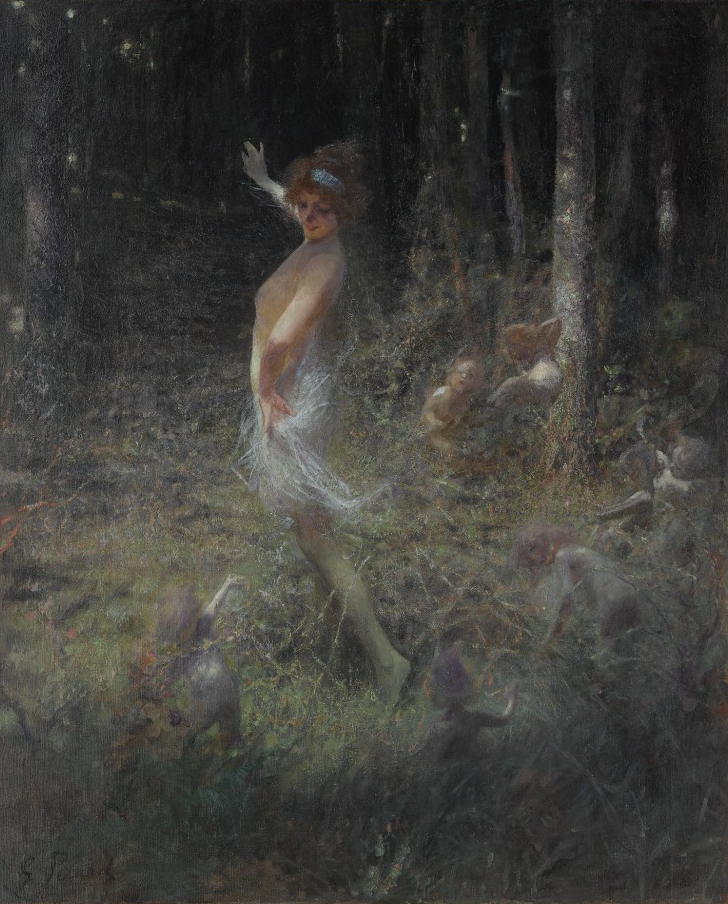
Dancing Fairies
