= Hôtel de Ville, Roubaix =

Town hall in Roubaix, France

Hôtel de Ville
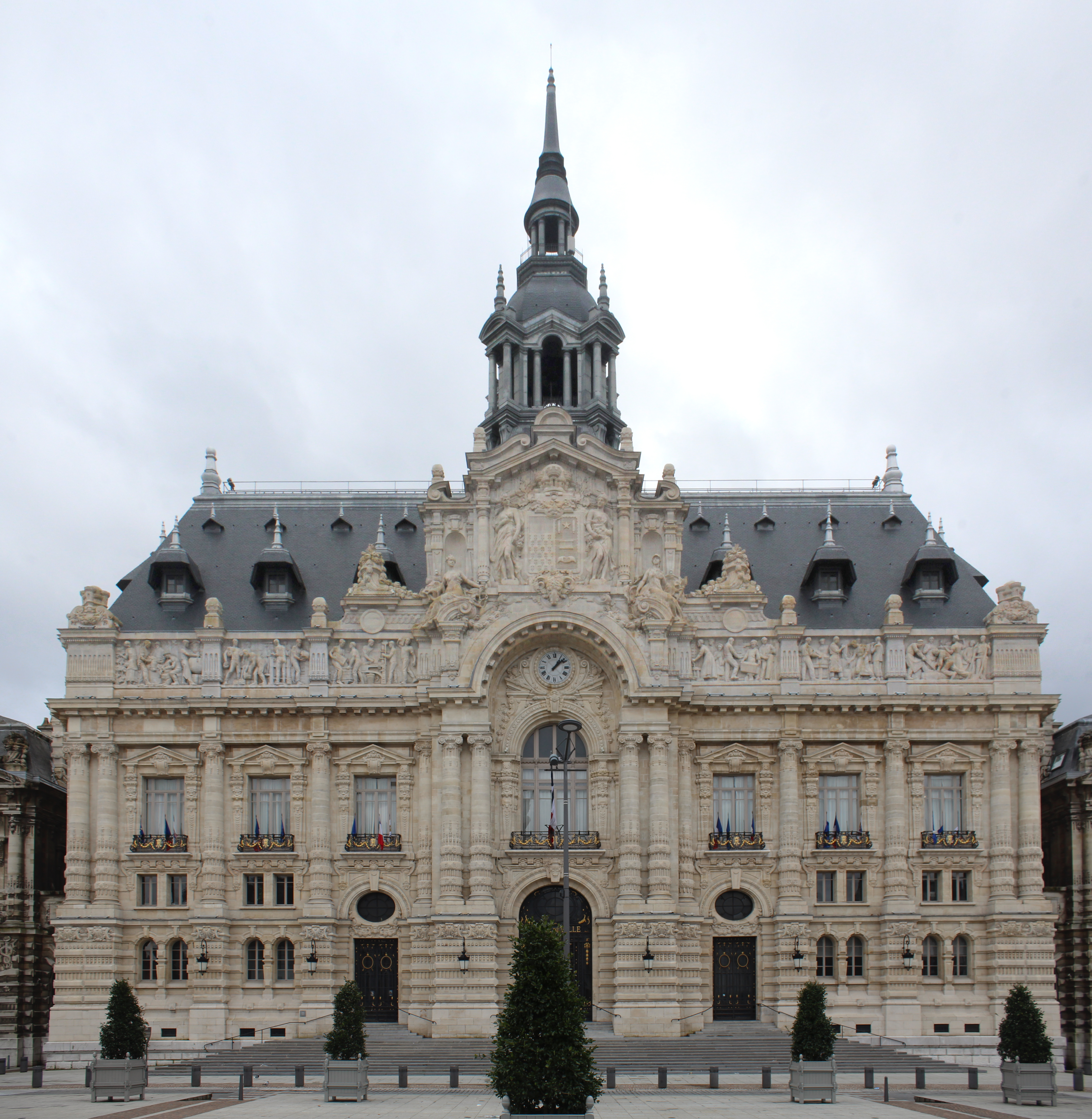
- Main frontage of the Hôtel de Ville in March 2018

General information
- Type: City hall
- Architectural style: Baroque style
- Location: Roubaix, France
- Coordinates: 50.6910°N 3.1741°E
- Completed: 1911; 115 years ago

Design and construction
- Architect: Victor Laloux

Monument historique
- Official name: Hôtel de ville
- Type: Inscrit
- Designated: 1998
- Reference no.: PA59000020

The Hôtel de Ville (French pronunciation: [otɛl də vil], City Hall) is a historic building in Roubaix, Nord, northern France, standing on the Grand Place. It was designated a monument historique by the French government in 1998.

== History ==
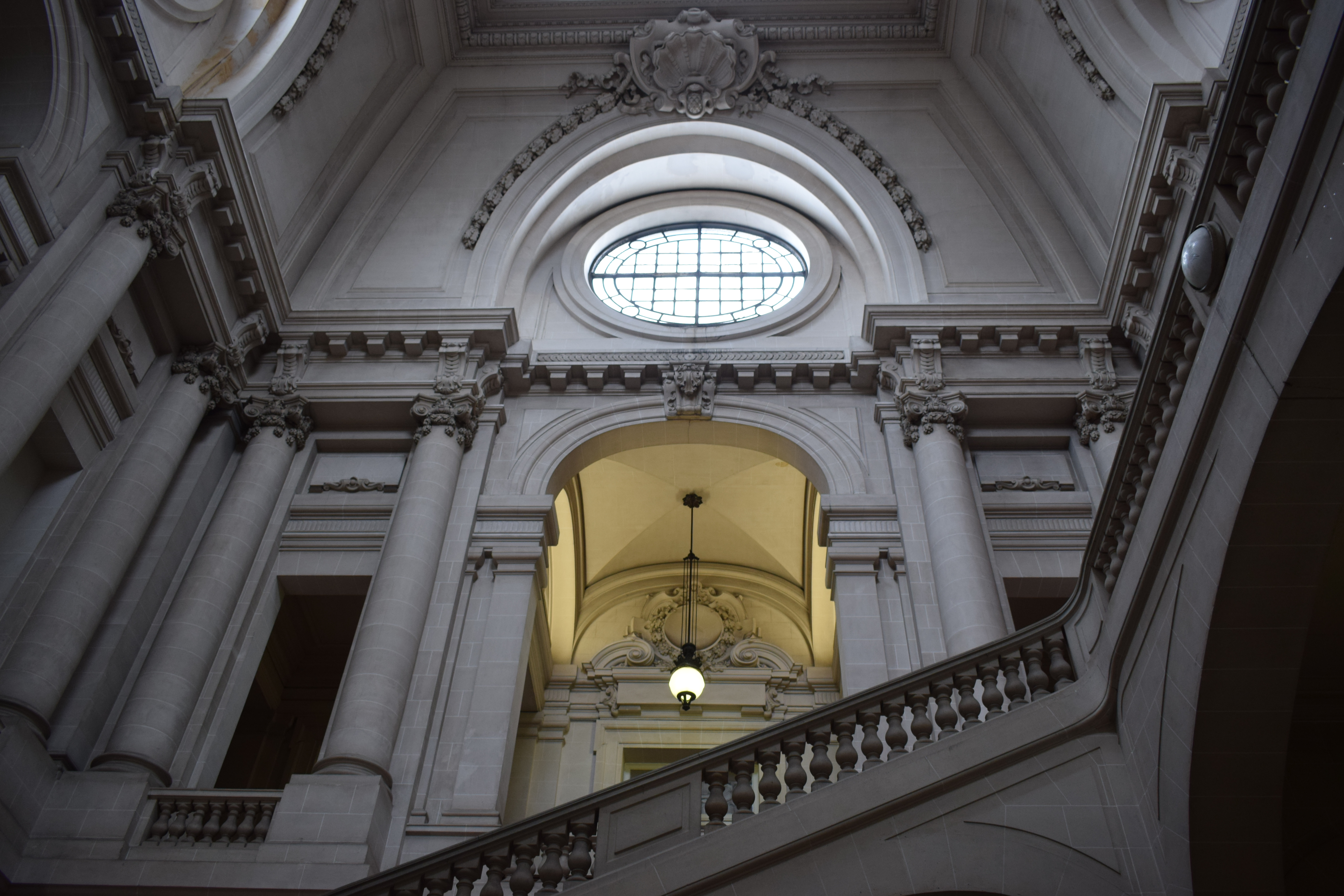
Staircase inside the building

The first meeting place of the aldermen of Roubaix was in an alderman's house on the corner of the Rue du Château and the Grand Place. When the house became dilapidated, the council moved to Sainte-Elisabeth Hospital in 1792: a tetrastyle portico was added to the building, to give it more grandeur, in 1810. By the 1840s, the council had ambitions for a building which demonstrated its wealth as a major wool-trading centre and a new town hall was erected on the south side of the Grand Place to a design by Achille-Joseph Dewarlez in 1848.

In the early 20th century, the council, led by the mayor, Eugène Motte, decided to commission an even grander building on the same site. The proposed layout involved a central block and two smaller pavilions, one on either side. Construction work on the left pavilion started in 1903. The design was entrusted to Ernest Thibeau but, for reasons of ill health, he was unable to develop the design for the other two buildings. The main block and the right pavilion were designed by Victor Laloux in the Baroque style, built in ashlar stone and were officially opened by the Minister of Commerce, Alfred Massé, in time for the International Exhibition of the North of France on 30 April 1911.

The design of the main block involved a symmetrical main frontage of seven bays facing onto the Grand Place. The central bay featured a round headed doorway with voussoirs and a keystone on the ground floor, and a round headed French door with an archivolt on the first floor, flanked by pairs of Ionic order columns supporting a huge semi-circular modillioned arch. The bays flanking the central bay contained square headed doorways surmounted by oculi on the ground floor, and casement windows with pediments on the first floor, while the outer bays were fenestrated by pairs of small round headed windows surmounted by pairs of small square headed windows on the ground floor, and casement windows with pediments on the first floor. These bays were flanked by Ionic order columns supporting an entablature and a modillioned cornice.

At roof level, there was a finely carved parapet broken by an equally finely carved central pediment, behind which there was a hexagonal belfry with a spire. The parapet, sculpted by Alphonse-Amédée Cordonnier, depicted various aspects of the wool trade including sheep shearing, wool washing, spinning, weaving, dyeing and finishing. The central pediment, sculpted by Hippolyte Lefèbvre, depicted the city's coat of arms and was flanked by two statues depicting abundance and peace.

The main block contained the civic reception rooms, included the Salle Pierre de Roubaix on the ground floor, which featured a mural by Jean-Joseph Weerts depicting the proclamation of the drapers' charter, granting the town's drapers the rights "to drape cloth of all wools" in 1469. The left-hand pavilion was allocated to the local chamber of commerce, while the right-hand pavilion was used by staff responsible for the delivery of municipal services.

In October 1914, during the First World War, a company of the 165th Bavarian Regiment of Infantry occupied Roubaix with its headquarters in the town hall. During the liberation of the town by the French Forces of the Interior on 2 September 1944, during the Second World War, the Nazi flag was torn down from the town hall and the mayor, Victor Provo, hoisted the French tricolour flag in its place. A major programme of restoration works, involving repairs to the roof and the external walls, was completed between 2011 and 2013.
