= Jean Antoine Injalbert =

French sculptor (1845–1933)

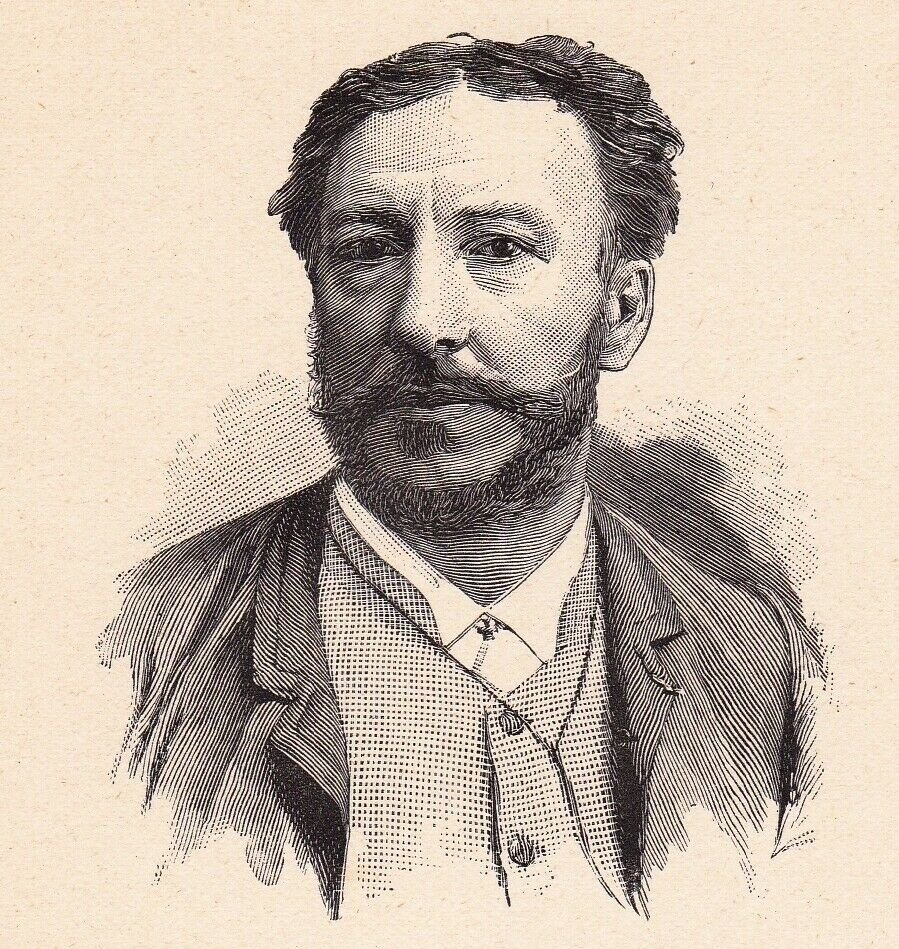
- Born: 3 February 1845; Béziers, France
- Died: 20 January 1933 (aged 87); Paris, France
- Known for: Sculpture

Jean-Antoine Injalbert (French pronunciation: [ʒɑ̃ ɑ̃twan ɛ̃ʒalbɛʁ]; Béziers, 3 February 1845 – Paris, 20 January 1933) was a French sculptor.

== Life ==
The son of a stonemason, Injalbert was a pupil of Augustin-Alexandre Dumont and won the prestigious Prix de Rome in 1874. At the Exposition Universelle of 1889 he won the Grand Prix, and in 1900 was a member of the jury. On the day of the inauguration of the Pont Mirabeau in Paris, Injalbert was made an officer of the Légion d'honneur. In 1905, he was made a member of the Institut de France, and in 1910 promoted to Commander of the Légion d'honneur.

His work shows powerful imagination and strong personality, as well as great knowledge. From about 1915, he became influential as a teacher, at the Académie Colarossi and as chief instructor at the École des Beaux Arts. Among his many students were Prague sculptor František Bílek, Alfred Janniot, Fernand Guignier, Gleb W. Derujinsky and the American sculptor Edward McCartan, and Aaron Goodelman.

== Work ==
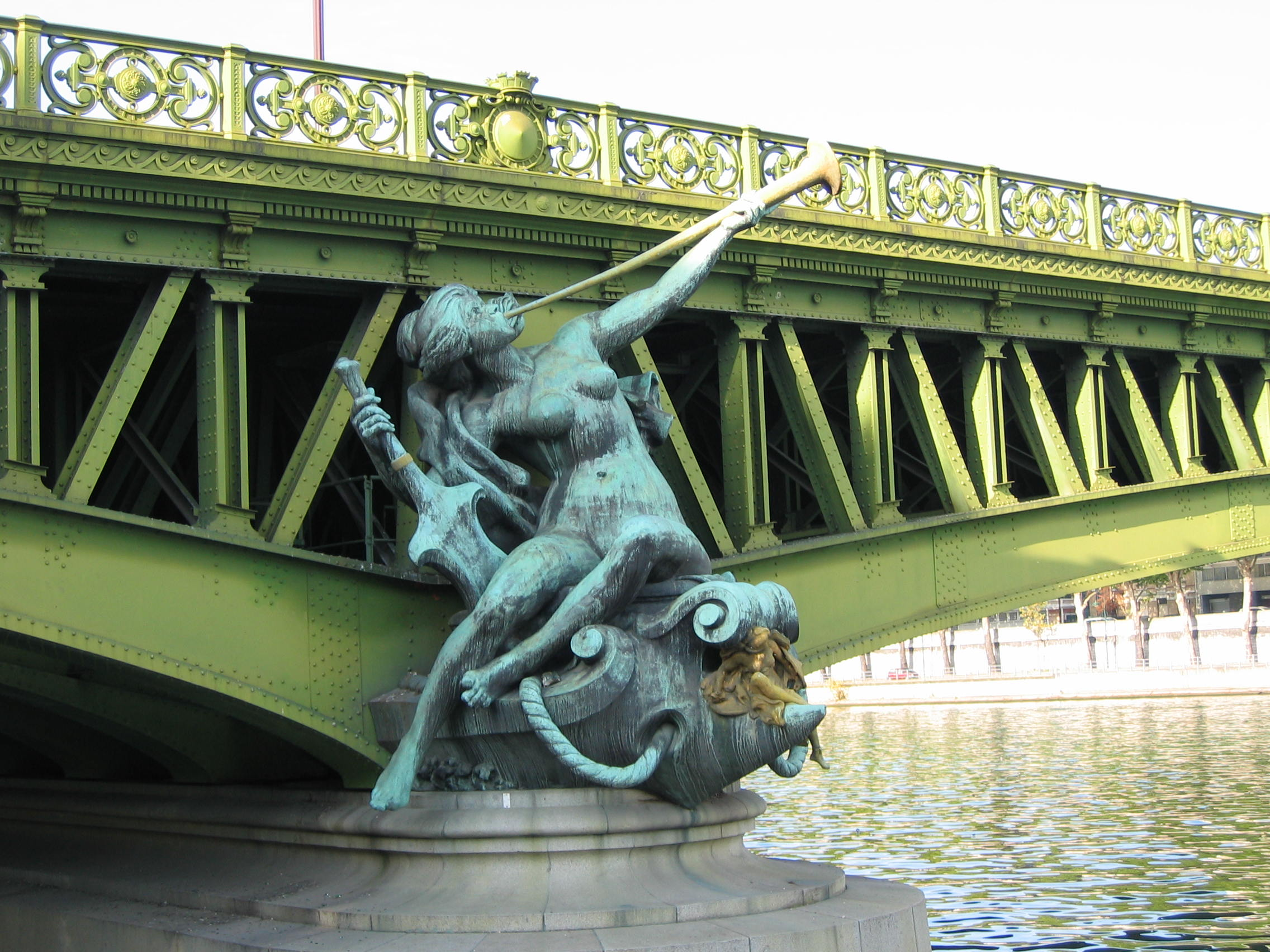
Abundance at Pont Mirabeau, Paris

- four allegorical figures on the Pont Mirabeau, Paris: The City of Paris, Navigation, Commerce and Abundance, 1896
- monument to Molière at Pézenas, 1897
- Crucifixion, at the Cathedral of Rheims, 1898
- Bordeaux and Toulouse, allegorical statues for the Gare de Tours, 1898, for architect Victor Laloux
- tympanum depicting the city of Paris surrounded by muses, Petit Palais Paris, circa 1900
- allegorical figures of the Loire and the Cher rivers, for the Hôtel de Ville, Tours, for Laloux, c. 1900
- figures of Electricity and Commerce on the Pont de Bir-Hakeim, Paris, 1905
- Monument to the Dead, Béziers, 1925
- Hippomenes at the Jardin du Luxembourg, Paris
- Eve After the Fall, in Montpellier
- monument to Sadi-Carnot in Sète
- Love Conquering the Lion, Fame, The Laughing Child and several others, in Béziers
- figure of Honoré Mirabeau at the Panthéon (Paris)
- bust of Louis Gallet, in Valence, Drôme

== Gallery ==
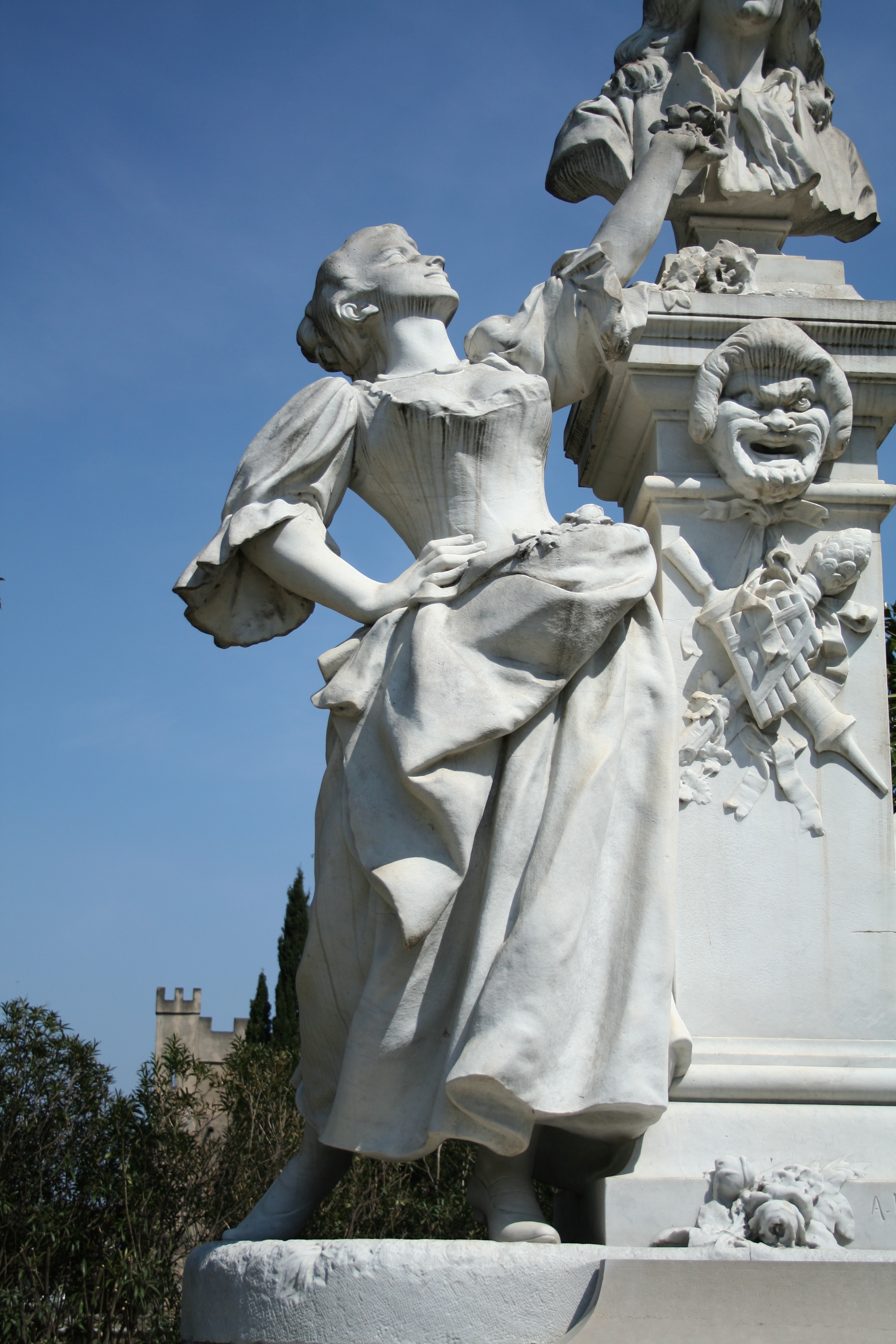
Detail of the Monument to Molière in Pézenas

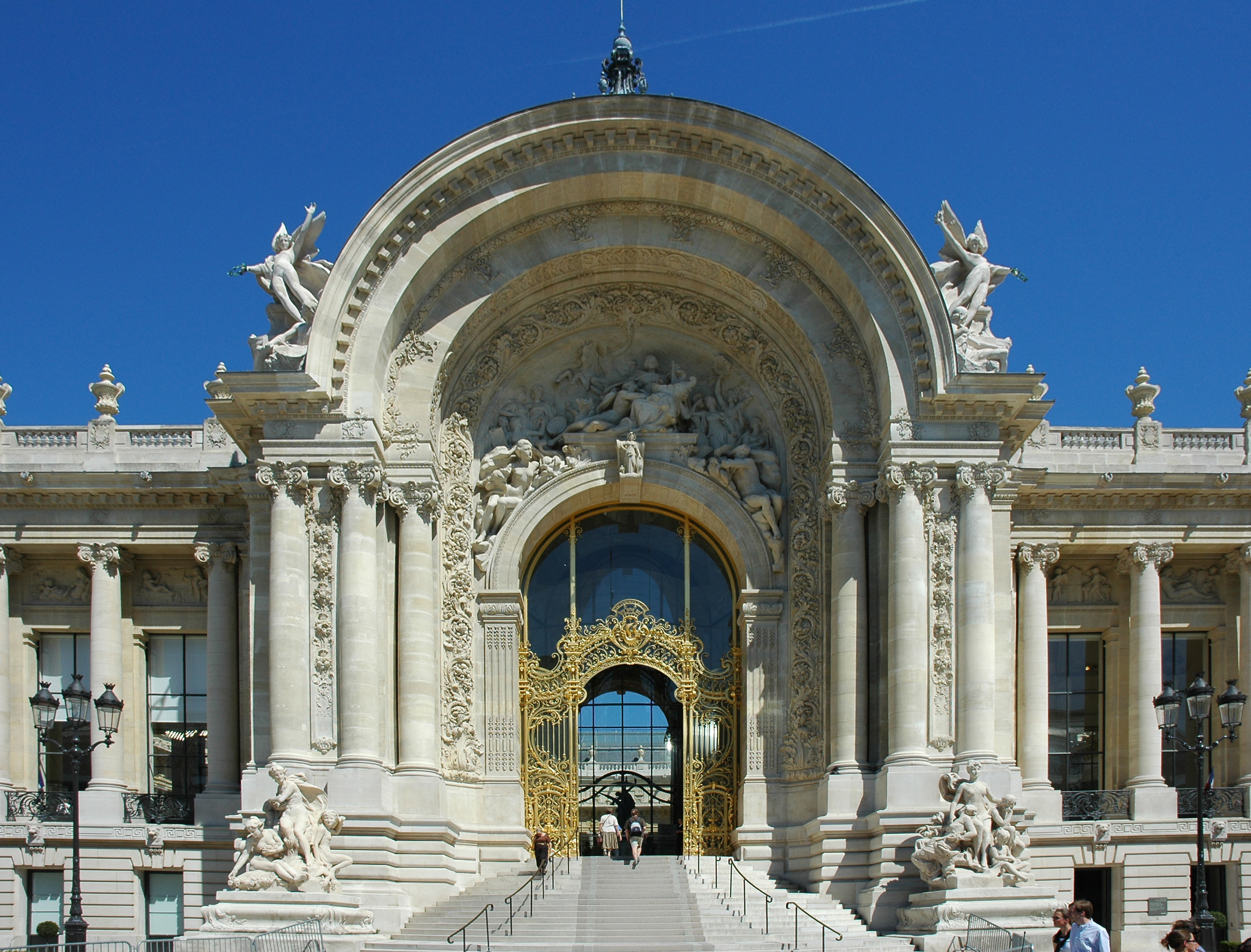
Entrance to the Petit Palais, Paris

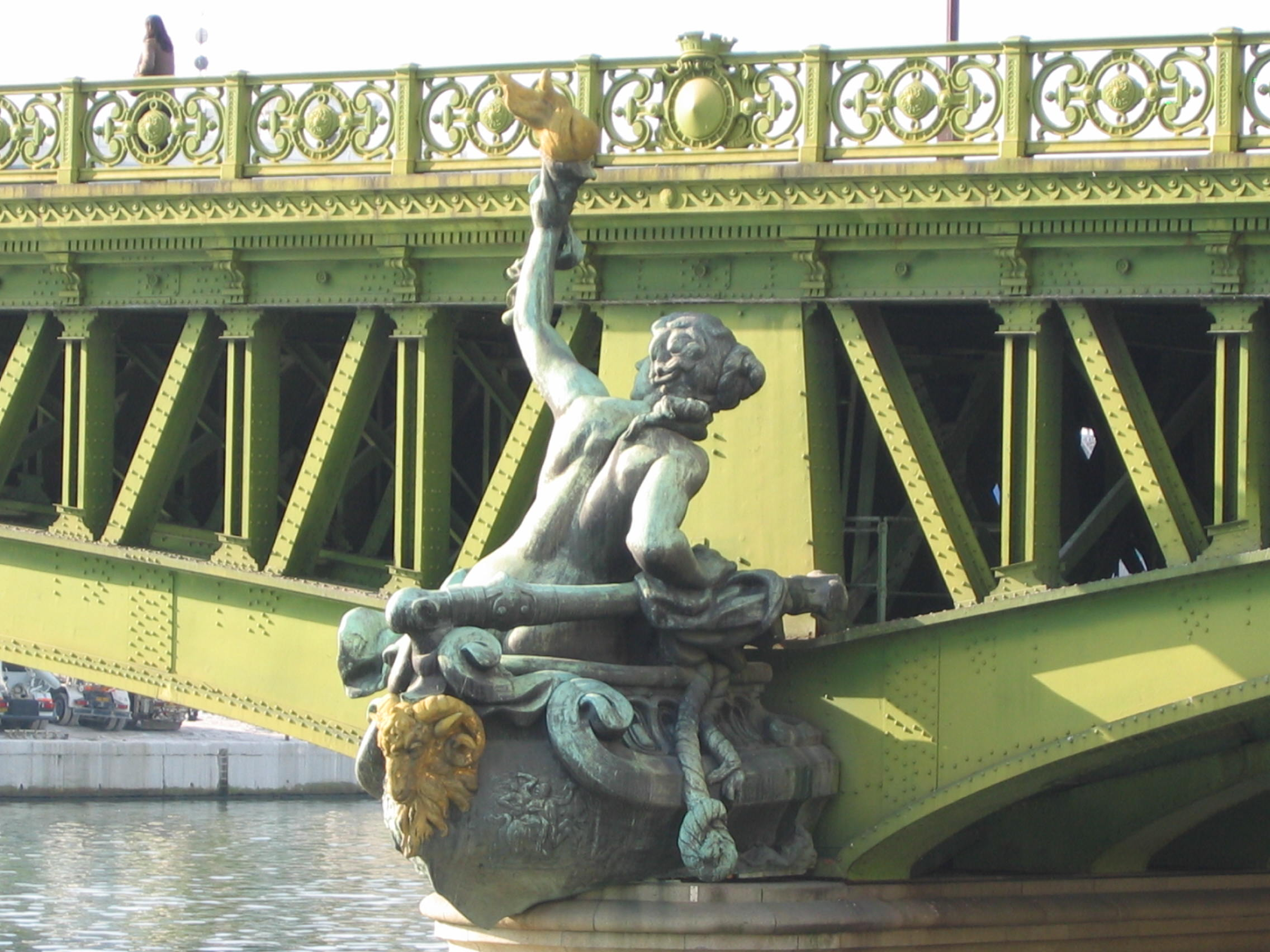
Navigation at the Pont Mirabeau

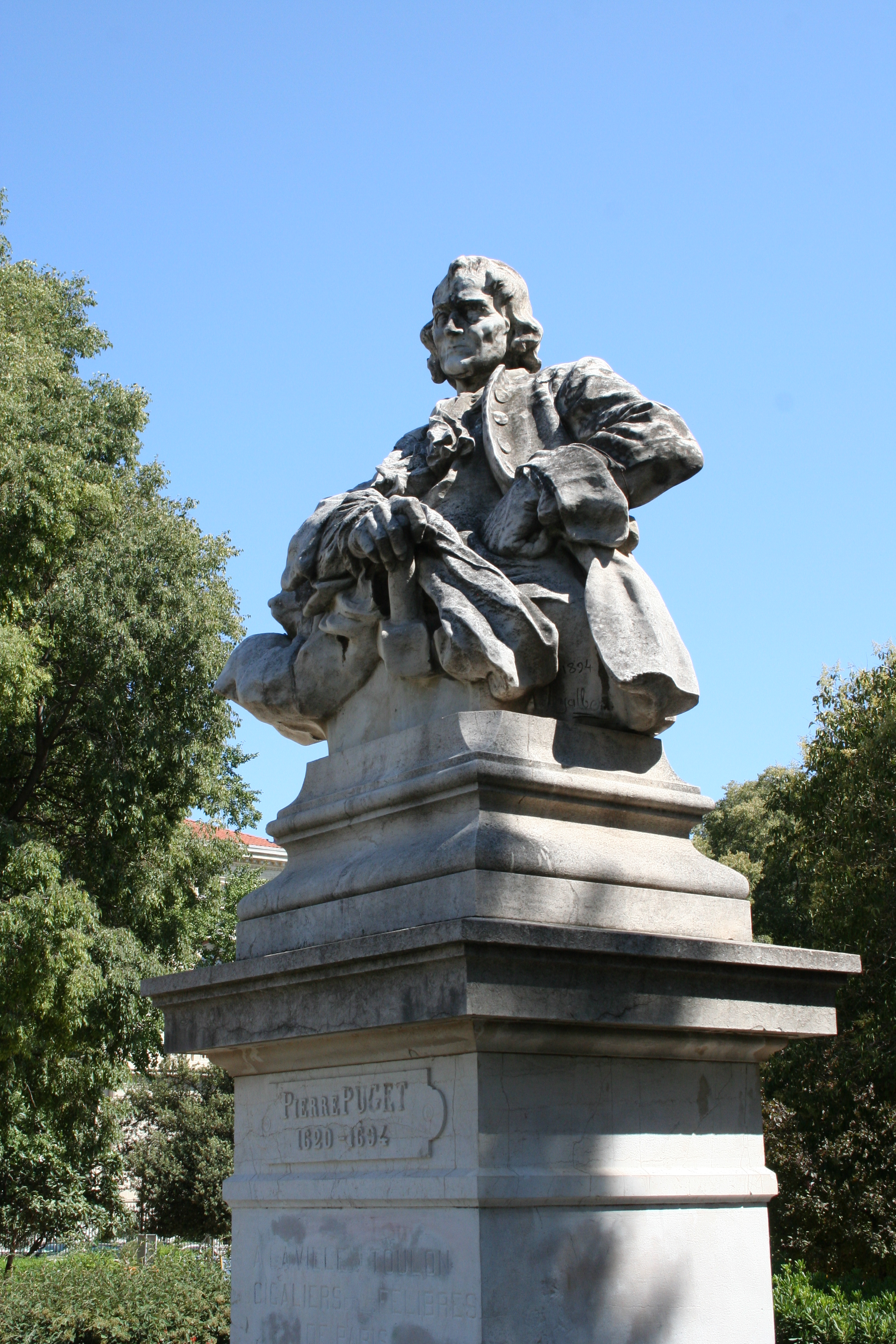
Monument to Pierre Puget, Toulon

== See also ==
- List of works by Jean Antoine Injalbert
