= Victor Laloux =

French architect (1850–1937)

Victor-Alexandre-Frédéric Laloux
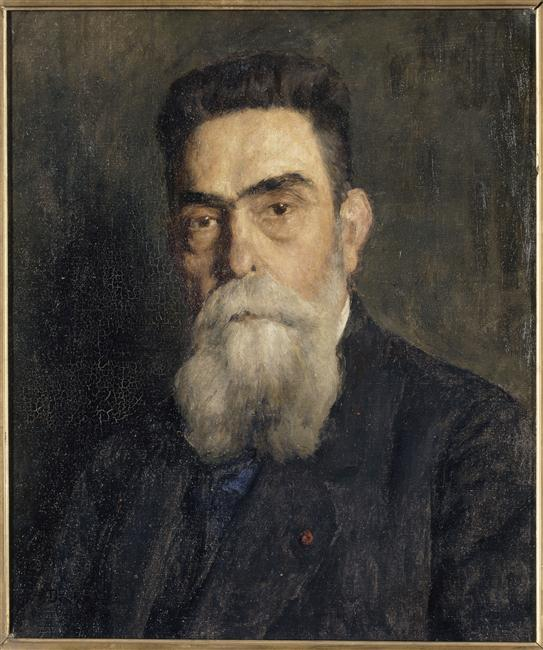
- Portrait by Adolphe Déchenaud
- Born: 15 November 1850; Tours, France
- Died: 13 July 1937 (aged 86); Paris, France
- Education: École des Beaux-Arts (atelier of Louis-Jules André)
- Occupation: Architect
- Movement: Beaux-Arts architecture
- Awards: AIA Gold Medal (1922); Royal Gold Medal (1929)
- Buildings: Basilica of St. Martin, Tours; Gare de Tours; Gare d'Orsay (now Musée d'Orsay); Hôtel de Ville, Roubaix; Hôtel de Ville, Tours; Crédit Lyonnais headquarters (Paris); U.S. Embassy, Paris; Palais du Hanovre, Paris

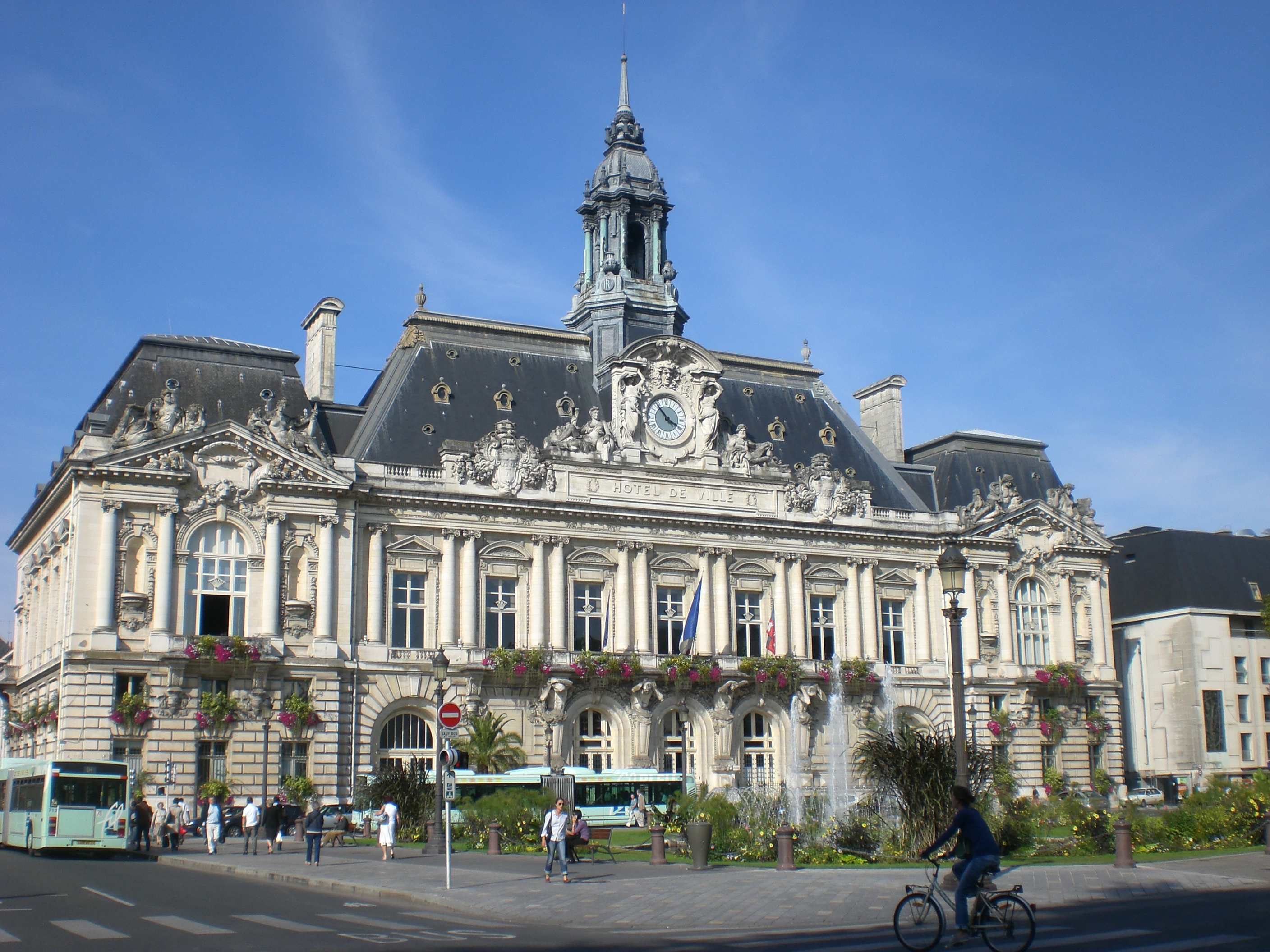
Hôtel de Ville, Tours

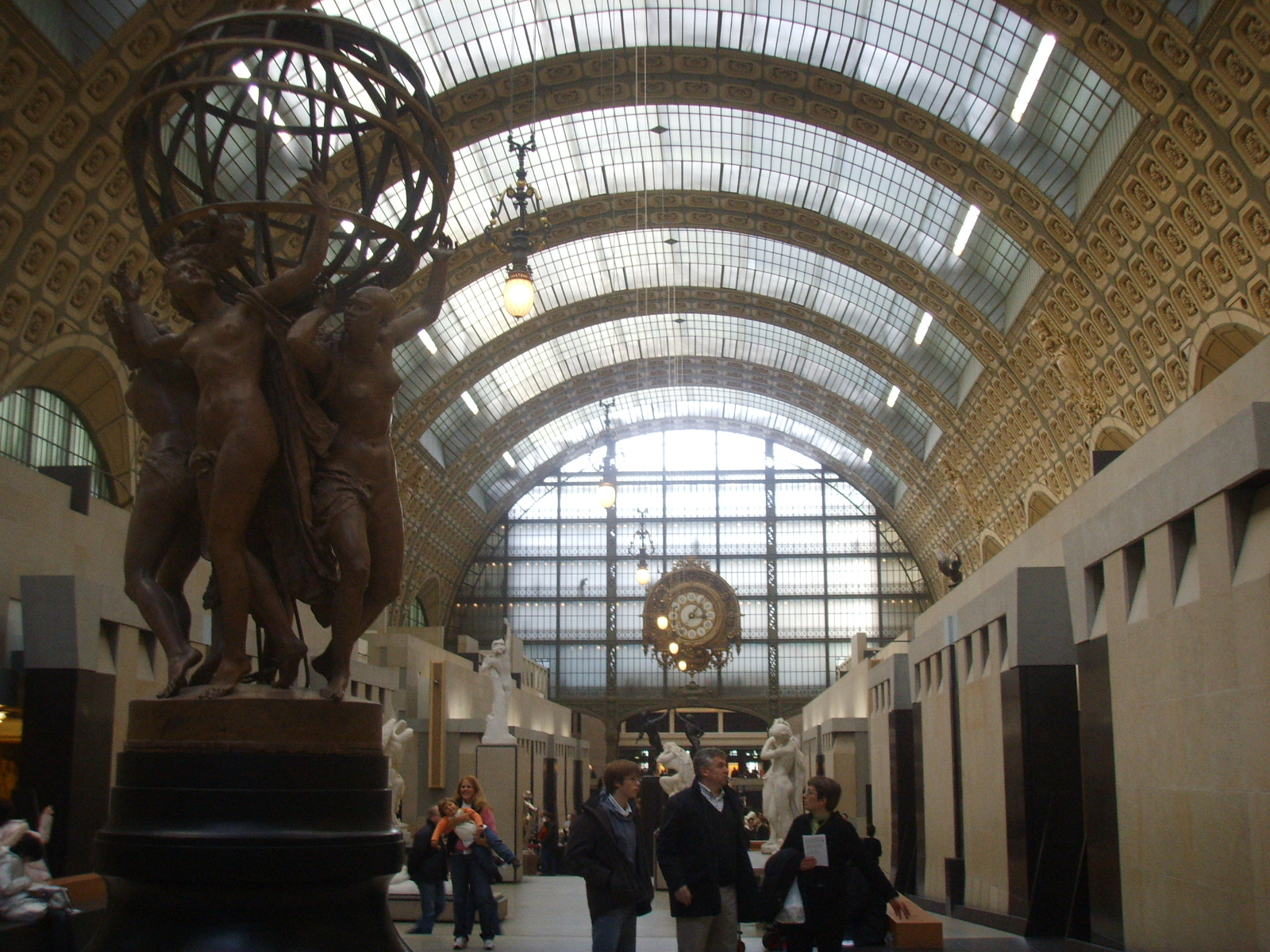
interior, Gare d'Orsay, now the Musée d'Orsay, 1900

Victor-Alexandre-Frédéric Laloux (French pronunciation: [viktɔʁ alɛksɑ̃dʁ fʁedeʁik lalu]; 15 November 1850 – 13 July 1937) was a French Beaux-Arts architect and teacher.

== Early life and education ==
Born in Tours, Laloux studied at the Paris École des Beaux-Arts atelier of Louis-Jules André, with his studies interrupted by the Franco-Prussian War, and was awarded the annual Prix de Rome in 1878. He spent 1879 through 1882 at the Villa Medici in Rome.

== Career ==
On his return to France Laloux rose quickly through the academic system, serving on many juries, societies and foundations. As practitioner, he produced major commissions in a highly ornamented neo-classical surface style, collaborating with sculptors and muralists squarely in the Beaux-Arts tradition, but doing so on innovative cast-iron frames. Metal framing allowed higher interior spaces, more generous fenestration, and glass roofs, notably in the sunlit barrel-vault of the Gare d'Orsay.

Laloux was awarded the American AIA Gold Medal in 1922, and the RIBA Royal Gold Medal in 1929. In 1932, he was elected into the National Academy of Design as an Honorary Corresponding Academician. In 1936, the year before his death, his successor as head of the atelier was his own student, Charles Lemaresquier. He died in Paris, aged 86.

== Work ==
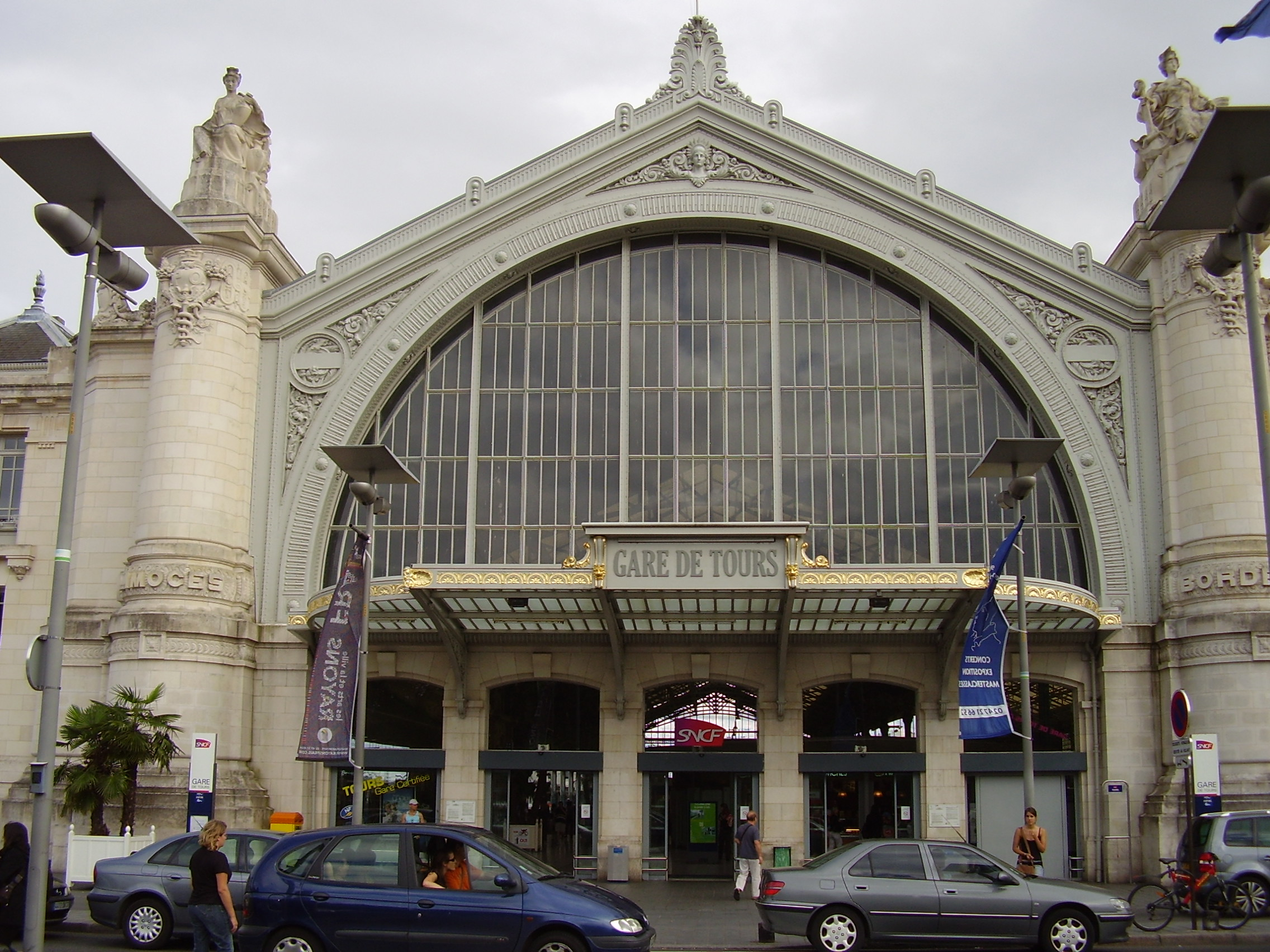
Gare de Tours, Tours

Laloux's work includes:

- the neo-Byzantine Basilica of St. Martin, Tours, in Tours, 1886–1924 – a project with some political connotations as it was built to replace an earlier Basilica destroyed during the French Revolution.
- Gare de Tours, in Tours, 1896–1898, with four allegorical limestone statues of cities by Jean Antoine Injalbert (Bordeaux and Toulouse) and Jean-Baptiste Hugues (Limoges and Nantes)
- the Paris Gare d'Orsay, now the Musée d'Orsay, 1900
- Hôtel de Ville, Roubaix, with architectural sculpture by Alphonse-Amédée Cordonnier, 1903
- Hôtel de Ville, Tours, with sculpture by Injalbert, Hugues, Cordonnier and others, 1904
- completion of the Crédit Lyonnais headquarters, Paris, 1913
- the U.S. Embassy, Paris, with his student, American architect William Delano, 1931
- Palais du Hanovre, Paris, with his student Charles Lemaresquier, 1932

== Influence ==
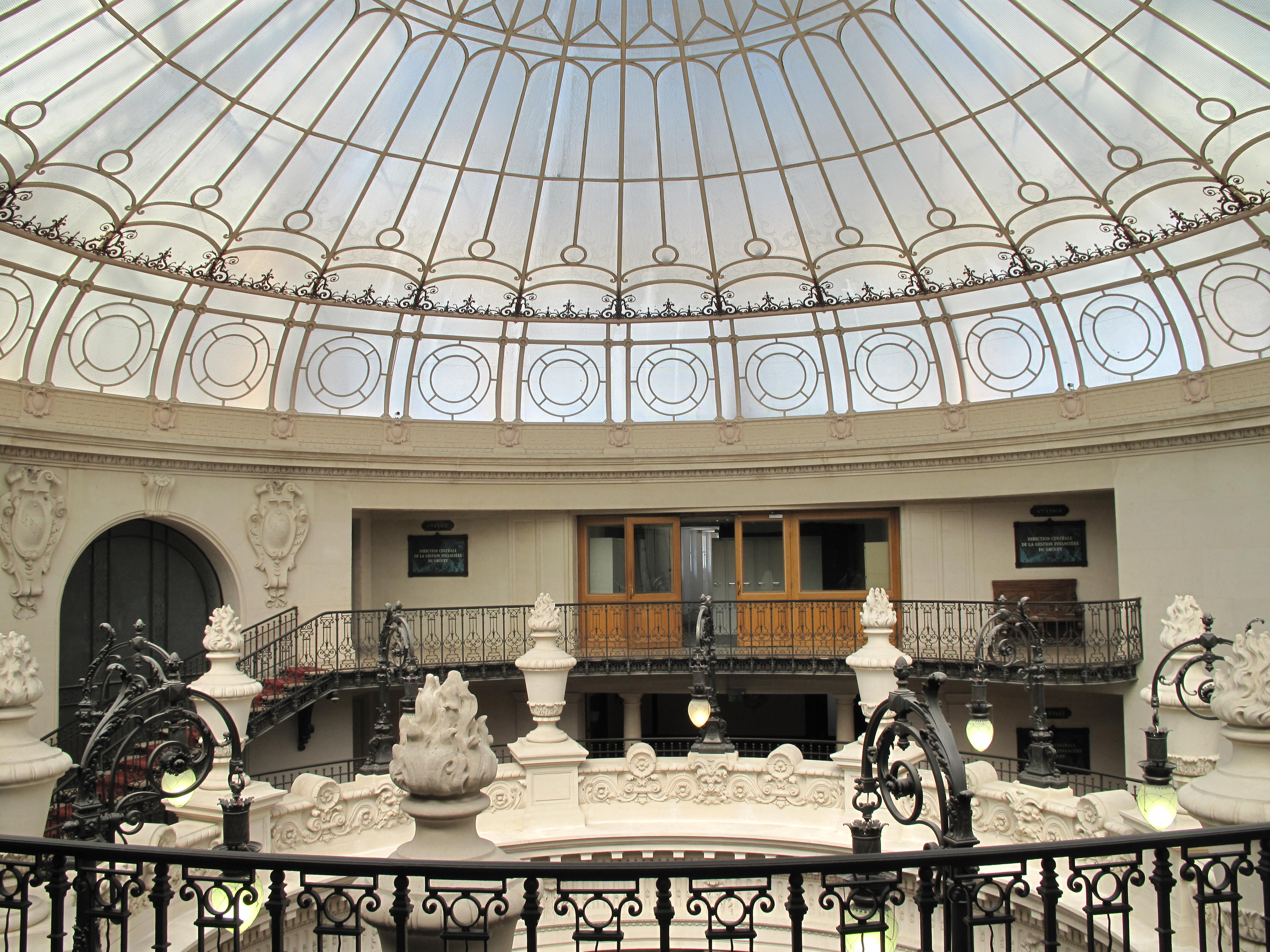
Domed staircase, Credit Lyonnais headquarters

As professor, Laloux assumed the direction of Louis-Jules André's atelier when André died in 1890. Laloux would ultimately train about 600 students through the years, including 132 Americans. Laloux had the distinction of training the greatest number of American students at the Ecole, with Jean-Louis Pascal in second place. Laloux's influence is visible in the U.S. in buildings like the 1921 San Francisco City Hall.

Atelier training in the context of the École focused on the annual Prix de Rome competition, and by this measure Laloux was also the school's most successful teacher, training 16 winners. At Laloux's death in 1937, his student and partner Charles Lemaresquier succeeded him as head of the studio.

The students educated in Laloux's atelier include:

- Arthur Brown, Jr., American
- Charles Weeks of Weeks and Day, American
- Duiliu Marcu, Romanian
- François-Benjamin Chaussemiche, French
- George Howe, American
- George Shepard Chappell, American
- Georges Gromort, French
- Guillaume Tronchet, French
- Gustave Louis Jaulmes, French
- Henry Gutton, French
- Hippolyte Delaporte, French
- Jacques Carlu, French
- Jacques Debat-Ponsan, French
- John Walter Cross of Cross and Cross, American
- José Marques da Silva, Portuguese
- Lucien Weissenburger, French
- Miguel Ventura Terra, Portuguese
- Robert Touzin (fr), French
- William Delano, American
- William Lawrence Bottomley, American
- William Van Alen, American, designer of the Chrysler Building
