= Pierre-Adrien Dalpayrat =

French ceramist (1844–1910)

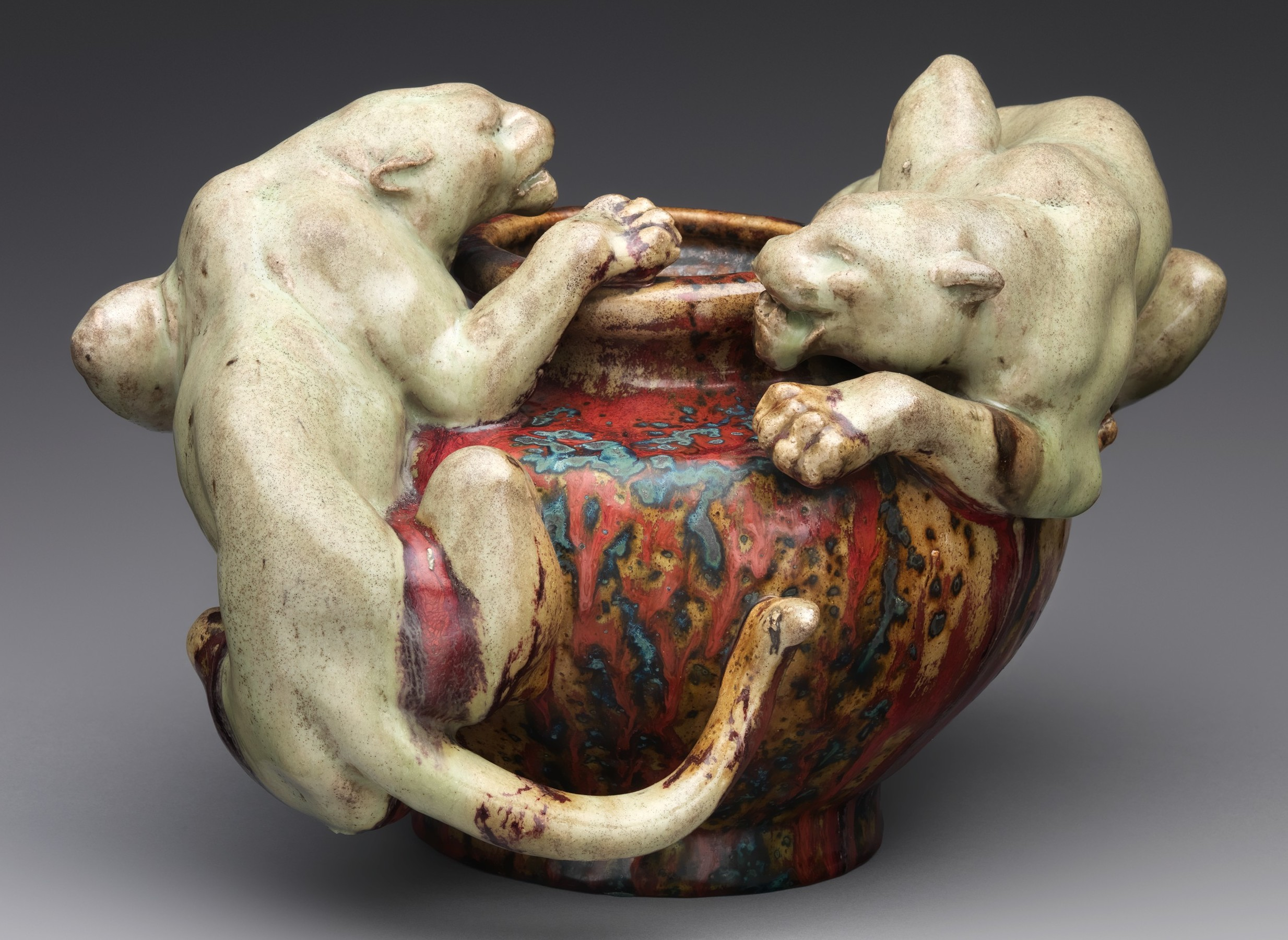
Bowl with panthers, 1894–95, including "Rouge Dalpayrat" glaze.

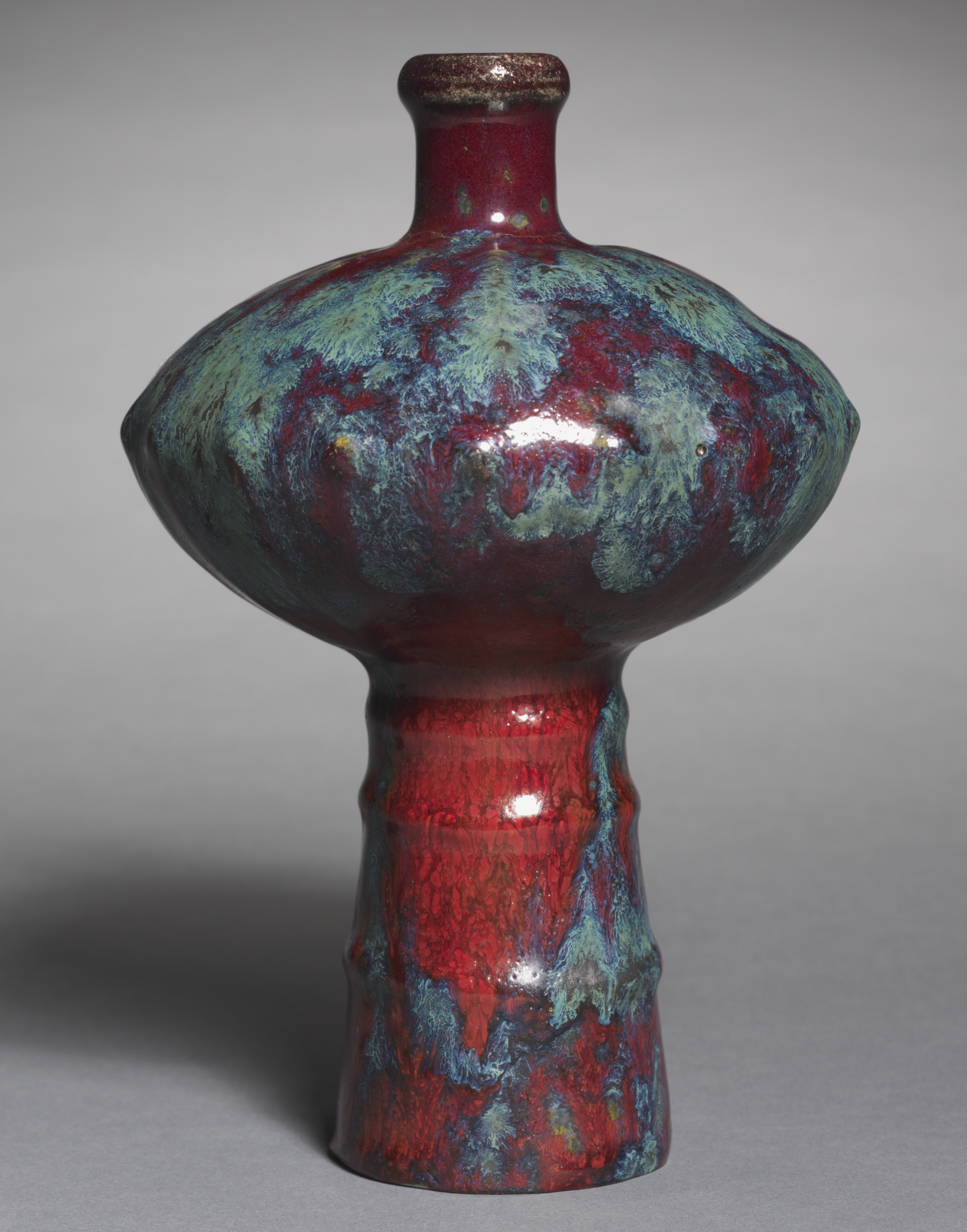
Vase, c. 1900

Pierre-Adrien Dalpayrat or Adrien Dalpayrat (14 April 1844 – 10 August 1910) was a French potter who was a significant figure in French art pottery, especially known for his innovative coloured ceramic glazes, mostly on stoneware, but also earthenware and porcelain. After working for several makers of faience, mostly in the south, from 1889 he established his own studio in Bourg-la-Reine, not far from Paris, with his work on sale in various galleries in the capital and other cities.

== Rouge Dalpayrat ==
He invented the copper-based red glaze colour known as "Rouge Dalpayrat" after him, a variety of sang de boeuf glaze:

Dalpayrat's red is more a material than a colour. The basic colour is usually blood red, obtained from copper oxide, but can also be a moss green, amber or leaden grey, or all those at once. The diversity of the palette suggests the use of many specific oxides generating a particular colour. But this is not the case: the colours, flamed or otherwise, result from subtle variations in the proportions and the firing of the formula based on copper alone.

== Works ==
His shapes were often sculptural, either in their broad shape, or sometimes incorporating figures modelled by sculptors he collaborated with. The Symbolist sculptor Alphonse Voisin-Delacroix (1857–1893) was one collaborator until his early death. Like some other Art Nouveau potters Dalpayrat often made pieces to be mounted with metal elements by metalworking firms, including one lamp base designed with a glass and metal shade by Tiffany Studios of New York. This marriage was very likely arranged by Siegfried Bing, whose Paris gallery Maison de l'Art Nouveau sold works by both makers. An inkwell with bronze mounts, also in the Metropolitan Museum of Art, has the metal marked by Edward Colonna, a regular designer in metal for Bing.

His largest work was an elaborate cheminée, or fireplace with overmantel, in blackened poplar wood with many stoneware inserts, which was sold to the French state for the Musée du Luxembourg (it is now in the Musée d'Orsay, both in Paris). This was made with his business partner Adèle Lesbros, who also financed him. He won a number of prizes in national and international competitions and shows that were an important route for ceramicists to promote their work, culminating in gold medals in the World's Fairs the World's Columbian Exposition (Chicago, 1893) and Exposition Universelle, Paris 1900.

His wife and three sons joined in the business, but it closed in 1906, after which he retired to his native Limoges. His house and workshop in Bourg-la-Reine is now owned by the town and holds the musée Dalpayrat, with more than 120 of his pieces.

In 2015, two Dalpayrat vases in an auction at Christie's New York sold for US$23,750, and US$17,500.

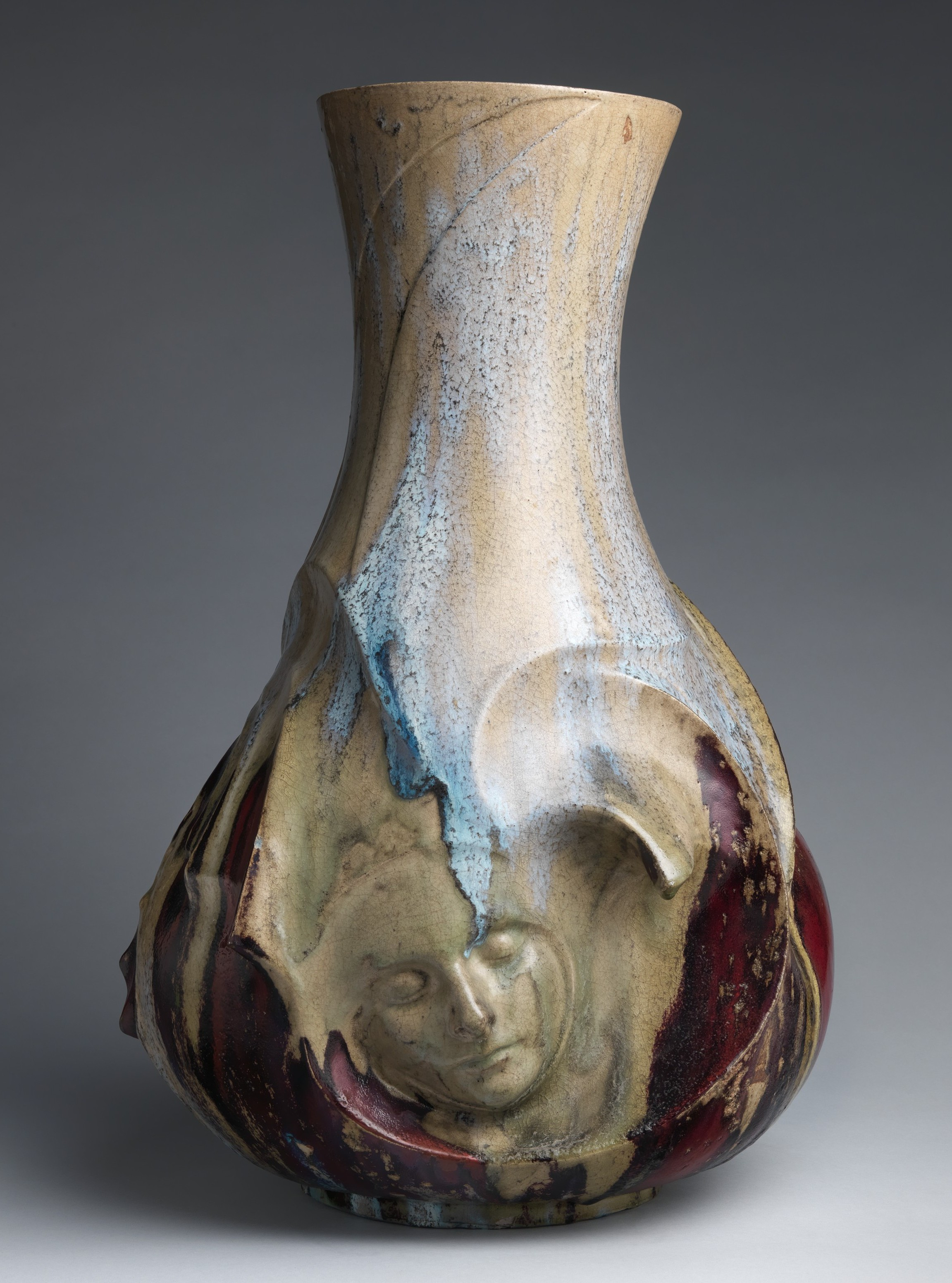
Vase with face, 1892–93, modelled by Alphonse Voisin-Delacroix.

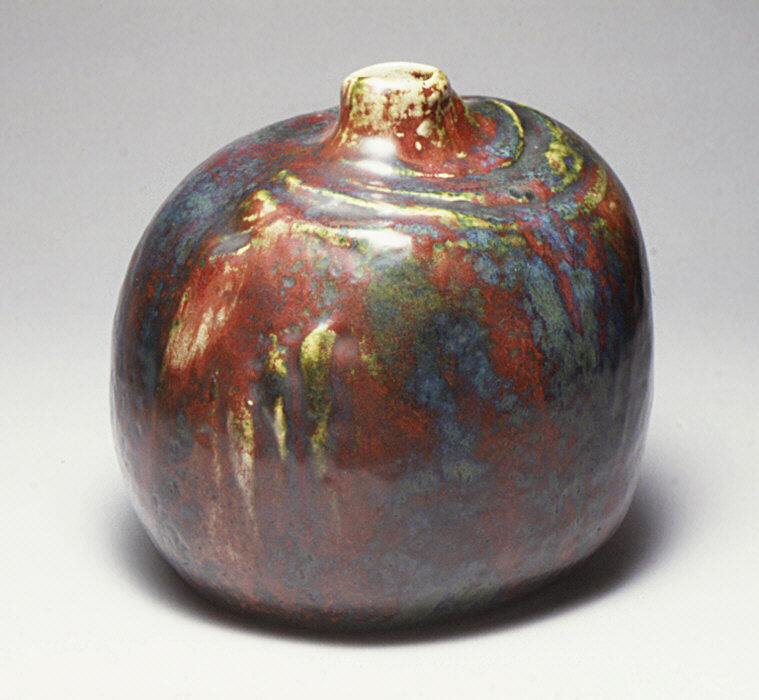
Vase, 1897

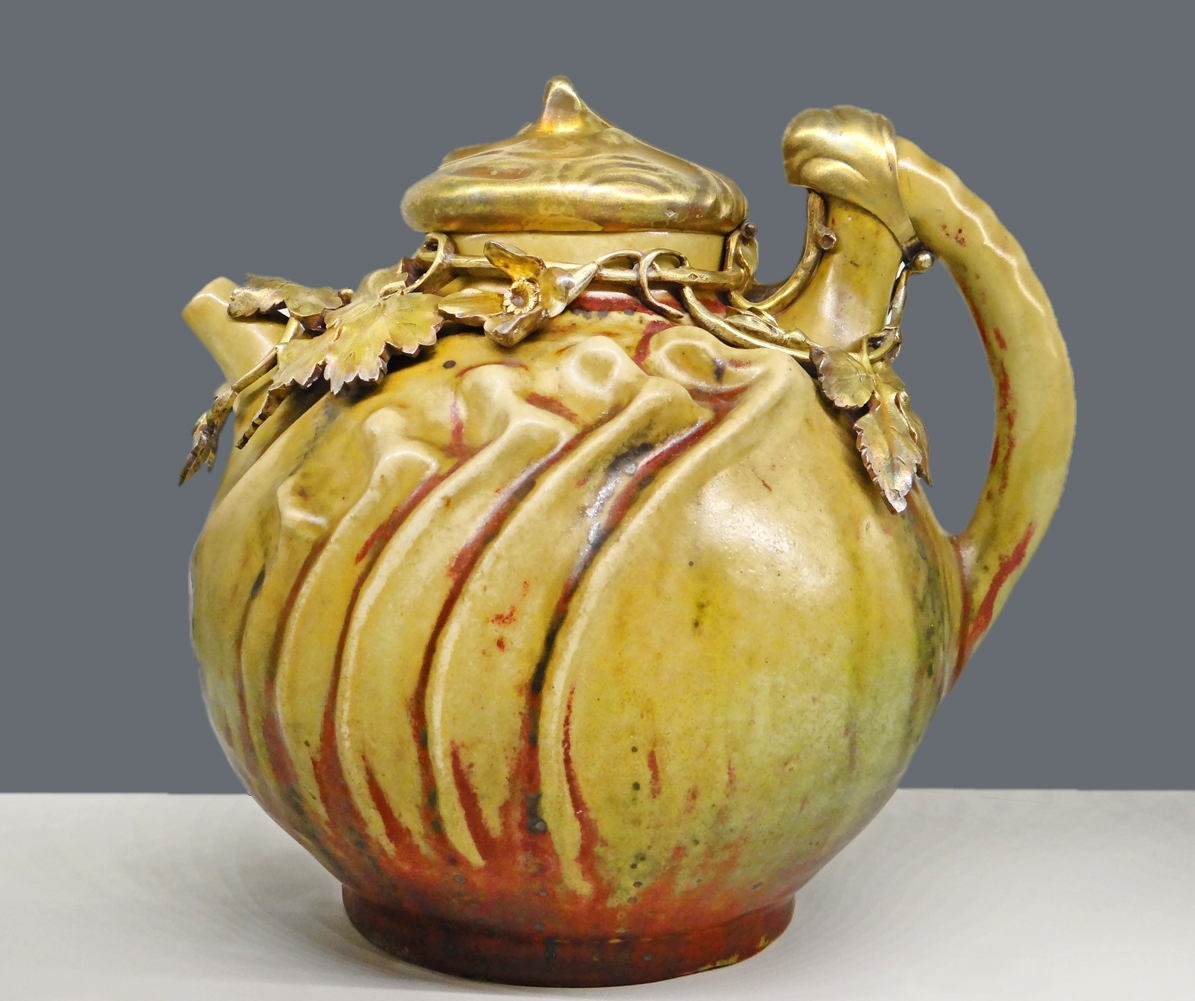
teapot with silver-gilt mounts, including hinged lid, by 1898

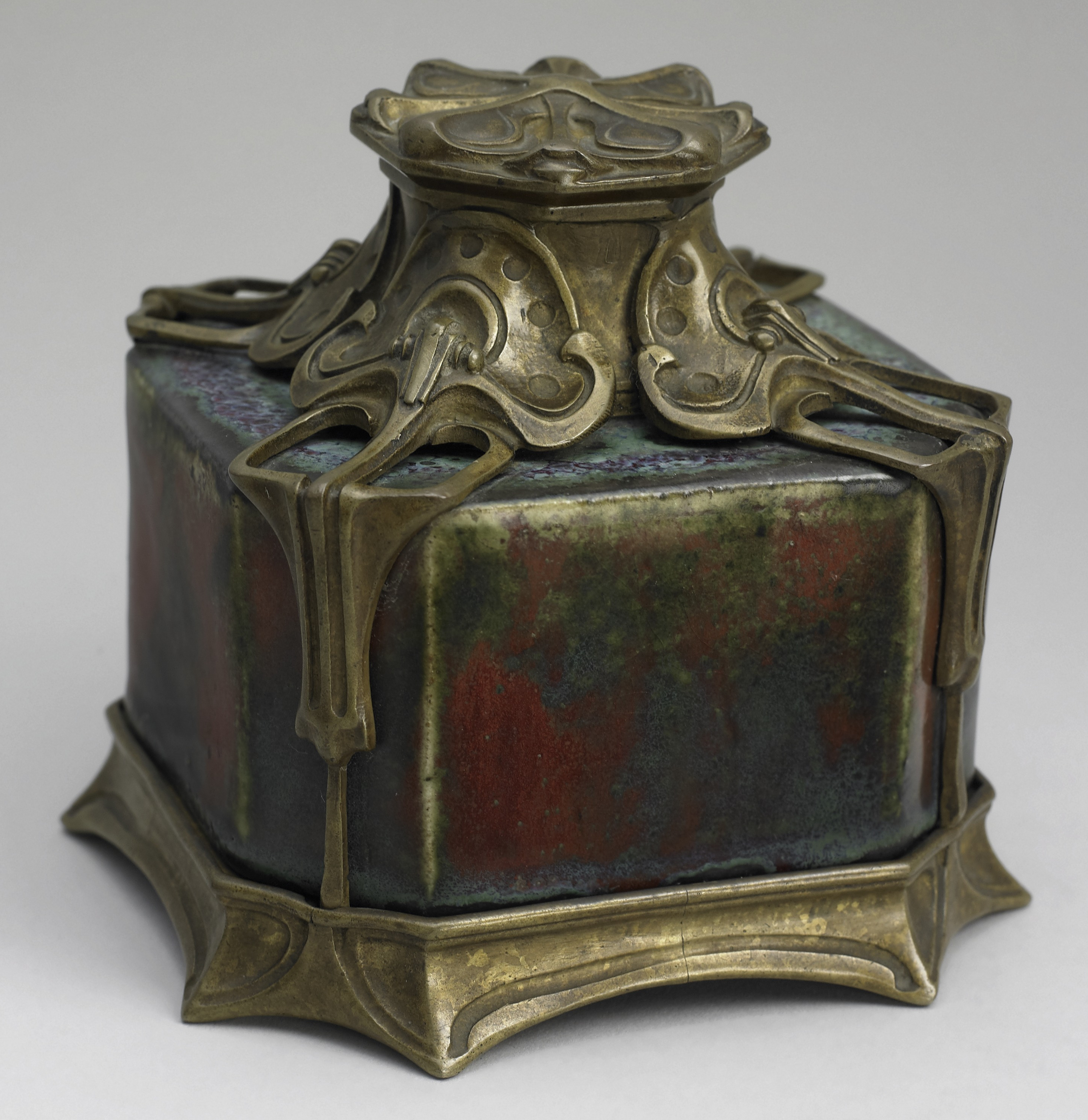
Inkwell in stoneware & gilt-bronze mounts, 1890s

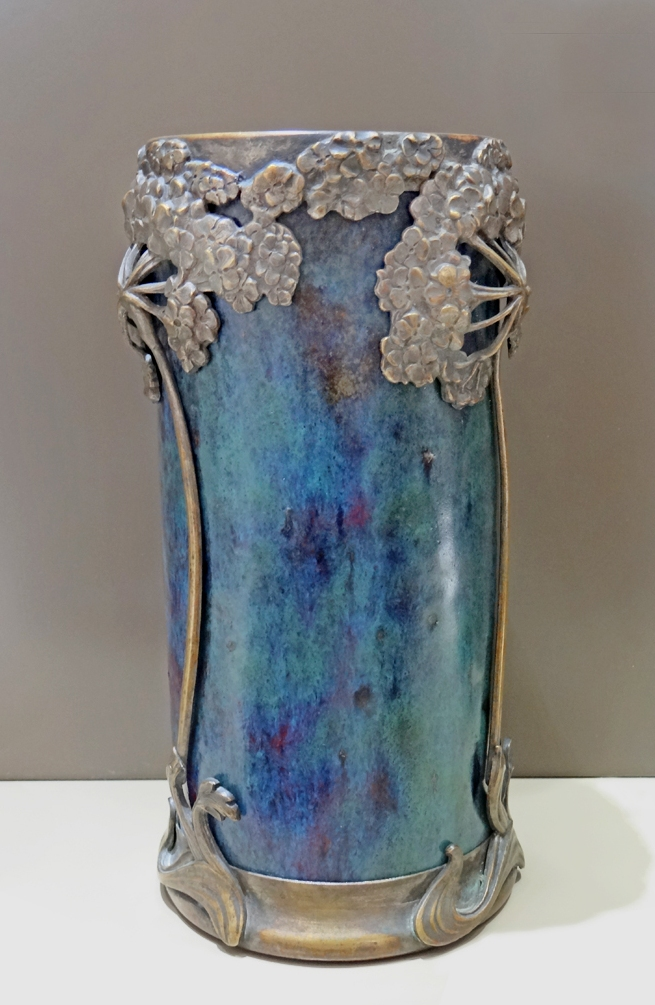
Vase, c. 1900, with silver-gilt mounts

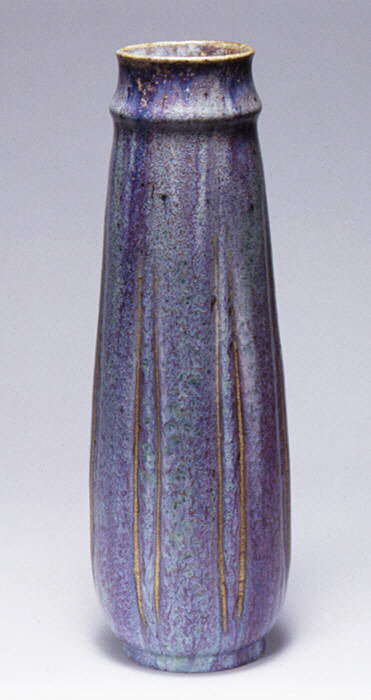
Tall vase, c. 1900

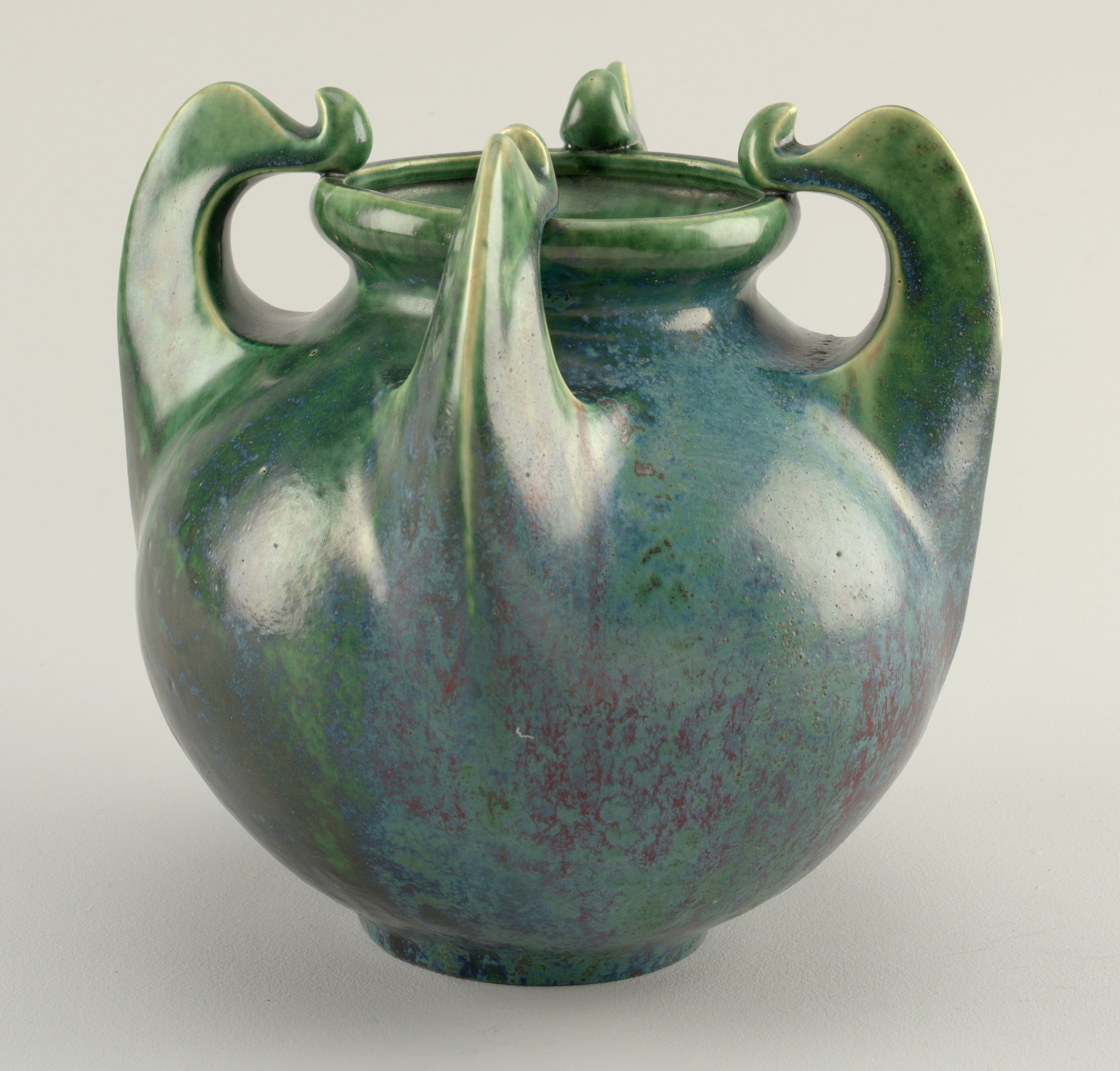
Vase, c. 1900

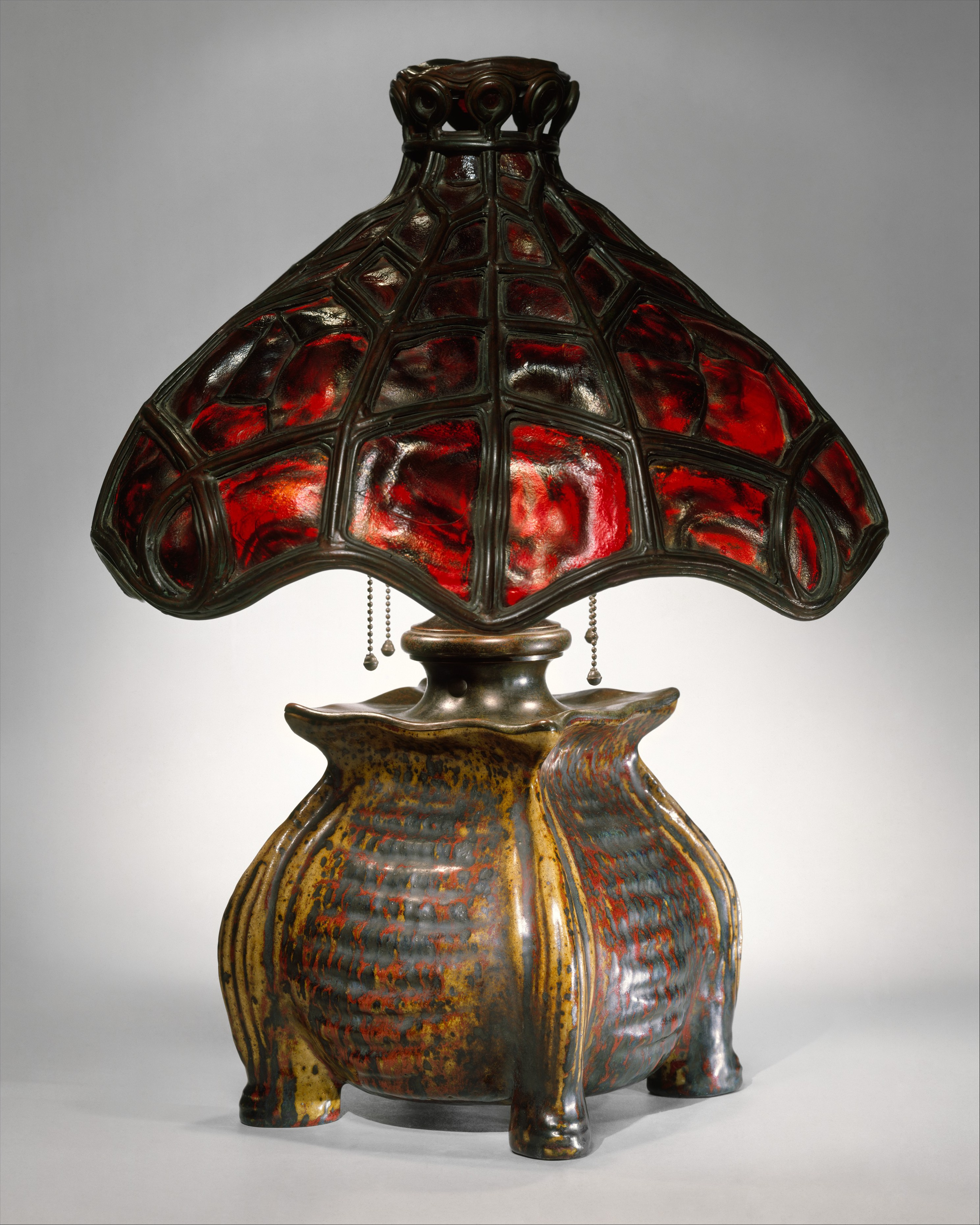
Table lamp, with glass and metal shade by Tiffany & Co., by 1902.

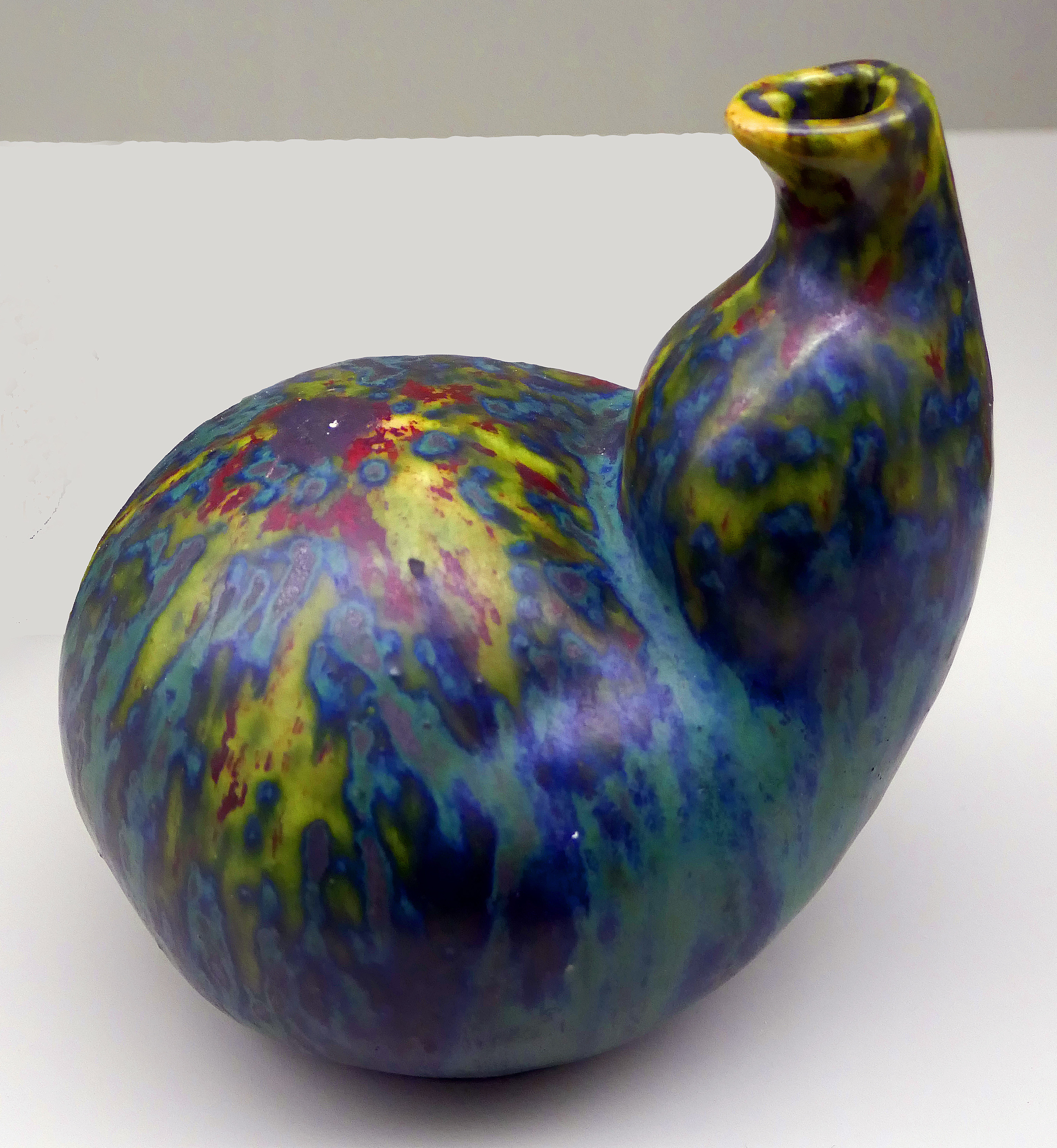
Vase, 1904

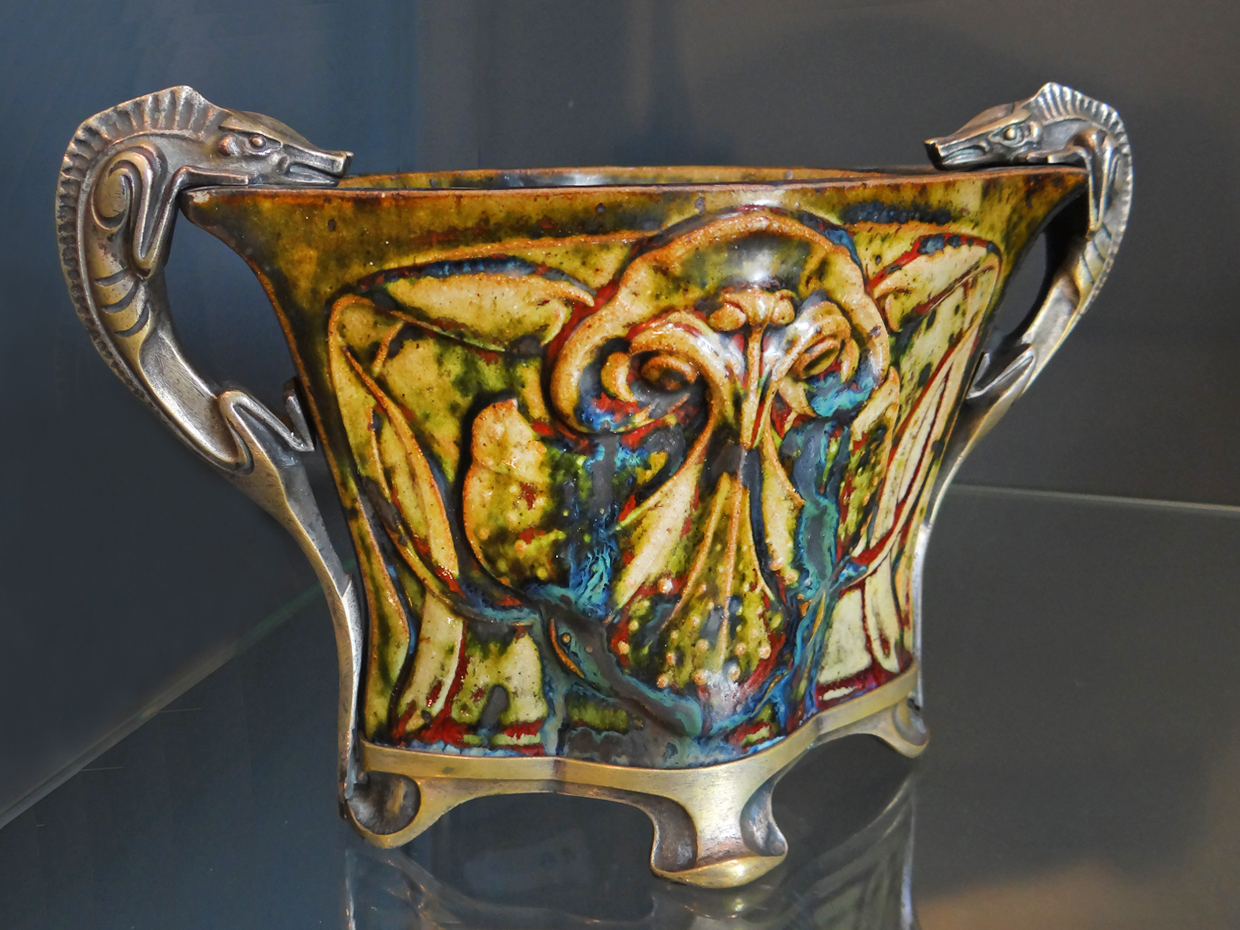
Jardinière with bronze lizard handles

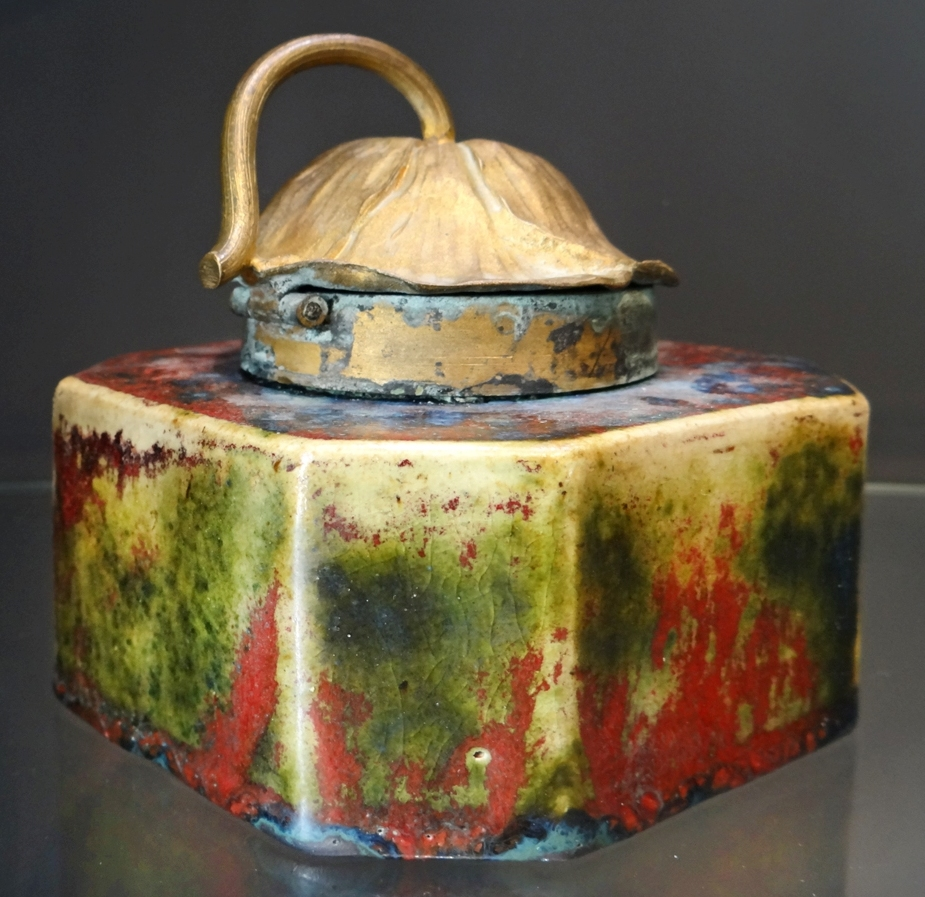
Inkwell with metal cover

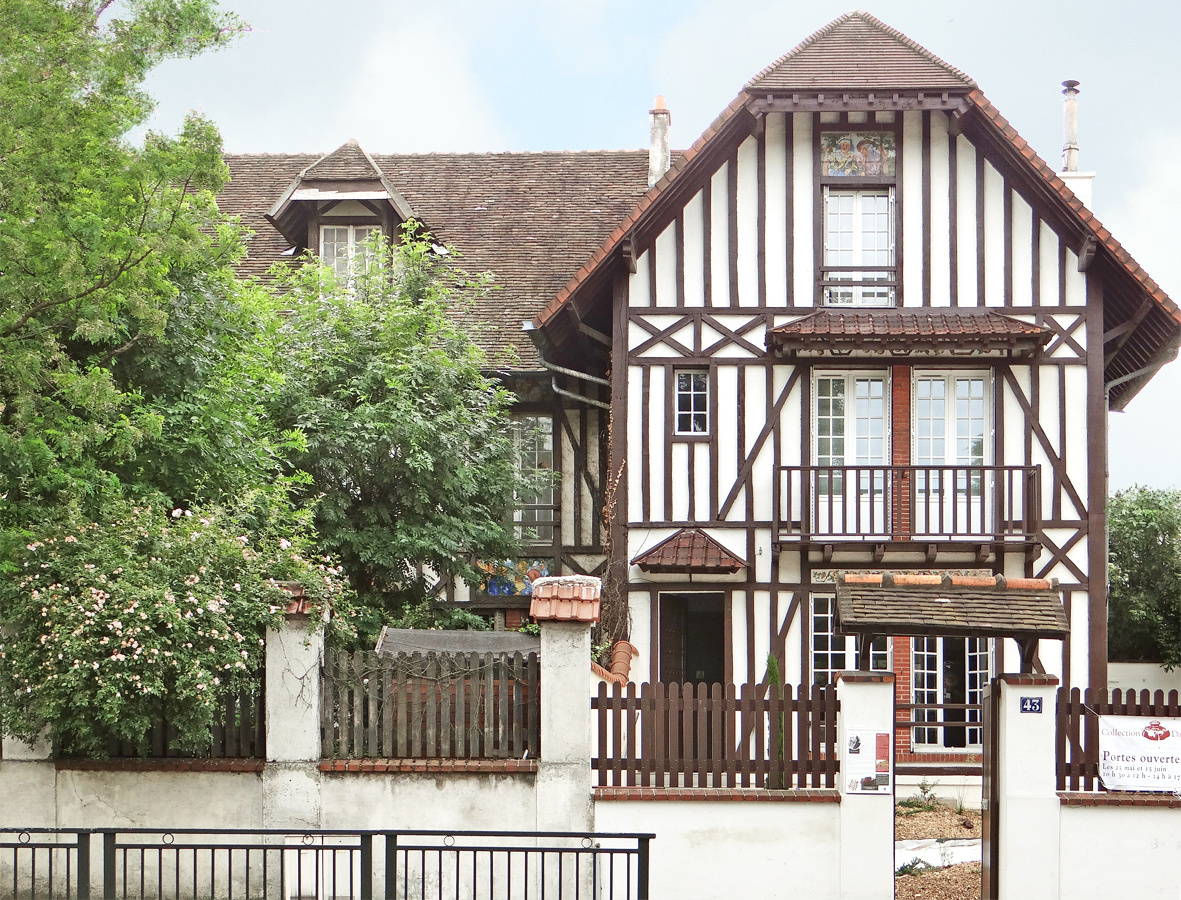
Dalpayrat's house, Bourg-la-Reine, now a museum
