= Suzanne Lacore =

French politician

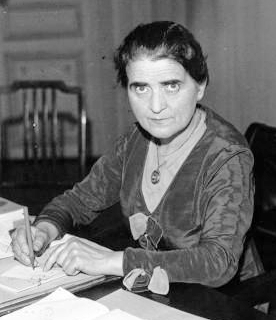
- Suzanne Lacore in 1936

Undersecretary of state for Public Health Responsible for child protection in France
- In office 5 June 1936 – 21 June 1937
- President: Albert Lebrun
- Preceded by: Louis Nicolle; Indirectly
- Succeeded by: Marc Rucart; Indirectly

Personal details
- Born: 30 May 1875 Beyssac
- Died: 6 November 1975 (age 100)

Suzanne Lacore was a French politician representing the SFIO (French Section of the Workers' International). She was born on 30 May 1875 in Beyssac (Corrèze, France); she died on 6 November 1975 in Milhac d'Auberoche (Dordogne, France) at the age of 100.

== Childhood and education ==
Suzanne Lacore was born to a rather well-off family. In 1887, she was sent to a boarding school run by nuns, preparing girls to the Brevet élémentaire ((French), approximately equivalent to the present British "GCSE" (General Certificate of Secondary Education) / Scottish "Standard Grade"), while giving them a substantial catholic education. Having passed this examination, she then passed in the competitive entrance examination for the École normale d'institutrices ((French), a school specifically intended to educate future primary school teachers), where she studied for three years (1891–1894) and passed the Brevet supérieur.

== Career ==
In early life, Suzanne Lacore was a teacher (as of 1894) and, later – uninterruptedly until she retired (in 1930) –, head teacher of a primary school in the Dordogne. She managed her political activities alongside her teaching career.

She became a militant socialist in 1906. At that time, she was the only woman in her area to be a member of a political party. She was leader of the Comité national des femmes socialistes ((French) "National committee of socialist women") and wrote articles for local, regional and national newspapers.

On 4 June 1936 she became one of three women ministers in the Front populaire ((French) "Popular Front"), along with Cécile Brunschvicg and Irène Joliot-Curie, at a time when women could neither vote nor be elected. She was appointed Under-Secretary of State for Child Protection in Léon Blum's first government, reporting to Henri Sellier; Alice Jouenne served as Lacore's chef de Cabinet. She remained in office until June 21, 1937.

During her tenure, in addition to a reform of the Assistance Publique ((French) "Social care for abandoned children"), Suzanne Lacore, as a Minister, thought up a comprehensive set of measures relating to deficient children, deprived children, and to leisure. She instituted the visiteuses sociales ((French) "female social visitors") and training courses for young female workers. She also took measures to give support to abandoned children.

Afterwards, Suzanne continued to publish booklets, to write newspaper articles and to make speeches. In particular, she stressed the benefits of nursery schools, demonstrating why it was important for a child to be educated from an early age. Her last book was published when she was 75. There are several streets, schools and nurseries named after her in France.

== Personal commitments ==
All her life, Suzanne Lacore campaigned for women and children's rights. In her speeches and newspaper articles, and in several books (see below), she expounded her socialist ideas as regards equality between women and men

"The complete liberation of women remains, in our mind, subjected to the revolutionary solution that will emancipate the workers' proletariat"

"The inferiority of women is a man-made concept; it is not the echo of a natural law."

and child protection. Her efforts at improving the condition of juvenile offenders laid the foundations for the abolition, in 1945, of the maisons de correction ((French) literally "correction houses"), tough juvenile institutions where children were treated cruelly. She used to say :

"The guilty one is not the child. The guilty one is society who has not given the child (who has often been mistreated) the help he/she needs".

Assessing the causes of wars, she came to the conclusion that "war is the inevitable outcome of the capitalist organization."

== Partial bibliography ==
- Books / Booklets

Socialisme et féminisme, Éditions de l'Équité, Paris, 1914 – Femmes socialistes, Éditions de la SFIO, Paris, 1932 – La Femme dans l'agriculture, Cahiers des "Amis de Jacquou le Croquant", Paris, 1938 – L'Émancipation de la Femme, "Les Cahiers de la Démocratie", Éditions de la Perfrac, Paris and Limoges, 1945 – Enfance d'abord !, Éditions Fanlac, 1960

- Press articles in (among other local, departmental and regional newspapers) :

Le Travailleur du Périgord, 1906-1907 – Le Populaire du Périgord, 1930-1932 – Le Travailleur du Centre, 1908-1914 – Le Populaire du Centre, 1908-1914 – Le Populaire de Paris, 1927-1931 – La Tribune des Femmes socialistes, 1936-1939 – Le Vétéran socialiste, 1949–1963

== Sources ==
- This article was abridged and translated from its counterpart on the French Wikipedia on 23 February 2011.
- Suzanne Lacore, biographie 1875–1975, by Bernard Dougnac, Éditions Fanlac, Institut Aquitain d'Études Sociales.
