= Pierre Bonnier =

French otologist

Pierre Bonnier (16 August 1861 in Templeuve – 22 March 1918 in Paris) was a French otologist. He was the brother of architect Louis Bonnier (1856–1946).

He studied medicine in Paris, and in 1897 began work as an assistant in the medical clinic of the Hôtel-Dieu in Paris. In 1901 he was named president of Société d’Otologie et de Laryngologie de Paris. He was a member of the Institut Psychologique (from 1902) and the Société de Neurologie (from 1903).

He specialized in research of auditory and vestibular systems and their disorders. The eponymous "Bonnier syndrome" is a syndrome characterized by deafness, ocular disturbances and other symptoms due to a lesion of the nucleus of Deiters. Around 1905 he introduced the term aschématie (aschematia) for a group of symptoms indicated by an inadequate account of the space occupied by some part of the body.

== Selected works ==
- Vertige, 1894 – Vertigo.
- L'oreille, 1896 – The ear.
- L'audition, 1901 – Hearing.
- Le sens des attitudes, 1904 – Sensory dispositions.
- La voix, sa culture physiologique; théorie nouvelle de la phonation, 1907 – The voice, its physiological culture (new theory of phonation).
- L'action directe sur les centres nerveux: centrothérapie, 1913 – Direct action on the nerve centers, centrotherapy.
- Défense organique et centres nerveux, 1914 – Organic defense and nerve centers.
