= L'Art Nouveau =

L'Art Nouveau may refer to:

- Art Nouveau, an art movement between about 1890 and 1905
- Maison de l'Art Nouveau, an art gallery opened by Siegfried Bing
