= Louis Bonnier =

French architect

Louis Bernard Bonnier
- Bonnier in 1925 by Laure Albin Guillot
- Born: 14 June 1856; Templeuve, Nord, France
- Died: 16 September 1946 (aged 90); Paris, France
- Occupation: Architect
- Known for: Paris urban planning

Louis Bernard Bonnier (14 June 1856 – 16 September 1946) was a French architect known for his work as an urban planner for the city of Paris. He was instrumental in loosening the restrictions on the appearance of buildings in Paris, which resulted in the blossoming of Art Nouveau buildings. He designed many significant buildings himself, including private villas, public housing and railway buildings. In all his work he was true to the rationalist principles of Art Nouveau.

== Life ==
=== Early years: 1856–86 ===
Louis Bernard Bonnier was born on 14 June 1856 in Templeuve, Nord. The Bonnier family were originally laborers. Louis Bonnier was the son of a notary's clerk who later became manager of a sugar factory and then a wine salesman. Louis's father was a committed Republican. Louis was the oldest of four boys. His brothers were Charles (1803–1926), Pierre Bonnier (1861–1918) and Jules (1859–1908). Jules Bonnier became a well-known biologist.

Bonnier studied painting and architecture at the École académique de Lille. He was admitted to the École nationale supérieure des Beaux-Arts in Paris in 1877, where he was a pupil of André Moyaux and Louis-Jules André. Bonnier married Isabelle Deconchy on 25 April 1881. She was the sister of his friend Ferdinand Deconchy, a painter, and daughter of a well-known architect. They had three sons. Jean (1882–1966) was a painter and decorator, Jacques (1884–1964) was an architect and Marc (1887–1916) was an aviator. Louis Bonnier graduated from the École des Beaux-Arts in 1886.

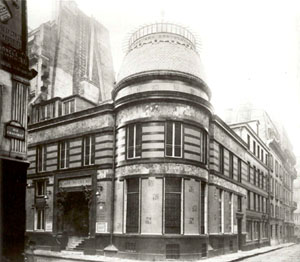
Maison de l'Art Nouveau (1895)

=== Pre-war career: 1886–1914 ===
Examples of Bonnier's early work were four houses he designed in Ambleteuse, Nord (1892), the Hôtel de Ville (town hall) in Templeuve (1893) and the Flé house in Ambleteuse (1894). These illustrated his taste for rationality, economy and subordination of decoration to structure. With his work on the Hôtel de Ville at Issy-les-Moulineaux he showed his ability to discard period styles of architecture and to make use of new materials. This made his work attractive to the nouveau-riche. He was named Architect of the City of Paris in 1884.

Bonnier shared an interest in Japanese prints and stencil patterns with Siegfried Bing, and in 1895 was the main architect and designer for the renovation of Bing's shop at 22 rue de Provence in Paris, the Maison de l'Art Nouveau. Bing had first asked Victor Horta for plans, but had rejected them as too expensive. Bonnier designed the grillwork for the entrance to the Japanese section of the shop on Rue Chauchat, and oversaw placement of the glass cupola over the corner turret. He oversaw the decorations and architectural changes to the shop, working with artisans such as Frank Brangwyn, an English Arts and Crafts designer. The shop opened in December 1895.

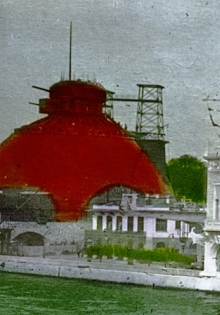
1900 Paris Exposition, Schneider Pavilion

The success of Bing's shop led to further commissions. He designed a globe based on the concept of the anarchist geographer Élisée Reclus for the Paris Exposition Universelle (1900). This was not built. He also designed the impressive Schneider Pavilion on the Quai Branly for the exposition. Schneider was the main supplier of guns and armaments, and Bonnier designed a red building situated on the bank of the Seine that resembled a huge gun turret or battery. The pavilion gained widespread press attention and consolidated Bonnier's reputation as an architect capable of innovative solutions to unusual challenges.

Bonnier was responsible for the report of the commission that reviewed the decrees regulating construction in Paris, and prepared the decree of 13 August 1902 that gave more freedom in the appearance to buildings. This allowed for new buildings in the Art Nouveau style, and for structures that let more air and light into the streets and yards. In 1910 he became director of architecture services, plantations and walks. He was also Inspector General of Architectural Technical Services and Aesthetics of the Seine, and Chief Architect for Civil Buildings and National Palaces. He was responsible for the Elysée Palace from 1901 to 1911. In 1912 he oversaw the first Habitation à bon marché (HBM) low-cost housing competition of the city of Paris, and made the first plan for expansion of Paris with Marcel Poëte.

=== Later career: 1914–46 ===
In 1916 Bonnier proposed the creation of the archaeological and artistic depository of the prefecture of the Seine. He founded the Ecole supérieure d’art public in 1917, which became the École des hautes études urbaines (EHEU) in 1919. The school taught modern urban planning concepts. It bought the journal La Vie urbaine, which Bonnier and Poëte had founded. Bonnier taught there until 1924, when the EHEU became the Urban Planning Institute of the University of Paris. Bonnier built the Butte-aux-Cailles swimming pool (1920–23), and a group of HMB buildings in Ménilmontant (1920–25). From 1920 he was consulting architect to the PLM Railway Company, and supervised or directed construction of new stations and hotel accommodations. His last task before retiring was to manage the architecture services and works for the Exposition Internationale des Arts Décoratifs of 1925. His work was part of the architecture event in the art competition at the 1928 Summer Olympics.

He died in Paris in 1946.

== Style ==
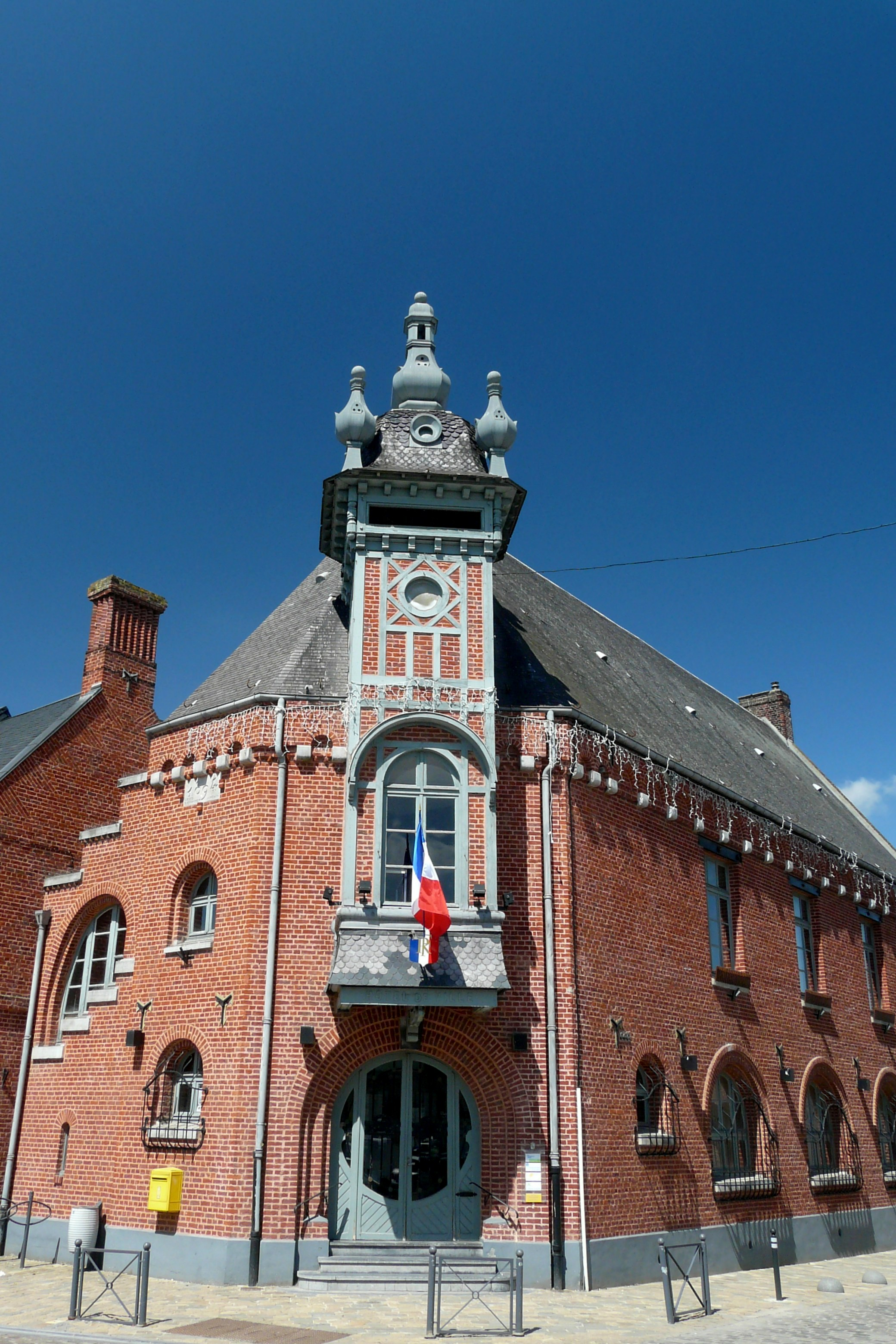
Town hall of Templeuve, Nord

Bonnier and Henri Sauvage were two of the main figures in the transition from Art nouveau to modern architecture. Throughout his career Bonnier was true to the principles of imaginative eclecticism that are one of the foundations of Art Nouveau, rejecting the stricter schools of French classical architecture in favour of more picturesque ornamentation, especially when it emphasizes and explains the structure of the building. Charles Plumet praised Bonnier, who he thought had carefully adapted forms to contexts and needs.

== Major works ==
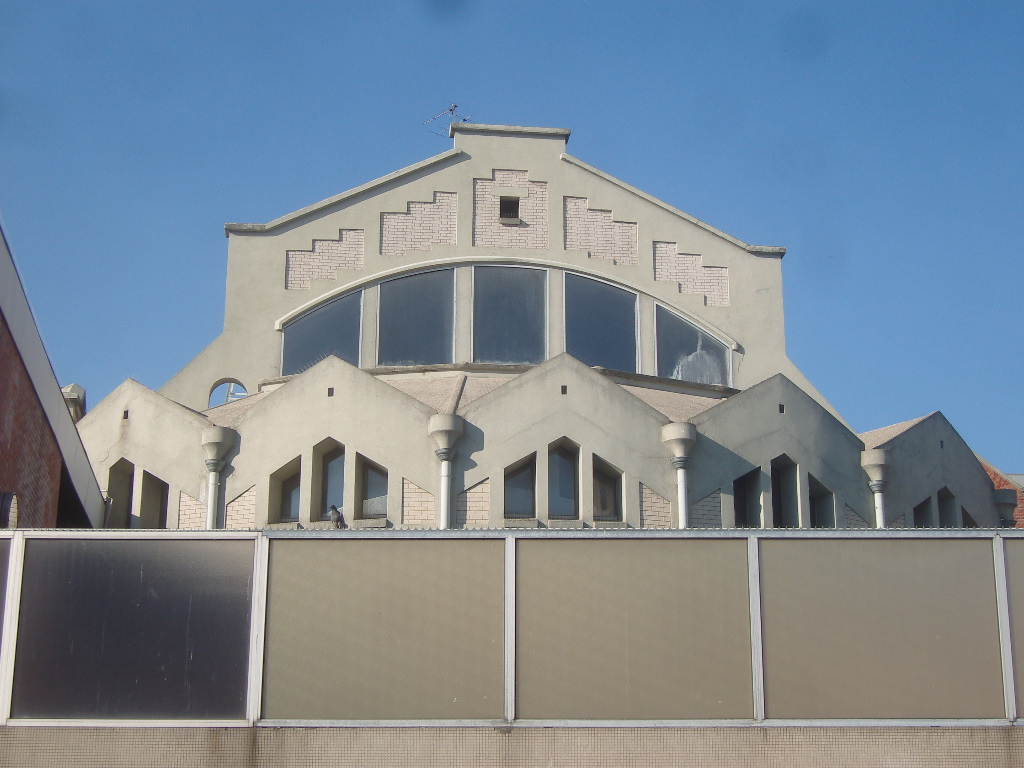
Butte-aux-Cailles swimming pool

- 1890–92 Four villas in Ambleteuse, Pas-de-Calais: "Les Sablons", "Les Oyats", "The Dunes" and "Les Algues"
- 1893–94 Villa Georges Flé (now called Robinson villa), 47 Chemin Lock, Ambleteuse, Pas-de-Calais
- 1893–94 Town hall of Templeuve, Nord
- 1895 Town hall of Issy-les-Moulineaux, now in Hauts-de-Seine
- 1895 Maison de l'Art Nouveau (Bing hotel) with Frank Brangwyn for Siegfried Bing, 22 rue de Provence, Paris 9 e .
- 1897 Outbuildings of the "Cap-Horn" château, Outreau, Pas-de-Calais
- 1897–1913 Hôtel de voyageurs, Aubengue, Wimille, Pas-de-Calais
- 1898–99 Marine Zoology Laboratory, Pointe aux Oies, Wimereux, Pas-de-Calais (destroyed in 1942)
- 1900 Schneider Pavilion and Administration Building of the General Commission for the Paris Exposition Universelle (1900)
- 1900 Villa "La Bégude" Cagnes-sur-Mer, now in Alpes-Maritimes
- 1902 Residential building for Maurice Lonquéty, 58 rue de Londres, Paris 9th
- 1902–03 Villa "La Colinette" Essômes-sur-Marne, Aisne
- 1903–04 Dispensary of Jouye-Rouve et Tanies, 190 Rue des Pyrénées and Rue Stendhal, Paris 20th
- 1903–26 Town house of Maurice Lonquéty, 16 Place Malesherbes and 4 Montchanin street, Paris 17th
- 1904–07 Villa of André Gide, Avenue des Sycomores, Villa Montmorency, Paris 16 th
- 1905 Monument to commander Amédée-François Lamy, Mougins, Alpes-Maritimes
- 1908 Villa Lahovary, Leordeni, Romania
- 1909 7 storey house at 122–124 Rue du Faubourg Saint-Martin, Paris 10th
- 1910 Villa "Le Casal" Cagnes-sur-Mer, now in Alpes-Maritimes

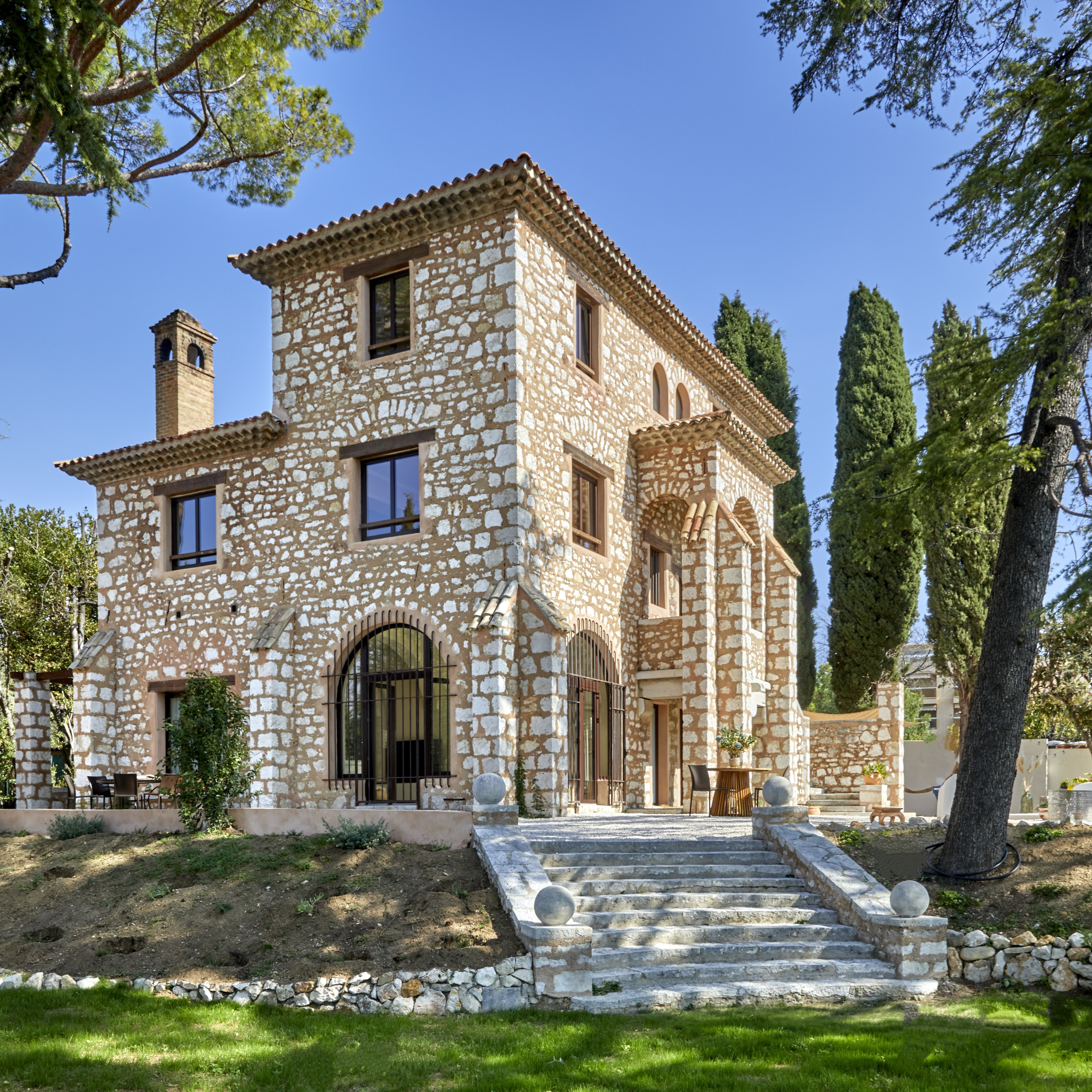
Villa Le Casal in Cagnes-sur-Mer

- 1910–11 School buildings, Rue Rouelle, Paris 15th
- 1910–18 Machat house, 38 Brissart street Clamart, Hauts-de-Seine
- 1910–30 Butte-aux-Cailles swimming pool, 5 Place Paul Verlaine, Paris 13th
- 1911 Villa "Le Rousset", 19 Franklin D. Roosevelt Avenue in Le Lavandou, Var
- 1911–13 Small rental house, 67 Rue Millers, Paris 12th
- 1912 Hotel de la Pointe-aux-Geese, Aubengue, Wimille, Pas-de-Calais
- 1919–23 Reconstruction of La Tournelle bridge, Paris 4 th and 5th
- 1920–28 Ménilmontant low-income housing group, 140 rue de Ménilmontant, Paris 20th
- 1922–25 PLM Memorial, hall of the Paris-Gare de Lyon, Paris 12th.
- 1923–25 Grand Hotel du Mont Blanc for PLM, Combloux, Haute-Savoie
- 1924 Railway Station, Saint-Laurent-du-Var, Alpes-Maritimes
- 1926 May farm, Morienval, Oise
- 1926 Café, Gare de Marseille-Saint-Charles, Marseille
- 1926–33 PLM Station Hotel, Briançon, Hautes-Alpes
- 1926–33 PLM Station Hotel, Marseille
- 1927 Villa of doctor Got, Pornichet, now in Loire-Atlantique
- 1929–32 Houses for executives of PLM, 7 rue de Rambouillet, Paris 12th
- 1932 Station buffet at the Gare de Marseille-Saint-Charles, Marseille

== Publications ==
Publications include:

- Louis Bonnier; Paul Dubois; Albert Kaempfen; Gustave Larroumet (1902). Georges-Ernest Coquart, architecte du Gouvernement, membre de l'Institut, chevalier de la Légion d'honneur, 1831-1902; Notice sur la vie et ses oeuvres (in French). Paris: E. Ducher, éditeur. p. 20.
- Louis Bonnier (1903). Conférences faites dans l'hémicycle de l'École nationale des beaux-arts, les 22 et 29 octobre 1902, sur les règlements de voirie, par Louis Bonnier,... 1. Les décrets antérieurs; les réglementations étrangères. II. Le décret du 13 août 1902 (in French). Paris: C. Schmid. p. 93.
- Louis Bonnier; Paul Juillerat (1907–1908). Rapport à M. le préfet sur les enquêtes effectuées... dans les maisons signalées comme foyers de tuberculose (in French). Vol. 1–2. Paris: impr. de Chaix. p. 6.
- Louis Bonnier (1910). Préfecture du département de la Seine. Direction administrative des services d'architecture et des promenades et plantations. Aspect de Paris. Mémoire de M. le préfet de la Seine au Conseil municipal. [Rapport sur la place des Victoires, par M. Louis Bonnier.] (in French). Paris: Impr. municipale. p. 15.
- Louis Bonnier (1913). A propos d'un groupe scolaire par Louis Bonnier,... (in French). Paris: Librairie centrale des Beaux-Arts. p. 15.
- Louis Bonnier (1925). La Piscine de la Butte-aux-Cailles (in French). Paris: A. Levy. p. 12.

== Sources ==
- Bonnier, Charles; Candar, Gilles (2001). Les souvenirs de Charles Bonnier. Presses Univ. Septentrion. ISBN 978-2-85939-634-3.
- Dion, Mathilde (1991). "LOUIS BONNIER (1856-1946)" (PDF). Notices biographiques d'architectes français (in French). Paris: Ifa/Archives d’architecture du XXe siècle.
- "Fonds Bonnier, Louis (1856-1946)". Archiwebture (in French). Ministère de la culture et de la communication: Cité de l'architecture et du patrimoine. Archived from the original on 2015-12-10.
- "Louis Bonnier (1856-1946) - Auteur du texte". BnF.
- "Louis Bonnier". L'art nouveau.
- Meganck, Leen; Santvoort, Linda Van; Meyer, Jan de (2013). Regionalism and Modernity: Architecture in Western Europe, 1914-1940. Universitaire Pers Leuven. ISBN 978-90-5867-918-5.
- Weisberg, Gabriel P.; Menon, Elizabeth K. (2013-09-05). Art Nouveau: A Research Guide for Design Reform in France, Belgium, England, and the United States. Routledge. ISBN 978-1-135-02313-3.
