= Hôtel de Ville, Issy-les-Moulineaux =

Town hall in Issy-les-Moulineaux, France

Hôtel de Ville
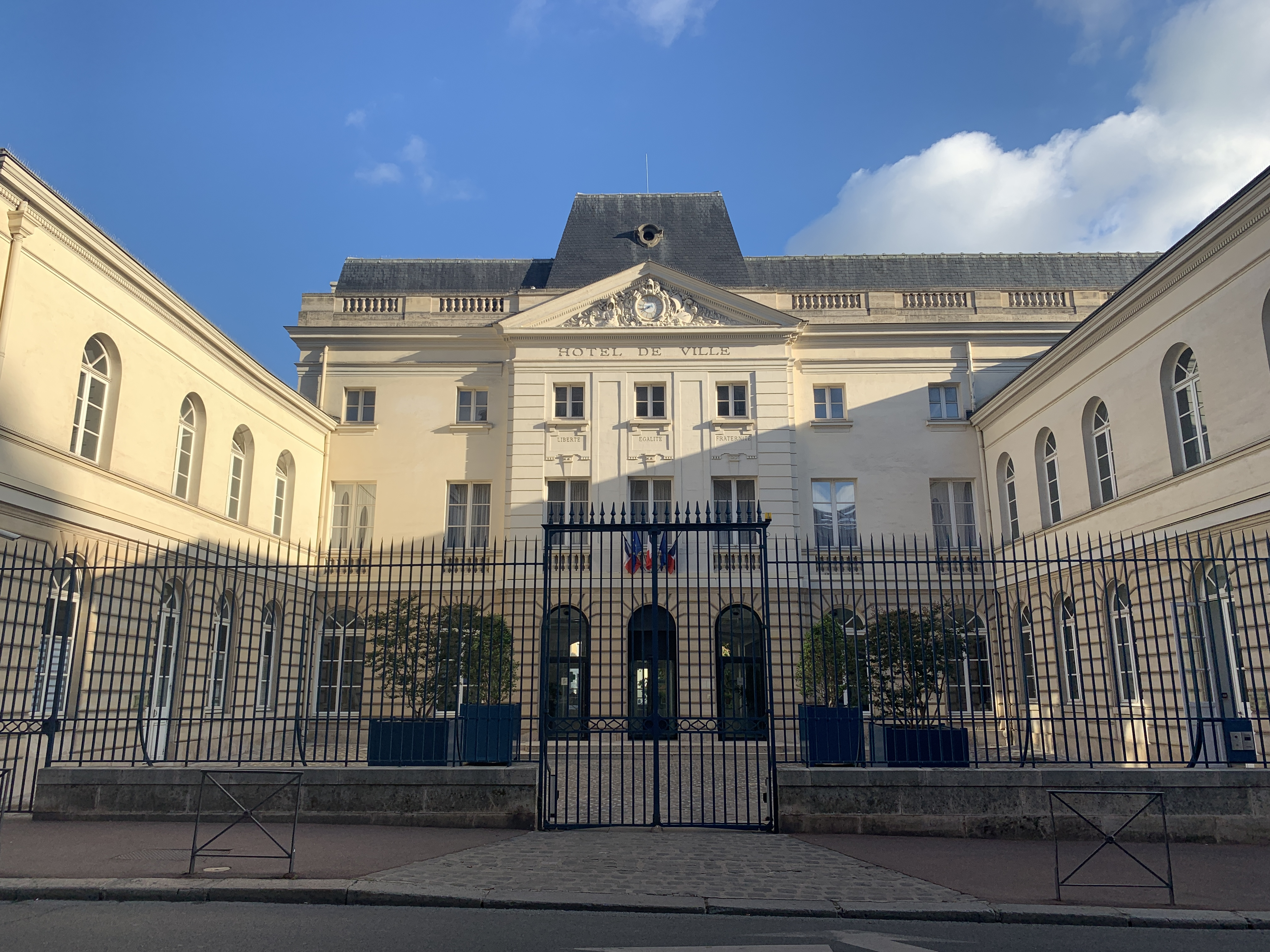
- The main frontage of the Hôtel de Ville in June 2020

General information
- Type: City hall
- Architectural style: Neoclassical style
- Location: Issy-les-Moulineaux, France
- Coordinates: 48.8245°N 2.2737°E
- Completed: 1895

Design and construction
- Architect: Louis Bonnier

The Hôtel de Ville (French pronunciation: [otɛl də vil], City Hall) is a municipal building in Issy-les-Moulineaux, Hauts-de-Seine, in the southwestern suburbs of Paris, standing on Rue du Général Leclerc.

== History ==
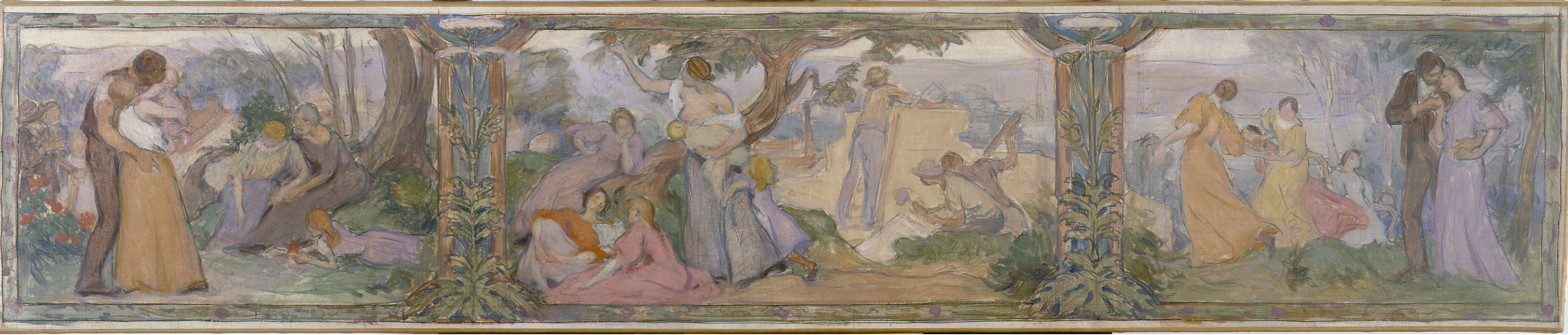
"La Vie" by Victor Prouvé

Following the French Revolution, the new town council met in the house of the mayor at the time. This arrangement continued until the mid-18th century when the council led by the mayor, Pierre-François-Louis Estienne, decided to commission a town hall on Place Voltaire. It was designed by Claude Naissant in the Italianate style, built in ashlar stone and was completed in 1863. The design involved a symmetrical main frontage of five bays facing onto Place Voltaire. The central bay featured a porch with a round headed opening and a keystone. It was fenestrated with rounded headed windows on the first floor and in the other bays on the ground floor. At roof level, there was a panel containing a clock surmounted by a triangular pediment, and there was a small belfry behind the clock.

In late 19th century, after the commune expanded to the west, the council led by the mayor, Henri-Oscar Mayer, decided to acquire a more substantial building more to the centre of the enlarged area. The building they selected had been commissioned by the banker, Nicolas Beaujon. It was a typical hôtel particulier with a grand gate, a grand courtyard and two ornate façades. It was designed by Étienne-Louis Boullée in the neoclassical style, built in ashlar stone and was completed in the mid-18th century. It became the annex of the Couvent de Notre-Dame des Oiseaux (Convent of Notre-Dame des Oiseaux) in 1837. The building was acquired from the Langlet family for FFr 185,000 and, after being converted for municipal use to a design by Louis Bonnier, it was officially re-opened by the minister for public works, Ludovic Dupuy-Dutemps, on 13 October 1895.

The layout involved a three-storey main building at the back of the main courtyard, with a two-storey wing on either side and an iron railing at the front, facing southeast onto Rue Ernest Rehan (now Rue du Général Leclerc). The central section of three bays, which was slightly projected forward, featured three round headed openings with a rusticated surround on the ground floor, three casement windows with balustrades on the first floor and three small square windows on the second floor, all flanked by pilasters supporting an entablature and a modillioned pediment with a clock and some ornate carvings in the tympanum. The two outer bays were fenestrated in a similar style, while the wings were fenestrated with round headed windows on both floors. The building was extended to the northeast along Rue Ernest Rehan creating two more internal courtyards. Internally, the principal room was the Salle des Mariages (wedding room), which featured a painting by Victor Prouvé entitled "La Vie".

In 1942, during the Second World War, a French Resistance group known as the "Mouvement de Libération Nationale" was secretly established in the town hall. The group worked hard to undermine the German forces of occupation and then seized the building on 19 August 1944, during the Paris Insurrection, shortly before the liberation of the town by the French 2nd Armoured Division, commanded by General Philippe Leclerc, on 26 August 1944.

A war memorial, created by the sculptor, Jean Joachim, intended to commemorate the lives of members of the French Liberation Army and the French Forces of the Interior who died in the Second World War, as well as other people transported to their deaths in concentration camps, was unveiled in the park behind the town hall in 1959. A bust, created by the sculptor, Maïrée Mannick, depicting Leclerc, was unveiled in the same park in 1989.

Following an extensive refurbishment, which involved the creation of the Salle Multimedia (multimedia room) with high-definition video projection capabilities, the building was officially reopened by the mayor, André Santini, on 22 June 1994.
