= Beyssac =

- Commune
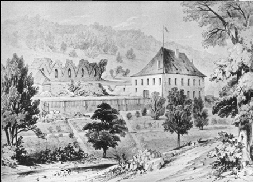
- The former Charterhouse of Glandier

- Coat of arms
- Location of Beyssac
- Location within France Location within Nouvelle-Aquitaine
- Coordinates: 45°21′54″N 1°24′07″E
- Country: France
- Region: Nouvelle-Aquitaine
- Department: Corrèze
- Arrondissement: Brive-la-Gaillarde
- Canton: Uzerche

Government
  - Mayor (2020–2026): Serge Langlade
- Area^{1}: 21.34 km^{2} (8.24 sq mi)
- Highest elevation: 432 m (1,417 ft)
- Lowest elevation: 215 m (705 ft)
- Population (2023): 481
  - Density: 22.5/km^{2} (58.4/sq mi)
- Time zone: UTC+01:00 (CET)
  - Summer (DST): UTC+02:00 (CEST)
- INSEE/Postal code: 19024 /19230
- ^{1} French Land Register data, which excludes lakes, ponds, glaciers > 1 km^{2} (0.386 sq mi or 247 acres) and river estuaries.

Beyssac (French pronunciation: [bɛsak]; Occitan: Baissac) is a commune of the Corrèze department in central France.

== Population ==
Historical population
Year	Pop.	±% p.a.
1968	843	—
1975	766	−1.36%
1982	827	+1.10%
1990	811	−0.24%
1999	727	−1.21%
2007	761	+0.57%
2012	670	−2.51%
2017	615	−1.70%
2023	481	−4.01%
Source: INSEE

== Personalities ==
Beyssac was the birthplace of Étienne Aubert (1282 or 1295–1362), who became pope as Pope Innocent VI, and of Suzanne Lacore – born Marie Lacore – (1875-1975).

== See also ==
- Communes of the Corrèze department
