= Marcel Poëte =

French librarian and historian

Marcel César Poëte
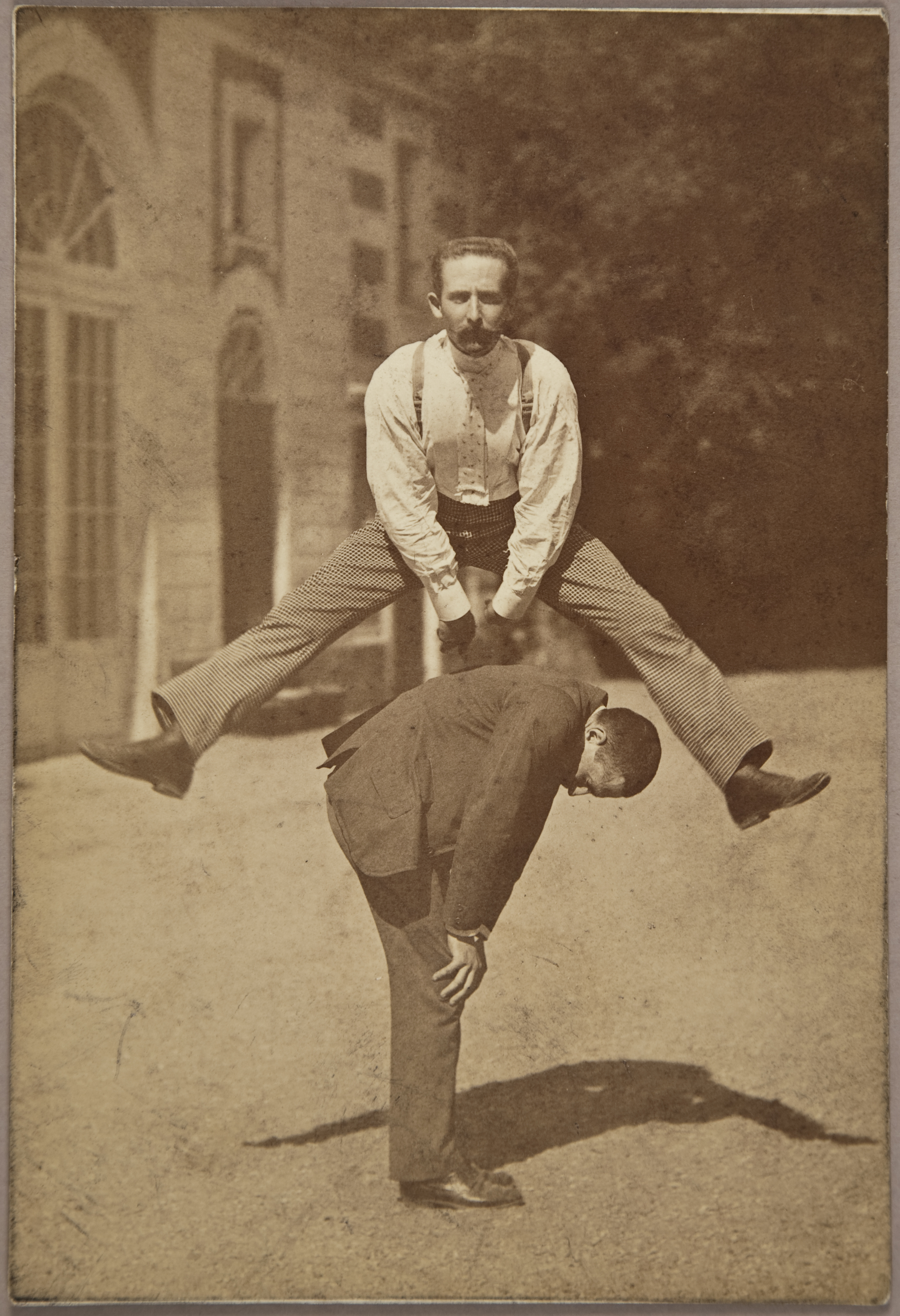
- Poëte (above) playing leapfrog with Elie Debidour in October 1914
- Born: 10 October 1866; Rougemont, Doubs, France
- Died: 14 April 1950 (aged 83); Paris, France
- Occupation(s): Librarian, historian, urbanist

Marcel César Poëte (10 October 1866 – 14 April 1950) was a French librarian, historian and urban planning theoretician. He was a co-founder of the School of Advanced Urban Studies, where he taught, and was highly influential in developing new theories of urban planning in Paris in the first half of the 20th century.

== Life ==
Marcel César Poëte was born in Rougemont, Doubs, on 10 October 1866. He studied at the École Nationale des Chartes (class of 1890) and then started work in the Bourges library. He moved to Paris where he worked in the Sainte-Geneviève Library. He then became curator of the municipal library of Besançon. In 1903 he was head of the Historical Library of the City of Paris (Bibliothèque historique de la ville de Paris). To make the library more accessible to the general public he arranged exhibitions and conferences, and lectured on the history of Paris.

In 1912 Louis Bonnier and Poëte made the first plan for expansion of Paris. In 1916 Poëte decided to convert the library into the Institute of History, Geography and Urban Economy of the city of Paris (Institut d’histoire, de géographie et d’économie urbaine de la Ville de Paris). With help from this Institute and the Seine department Poëte, Bonnier and Henri Sellier co-founded the School of Advanced Urban Studies (École des hautes études urbaines, EHEU). The EHEU was launched in 1918. Poëte and Bonnier launched the review La Vie Urbaine in 1919.

Poëte held the chair of the History Seminar at the École pratique des hautes études and was secretary of the Old Paris Committee. He became a member of the Musée social and joined its section on rural and urban hygiene. He was also involved in the Institute of Urbanism, the French Association of Town Planners (Société française des urbanistes), the Municipal Technicians and Hygienists Association (Association générale des hygiénistes et techniciens municipaux ) and the French Union of Local Authorities (Union des villes et communes de France). In 1937 Sellier and Poëte founded the Fédération internationale de l’habitation et de l’urbanisme (International Federation of Housing and Urban Planning). Marcel Poëte died in Paris on 14 April 1950.

== Theories ==
As a historian Poëte had little interest in the chronicles of the aristocracy, but wanted to study the growth and evolution of the city as a biologist would observe an organism growing. He prized the documents in the Historical Library as central to understanding the past of the city. He saw great value in photography, which began to be developed in the 1830s, as an objective record of the changing city. In the 1910s and 1920s Poëte developed a new discipline which he called science de la ville and Patrick Geddes called "civics." Poëte's writings about Paris and his courses at the EHEU reflect the profound influence of Henri Bergson. He adopted Bergson's vitalism and his ideas of duration and "creative evolution" in architecture and city plans as opposed to mundane functionalism.

Poëte anticipated a new phase of industrial development in Paris. He viewed a city as a living organism that constantly adapts itself to changes in the economic environment, while retaining relics of the past. He wanted to use the older structures as the basis for a city that was adapted to social needs and that could more easily adjust to industrialization. His writings are full of biological metaphors. He calls the city "a collective human being", a "living organism", with a "natural zoning" based on "the organic needs of a constantly evolving agglomeration."

== Publications ==
- Marcel Poëte (1904), Les Primitifs parisiens, étude sur la peinture et la miniature à Paris, du XIVe siècle à la Renaissance, leçons d'un cours d'introduction à l'histoire de Paris professé à la Bibliothèque de la ville (in French), Paris: H. Champion, p. 74
- Marcel Poëte (1908), L'Enfance de Paris, formation et croissance de la ville, des origines jusqu'au temps de Philippe-Auguste (in French), Paris: A. Colin, p. 287
- Edmond Beaurepaire; Étienne Clouzot; Gabriel Henriot; Marcel Poëte (1908), Paris sous la République de 1848: exposition de la Bibliothèque et des travaux historiques de la ville de Paris (in French), Paris: impr. de P. Dupont, p. 46
- Marcel Poëte (1910), Formation et évolution de Paris (in French), Paris: F. Juven, p. 184
- Étienne Clouzot; Gabriel Henriot; Marcel Poëte (1910), La transformation de Paris sous le Second Empire (in French), Paris: Bibliothèque historique de la Ville de Paris; Impr. de P. Dupont, p. 69
- Marcel Poëte (1913), La Promenade à Paris au XVIIe siècle (in French), Paris: A. Colin, p. 351
- Marcel Poëte (1916), Une première manifestation d'union sacrée. Paris devant la menace étrangère en 1636 (in French), Paris: Perrin, p. 359
- Marcel Poëte (1924), Au jardin des Tuileries. L'Art du jardin. La Promenade publique (in French), Paris: Aug. Picard, édit., p. 361
- Marcel Poëte (1924–1931), Une vie de cité. Paris, de sa naissance à nos jours... (in French), Paris: A. Picard
- Marcel Poëte; Henri Sellier (1926), Paris pendant la Guerre (in French), Paris: les Presses universitaires de France, p. 105
- Marcel Poëte (1929), Introduction à l'urbanisme: l'évolution des villes, la leçon de l'Antiquité (in French), Paris: Boivin, p. 320
- Marcel Poëte (1933), Paris durant la grande époque classique (XVIIIe siècle) exposition de la bibliothèque et des travaux historiques de la ville de Paris (in French), Paris: Robert Burnand; impr. P. Dupont, p. 80
- Marcel Poëte (1938), Paris. Son évolution créatrice (in French), Paris: Vincent, Fréal et Cie, p. 151

== Sources ==
- "Fonds Bonnier, Louis (1856-1946)". Archiwebture (in French). Ministère de la culture et de la communication: Cité de l'architecture et du patrimoine. Archived from the original on 2015-12-10.
- "Henri Sellier (1883–1943)". La cité-jardin de Stains (in French). Seine-Saint-Denis Tourisme.
- Levin, Miriam R. (2010), "Bringing the future to earth in Paris, 1851-1914", Urban Modernity: Cultural Innovation in the Second Industrial Revolution, MIT Press, ISBN 978-0-262-26563-8
- "Marcel Poëte (1866-1950)" (in French). BnF.
- Payre, Renaud (September 1998), "Review of Calabi, Donatella, Marcel Poete et le Paris des Annees vingt: aux Origines de l'histoire des villes", H-Urban, H-Net Reviews
- Penz, François; Lu, Andong (2011), Urban Cinematics: Understanding Urban Phenomena Through the Moving Image, Intellect Books, ISBN 978-1-84150-428-5
- Terranova, Charissa N. (September 2008), "Marcel Poëte's Bergsonian Urbanism Vitalism, Time, and the City", Journal of Urban History, 34 (6), doi:10.1177/0096144208317587
- Yates, Alexia M. (2015-10-06), Selling Paris: Property and Commercial Culture in the Fin-de-siècle Capital, Harvard University Press, ISBN 978-0-674-91598-5
