= Edward Colonna =

German-born designer

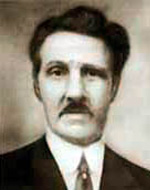
Edward Colonna

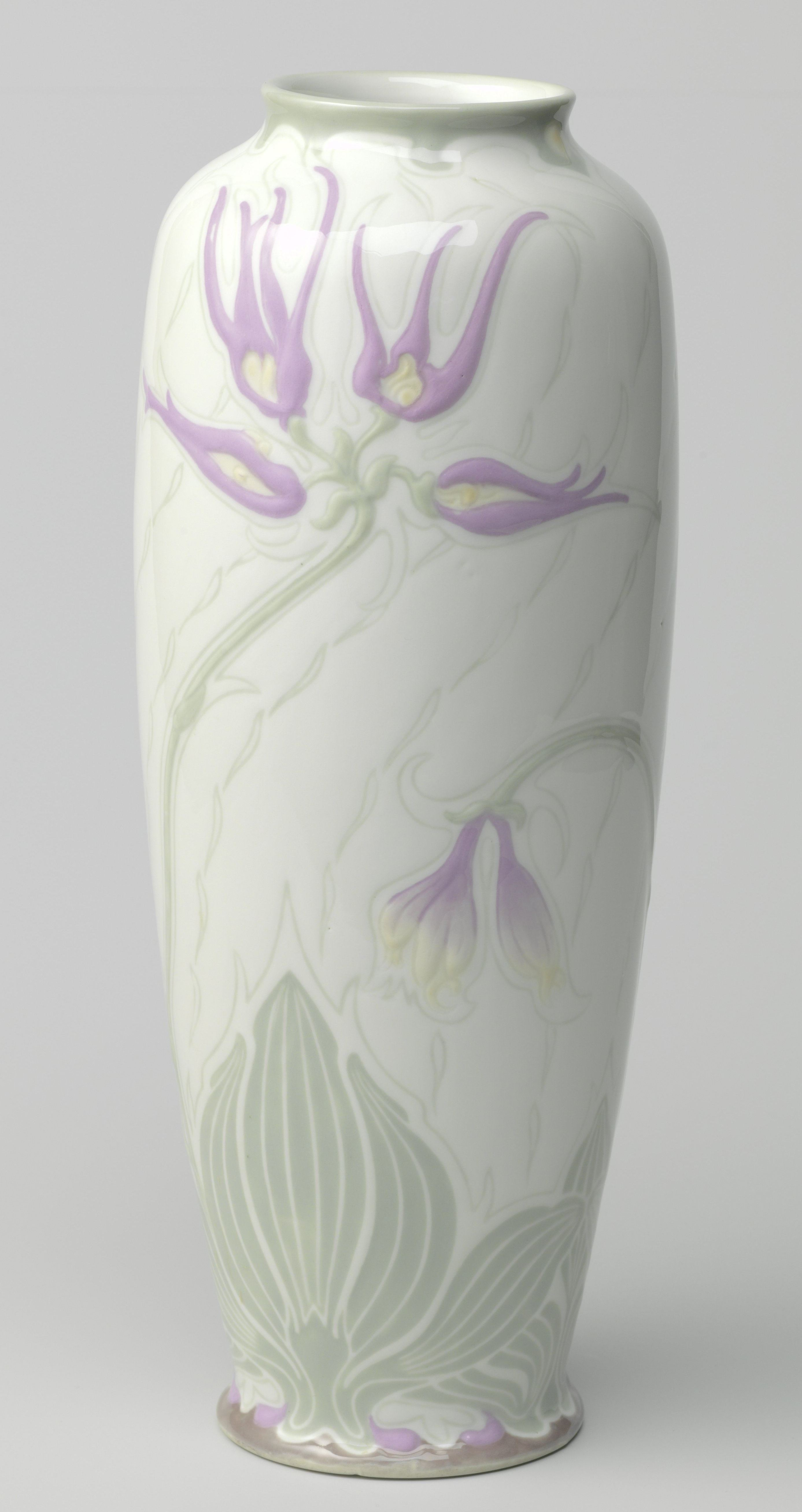
Porcelain vase designed by Colonna, c. 1900

Edward Colonna (1862 – 1948) was a German-born designer of furniture, metalwork, ceramics and other materials in the Art Nouveau style He was associated with Siegfried Bing and his gallery Maison de l'Art Nouveau. An exhibition of his work was organised by the Dayton Art Institute in 1984. A number of items by Colonna are in the collection of the Metropolitan Museum of Art in New York.
