= Louis Nicolle =

French politician (1871–1942)

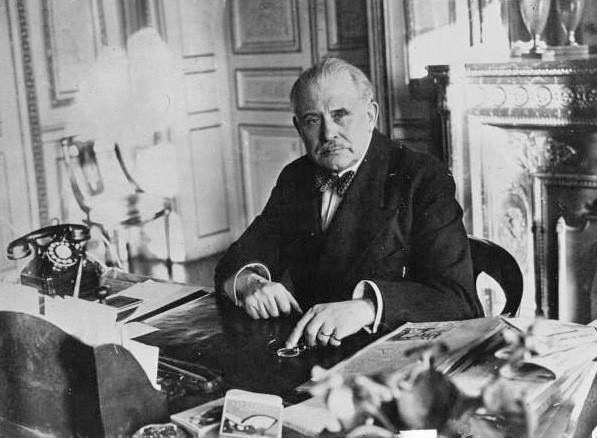
- Louis Nicolle in 1936

Minister of Health
- In office 24 January 1936 – 4 June 1936
- Prime Minister: Albert Sarraut
- Preceded by: Ernest Lafont
- Succeeded by: Henri Sellier

Personal details
- Born: 16 June 1871 Lille, Nord, France
- Died: 23 July 1942 (aged 71) Paris, France
- Occupation: Linen manufacturer

Louis Nicolle (16 June 1871 – 23 July 1942) was a French linen manufacturer and politician who was a deputy from 1924 to 1936, and was Minister of Health in 1936.

== Life ==
Louis Nicolle was born on 16 June 1871 in Lille, Nord. Nicolle's father was a former naval officer. His mother came from an established family of Lille industrialists. Nicolle attended the lycée in Lille, undertook his year of military service, then entered the business of manufacturing linen from flax. He became honorary chairman of the French Flax Committee, president of the Industrial Society of the Nord and French president of the International Federation of Flax Spinners. He was elected mayor of Lomme.

In 1911 Nicolle bought the Vandenbosh flax mill in Wambrechies. During World War I (1914–18) the Germans occupied the town, removed the machinery and dismantled the facilities. After the war Nicolle used compensation for wartime damage to build a modern new factory. The architect André Granet, nephew of Gustave Eiffel, undertook the project in 1923–25 using reinforced concrete. The building was a pioneering example of the new construction approach.

In 1924 Nicolle was elected deputy on the Democratic Republican Entente list, and was reelected until he retired from political life in 1936. He was Minister of Health from 24 January 1936 to 4 June 1936 in the cabinet of Albert Sarraut. Louis Nicolle died in Paris in the 8th arrondissement on 23 July 1942 at the age of 71.

== Publications ==
- Julien (capitaine); Nicolle, Louis (1917), La Culture et l'Importation du Lin de Russie (in French), Paris: Collection de l'association "France-Russie, p. 17
- Nicolle, Louis (1935), preface, Le tapis : un art, une industrie, by Windels, Fernand (in French), Lainé, Lucien, Préface, Paris: les Editions D'Antin, p. 212

== Sources ==
- Collectif (2005). "Nicolle (Louis)". Dictionnaire des parlementaires français de 1940 à 1958 (in French). Paris: La Documentation française.
- Jolly, Jean (1960–1977). "Nicolle (Louis)". Dictionnaire des parlementaires français; notices biographiques sur les ministres, députés et sénateurs français de 1889 à 1940 (in French). Paris: Presses universitaires de France. ISBN 2-1100-1998-0.
- La Linière Nicolle (in French), Mairie de Wambrechies
