= Henri Sellier =

French politician (1883–1943)

Henri Charles Sellier
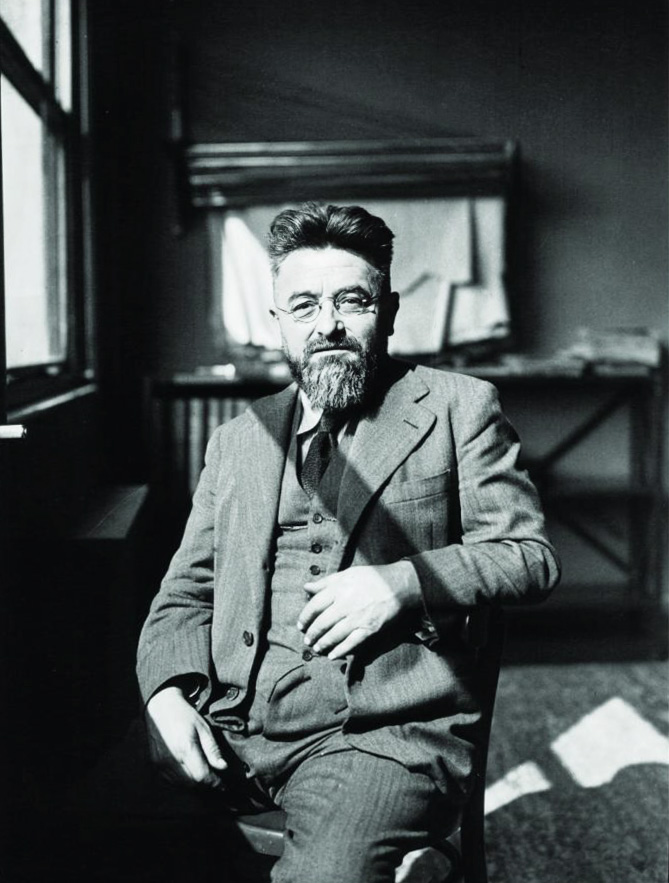
- Sellier in 1936

Minister of Health
- In office 4 June 1936 – 21 June 1937
- Prime Minister: Leon Blum
- Preceded by: Louis Nicolle
- Succeeded by: Marc Rucart

Personal details
- Born: 22 December 1883 Bourges, Cher, France
- Died: 24 November 1943 (aged 59) Suresnes, Seine. France
- Education: HEC Paris
- Occupation: Administrator

Henri Charles Sellier (22 December 1883 – 24 November 1943) was a French administrator, urban planner and Socialist politician. He did much to develop garden cities in the Paris region. He was Minister of Health in 1936–37.

== Life ==
=== Early years ===
Henri Charles Sellier was born on 22 December 1883 in Bourges, Cher. His father was a skilled metalworker who became a foreman in the cannon foundry of the Bourges arsenal. His mother, who came from a prosperous farming family, ran a small watch and jewelry shop. Sellier won a scholarship to the lycée in Bourges. He was a brilliant pupil, and won a state scholarship to study at the École des Hautes Études Commerciales (HEC Paris) business school, where he gained a diploma in 1901. In the summer of 1902 the HEC sent Sellier to work in the Siemens plant in Hamburg as secretary to Walther Rathenau, where he first met Albert Thomas.

Sellier was influenced by the socialists Édouard Vaillant and Jules-Louis Breton. He joined the Blanquist Revolutionary Socialist Workers' Party in 1898. Due to his left-wing political views, he had difficulty finding a permanent job. From 1902 to 1906 he worked in various financial and commercial enterprises while studying in his spare time. In 1906 he graduated with a degree in law from the Faculty of Paris. That year he joined the Ministry of Labor as a rédacteur, and in a few years became bureau chief. In 1907 Sellier married Jessa Guitton, a seamstress and then shop worker. They had two children, a boy and a girl.

=== Political career ===
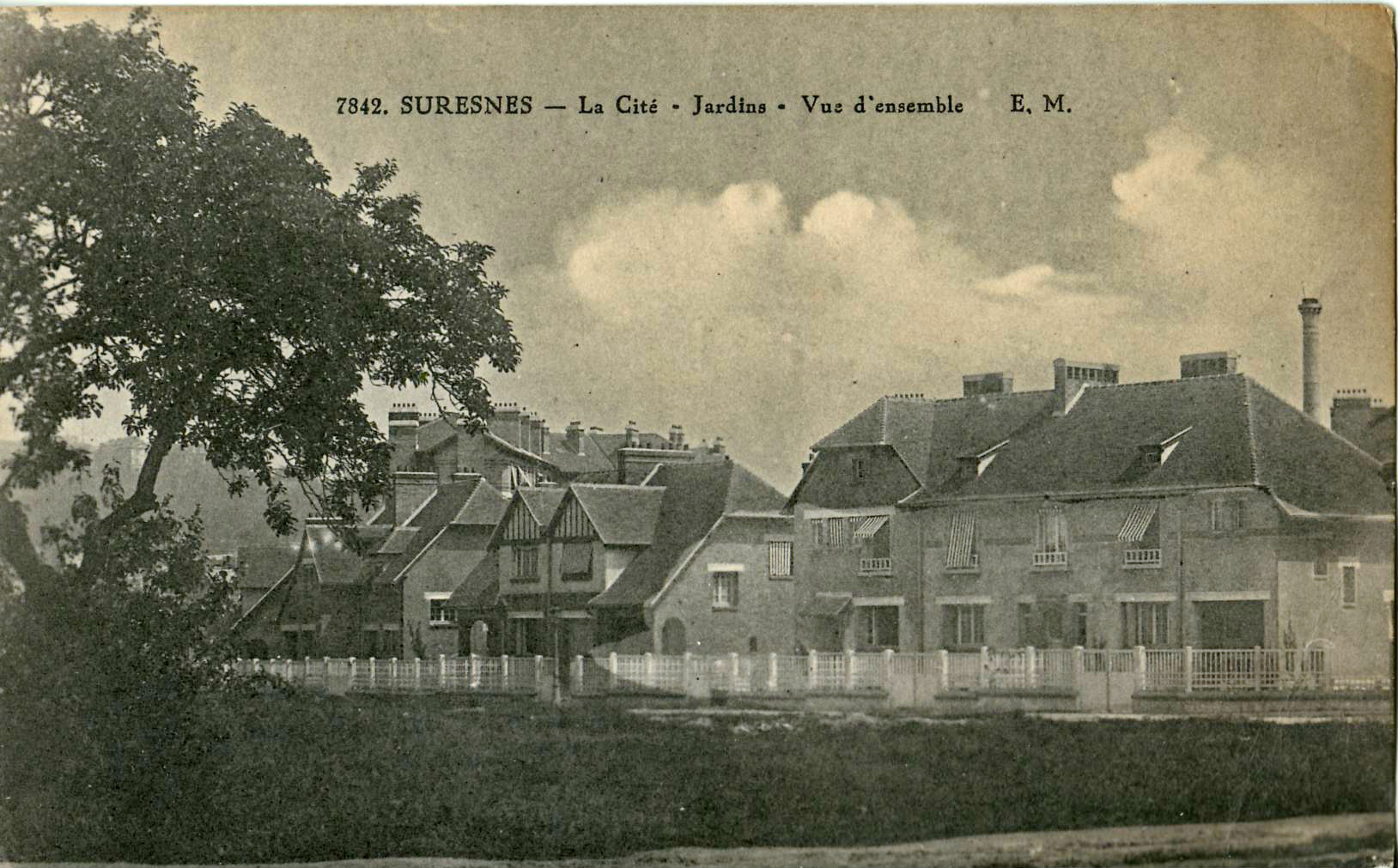
Suresnes La Cité-Jardin in the 1930s

Sellier remained an active socialist and collaborated with Jean Jaurès and Albert Thomas. He voted with the majority to join the Communist Third International at the Tours Congress in November 1920, but in October 1921 was expelled from the French Communist Party and joined the Socialist French Section of the Workers' International (SFIO). He remained a member of the SFIO for the rest of his life.

In 1909 Sellier was elected to the Puteaux municipal council in the western suburbs of Paris. In 1910 he was elected to represent the canton of Puteaux in the general council of the Seine department, and resigned from the Ministry. He was reelected to the general council in 1912 and 1919. He was elected mayor of Suresnes in 1919, and held office until 1940. His electoral program highlighted improvements to health, housing and urban renewal. In 1925 the canton of Puteaux was divided, and Sellier was elected to represent the 2nd district, Suresnes and Nanterre-Sud, in the general council of the Seine. He was re-elected in 1929 and 1935. He was general rapporteur of the budget of the Seine department from 1917 to 1920, and president of the general council in 1927–28.

Sellier ran unsuccessfully for election to the senate in January 1927. He was elected senator for the Seine in the first round in the elections of 20 October 1935 on the Popular Front list. He was Minister of Health in the first cabinet of Léon Blum from 4 June 1936 to 21 June 1937.

=== Urban planning ===
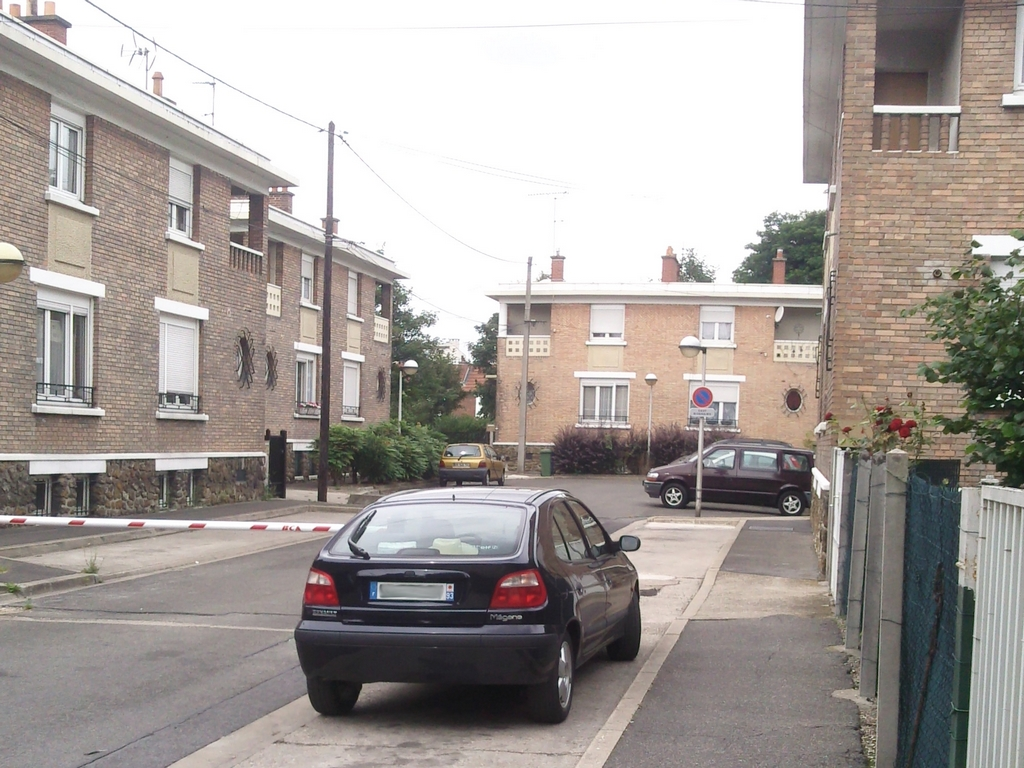
"collectif" housing in the Drancy garden city

Sellier was appointed managing director of the Office des Habitations à Bon Marché (Office of Affordable Housing) of the Seine department when it was created in 1915, and dedicated himself to urban issues and public housing. He moved to Suresnes that year, and would do much to improve the municipal facilities. In 1918 Sellier and Marcel Poëte founded the École des hautes études urbaines (EHEU, School of Advanced Urban Studies) and the review La Vie Urbaine. Sellier helped found the Union internationale des villes (International Union of Towns), of which he was vice president from 1920. In 1925 he was one of the founders of the Union amicale des maires de banlieue (Friendly Union of Suburban Mayors).

Sellier became a role model for Social-Democratic city leaders in the inter-war period. He aimed for a system in which efficient teams of specialists would regulate urban agglomérations to maximize the welfare and individual potential of the inhabitants. These agglomérations would not necessarily reflect traditional administrative boundaries, but would be natural units for planning purposes. He said, "The tentacular city is a fact. Its advantages and disadvantages may be discussed, but it would be stupid to deny it and reckless to hinder its social role. He saw the old administrative structure of Paris and its surrounding communes as an outdated obstacle to the healthy evolution of the overall urban area, in which unregulated capitalist expansion would inevitably cause social evils. Sellier proposed a ring of garden cities surrounding Paris. Over the years, Selliers views evolved from emphasizing local political responsibility to an approach based more on social sciences and cost-effectiveness.

Sellier wanted Suresnes to become a city at whose gates "the prospective inhabitant ceases to be a worker and becomes once more a man." He became hugely popular as he transformed Suresnes into a model of modernist and rationalist urban planning. As soon as he took office as mayor of Suresnes in 1919 Sellier began to establish a system of social services with a special emphasis on the health of children. One of his first steps was to restructure the colonie de vacances through which children from the city were given vacations of eight or more weeks with country families in the Nièvre. The children would be freed from the collective discipline of the city, "one of the major causes of mental exhaustion among children in our great cities." They would gain a living link to the countryside, a sort of adopted birthplace.

Sellier organized health protection from infancy, created institutions for education at all ages, built many public facilities and was innovative in providing housing that was comfortable and hygienic. He inspired the creation of fifteen garden cities between 1920 and 1945: Boulogne-Billancourt, Champigny-sur-Marne, Charenton-le-Pont, Châtenay-Malabry, Drancy, Drancy Cité de la Muette, Gennevilliers, Les Lilas, Maisons-Alfort, Le Plessis-Robinson, Le Pré-Saint-Gervais/Pantin, Stains, Vanves and Vitry-sur-Seine. In 1937 Sellier and Poëte founded the Fédération Internationale de l’habitation et de l’urbanisme (International Federation of Housing and Urban Planning).

=== World War II ===
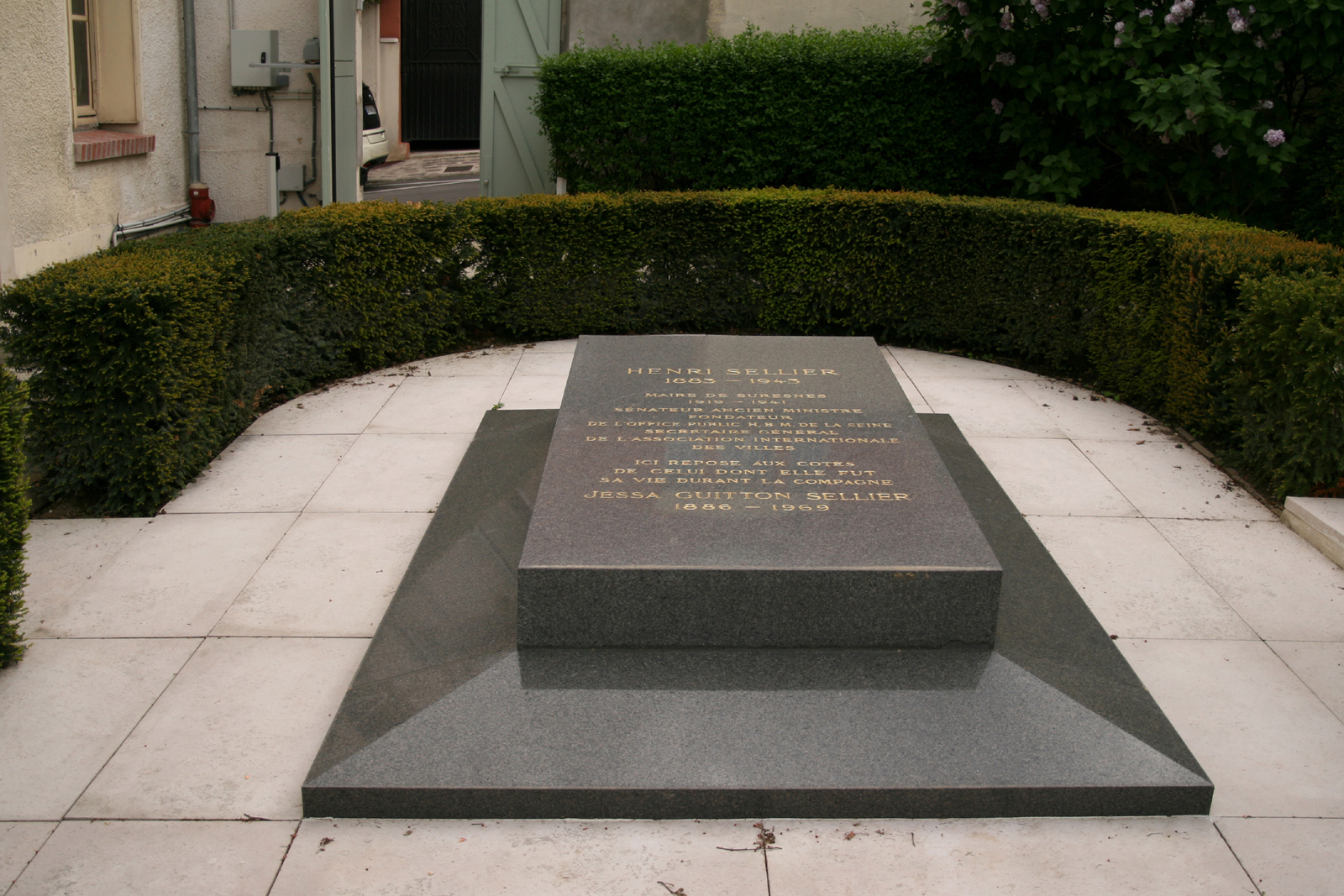
Tomb of Henri Sellier in the Cimetière Carnot in Suresnes

During World War II (1939–45) Sellier refrained from voting on the constitutional change that gave full power to Marshal Philippe Pétain. He was removed from office on 22 June 1941 by the Vichy authorities, arrested by the Gestapo and detained in the camp at Compiègne for almost a month. He refused to work with collaborationist socialists and founded a socialist action committee, which became part of the French Resistance. He died at the age of 59 on 24 November 1943 in Suresnes, Seine. A large crowd defied a ban and attended his funeral.

== Publications ==
- Henri Sellier (1920). Les banlieues urbaines et la réorganisation administrative du département de la Seine (in French). Albert Thomas, preface. Paris: M. Rivière. p. 107.
- Henri Sellier (1921). Essai sur les évolutions comparées du logement (in French). p. 49.
- Henri Sellier (1921). La Coopération ouvrière (in French). Paris: Société d'études et de documentation municipale. p. 20.
- Henri Sellier (1921). Union des villes et communes de France (in French). Paris: E. Leroux. p. 32.
- Henri Sellier (1921). La crise du logement et l'intervention publique en matière d'habitation populaire dans l'agglomération parisienne (in French). Paris: Ed. de l'Office public d'habitations à bon marché du département de la Seine. p. 1250.
- Marcel Poëte; Henri Sellier (1926). Paris pendant la guerre (in French). Paris: Dotation Carnegie pour la paix internationale. p. 105.
- Henri Sellier (1927). Le problème du logement, son influence sur les conditions de l'habitation et l'aménagement des villes (in French). Paris: les Presses universitaires de France. pp. 179.
- Henri Sellier (1935). Le programme municipal pour les élections de 1935 (in French). Florentinus Marinus Wibaut, preface. Paris: Union des élus municipaux socialistes. p. 96.
- Henri Sellier (1937). La Santé publique et la collectivité. Hygiène et service social, coordination (in French). Émile Vandervelde, preface. Paris: impr. de A. Maretheux et L. Pactat. p. 75.
- Henri Sellier (1998). Une cité pour tous (in French). Bernard Marrey, preface. Paris: Éd. du Linteau. p. 266.
- Henri Sellier. introduction. Les Scandales de la prostitution réglementée. By Paul Gemähling. (in French). Paris: Éditions de "L'Union temporaire". p. 48.

== Sources ==
- collectif (2005). "SELLIER (Henri)". Dictionnaire des parlementaires français de 1940 à 1958 (in French). Paris: La Documentation française. ISBN 2-11-005990-7.
- Downs, Laura Lee (2002-11-29). Childhood in the Promised Land: Working-Class Movements and the Colonies de Vacances in France, 1880–1960. Duke University Press. ISBN 0-8223-2944-1.
- "Henri Sellier (1883–1943)". La cité-jardin de Stains (in French). Seine-Saint-Denis Tourisme.
- "Henri Sellier, urbaniste et réformateur social" (in French). La Découverte.
- Jolly, Jean (1960–1977). "Sellier (Henri Charles)". Dictionnaire des parlementaires français; notices biographiques sur les ministres, députés et sénateurs français de 1889 à 1940 (in French). Paris: Presses universitaires de France. ISBN 2-1100-1998-0.
- Rabinow, Paul (1995-12-01). French Modern: Norms and Forms of the Social Environment. University of Chicago Press. ISBN 978-0-226-70174-5.
