= Maison de l'Art Nouveau =

Parisian art gallery opened by Siegfried Bing

Coordinates: 48°52′27″N 2°20′23″E

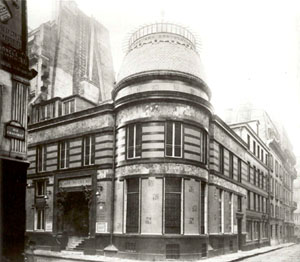
The Maison de l’Art nouveau, 1895

The Maison de l'Art Nouveau ("House of New Art"), abbreviated often as L'Art Nouveau, and known also as Maison Bing for the owner, was a gallery opened on 26 December 1895, by Siegfried Bing at 22 rue de Provence, Paris.

The building was designed by the architect Louis Bonnier (1856–1946). Unlike his earlier stores at the same location and nearby at 19 rue Chauchat that specialized in Japanese and Asian art objects, the gallery specialized in modern art. The original exhibition featured windows designed by Nabi artists, including Henri de Toulouse-Lautrec, and made by Louis Comfort Tiffany. The original interior of the gallery included rooms designed by artists Maurice Denis, Charles Conder, Henry Van de Velde, Albert Besnard, and Edouard Vuillard. Many other artists exhibited works inside the gallery as well, including tapestries, ceramics, stained glass, furniture, metalwork, and prints. (71)

Across the years, Bing held smaller exhibitions that highlighted artists such as Louis Legrand, Eugène Carrière, S. Moulijn, Charles Cottet, and Edvard Munch.

In 1889, Bing expanded his galleries to include an atelier that began producing jewelry, furniture, tapestries, and other art objects.

The fame of his gallery was increased at the 1900 Exposition Universelle, when Bing exhibited his "Art Nouveau Bing" pavilion. In the pavilion, Bing exhibited installations of modern furniture, tapestries and objets d'art by artists Edward Colonna, Georges de Feure, and Eugène Gaillard. These decorative displays became associated strongly with an artistic style that was becoming popular across Europe, and for which his gallery subsequently provided a name: Art Nouveau.

== See also ==
- Art Nouveau in Paris
