= Templeuve-en-Pévèle =

- Commune
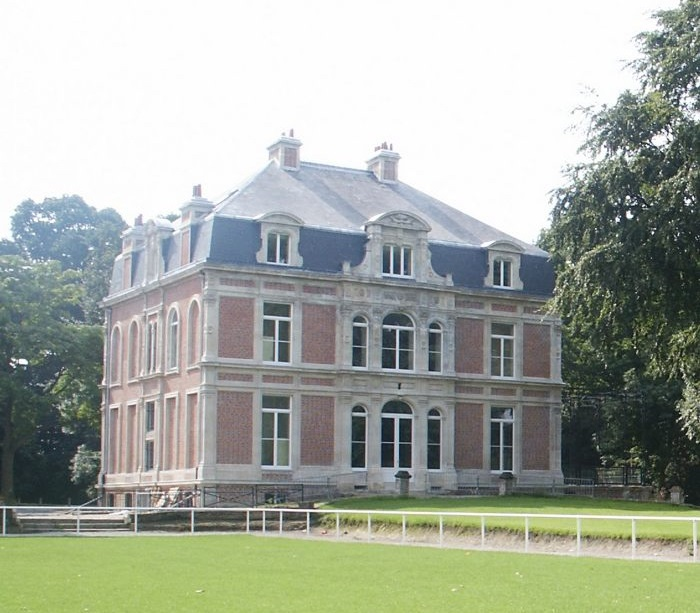
- Château Baratte

- Coat of arms
- Location of Templeuve-en-Pévèle
- Location within France Location within Hauts-de-France
- Coordinates: 50°31′38″N 3°10′33″E
- Country: France
- Region: Hauts-de-France
- Department: Nord
- Arrondissement: Lille
- Canton: Templeuve-en-Pévèle
- Intercommunality: Pévèle-Carembault

Government
  - Mayor (2020–2026): Luc Monnet
- Area^{1}: 15.84 km^{2} (6.12 sq mi)
- Elevation: 43 m (141 ft)
- Highest elevation: 54 m (177 ft)
- Lowest elevation: 26 m (85 ft)
- Population (2023): 7,202
  - Density: 454.7/km^{2} (1,178/sq mi)
- Time zone: UTC+01:00 (CET)
  - Summer (DST): UTC+02:00 (CEST)
- INSEE/Postal code: 59586 /59242
- ^{1} French Land Register data, which excludes lakes, ponds, glaciers > 1 km^{2} (0.386 sq mi or 247 acres) and river estuaries.

Templeuve-en-Pévèle (French pronunciation: [tɑ̃plœv ɑ̃ pevɛl], lit. 'Templeuve in Pévèle'; before 2015: Templeuve) is a commune in the Nord department in northern France.

== Name ==
The commune is recorded as Templovium in 877, but was subsequently called Templeuve. The name may be derived from Templum Jovis meaning The Temple of Jupiter. In October 2014, the council voted to change the commune's name to "Templeuve-en-Pévèle". The name change took effect 16 November 2015.

== Population ==
Historical population
| Year | Pop. | ±% p.a. |
|---|---|---|
| 1968 | 4,123 | — |
| 1975 | 5,085 | +3.04% |
| 1982 | 5,289 | +0.56% |
| 1990 | 5,371 | +0.19% |
| 1999 | 5,778 | +0.81% |
| 2007 | 5,731 | −0.10% |
| 2012 | 5,817 | +0.30% |
| 2017 | 6,059 | +0.82% |
| 2023 | 7,202 | +2.92% |
Source: INSEE

== Heraldry ==
| Arms of Templeuve | The arms of Templeuve are blazoned : Azure, the name Templeuve bendwise argent between 2 bendlets gemel Or. |

== Windmill ==
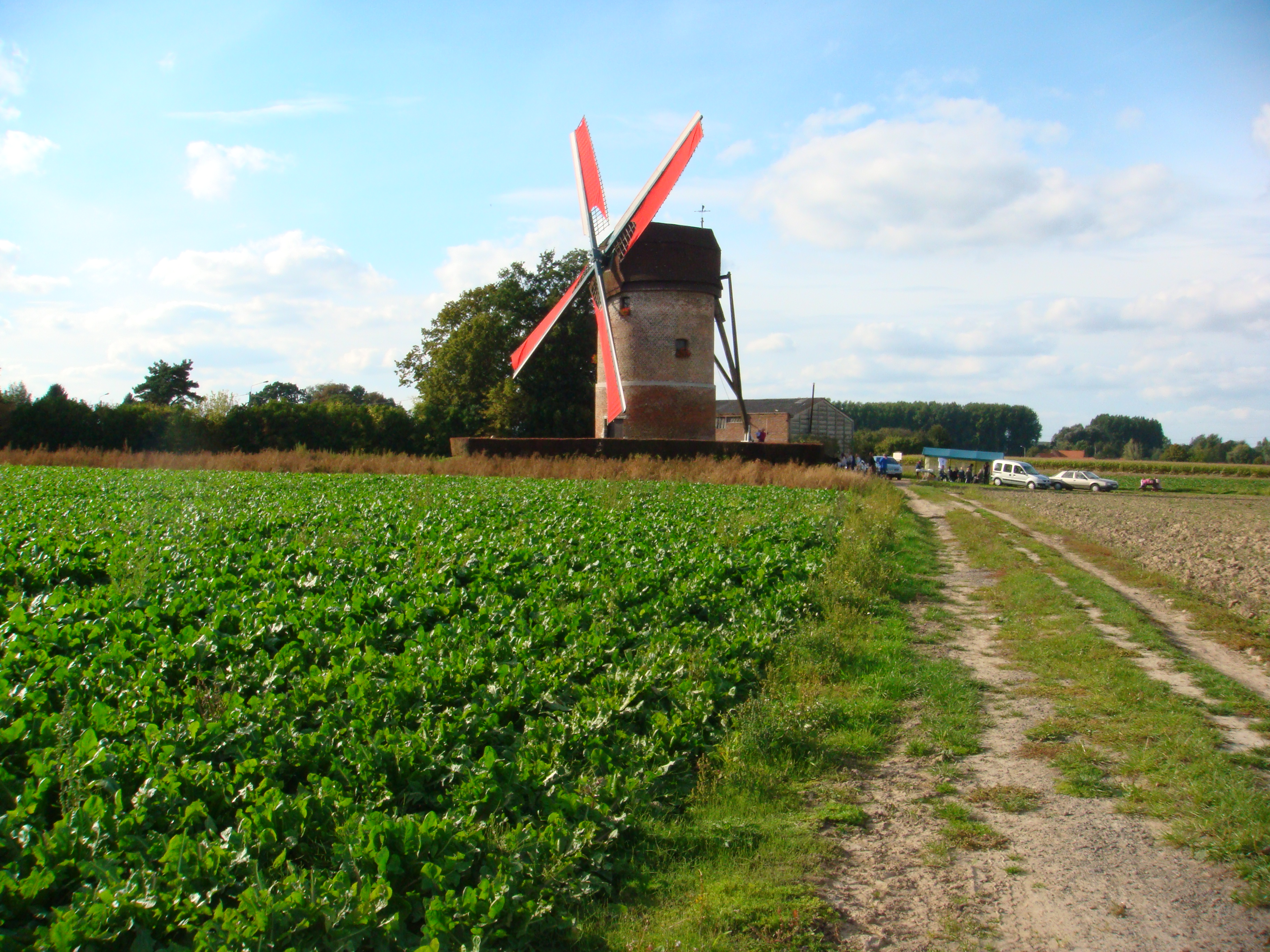
Windmill of Vertain

Templeuve-en-Pévèle is the location of a windmill. The windmill tower is first mentioned in 1328 in rent documents of Anchin Abbey, as the "Moulin de Viertain". It was burned during the war in 1616, and completely rebuilt. It stopped productive work in 1908, and was damaged during the First World War by people wanting wood. Its restoration began in 1980 and the sails were added in 1985. It is now open to visits.

It was successful in the hands of the families De la Porte dit d'Espierres, Robert, Jacops d'Aigrement before the French Revolution. It was then owned by the Havet and Band families. The mill, whose tower was erected at the end of the seventeenth century, remained active until the death of miller Jean-Baptiste Houze on 21 November 1907. His widow completed grinding the last bags of grain and then abandoned the mill.

Jean Bruggeman, the president of the Regional Association 'des Amis des Moulins', inspired the municipality of Templeuve-en-Pévèle to acquire the mill in 1973. The restoration was completed on 15 June 1985, and it was opened by the mayor, Robert Vandelanoitte, and Alphonse Dhelin, the Assistant for Cultural Affairs.

The post-house design means that the internal mechanism and upper structure rests on a pivot, which rotates when wind direction changes.

- Tower Height: 10.20 m (33.5 ft)
- Diameter: 5.10 m (16.7 ft)
- Thickness of walls: 1.25 m (4.1 ft) at the base - 1.12 m (3.7 ft) at the summit
- Sails: 24 m (79 ft) wide
- Mechanism Two pairs of millstones
  - The Large Spinning Wheel: 2.90 m (9.5 ft) in diameter.
  - Rouet Little 2 m (6.6 ft) in diameter
- Wood used : oak, elm, iroko for the mechanisms. Chestnut for the shingles

== See also ==
- Communes of the Nord department
