= List of Académie des Beaux-Arts members: Architecture =

This is a list of past and present members of the Académie des Beaux-Arts in Section III: Architecture.

== Seat #1 ==
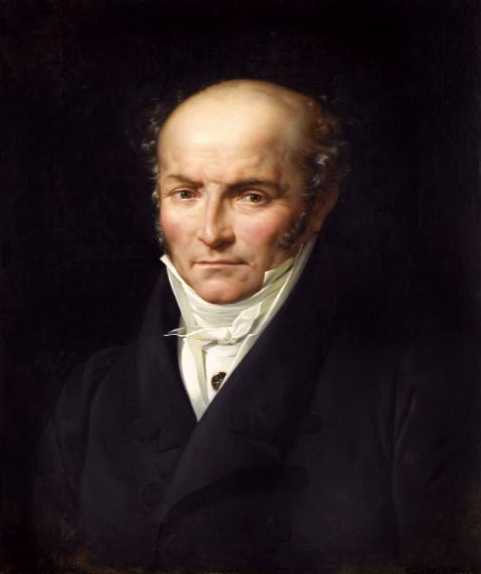
Maximilien Joseph Hurtault

- elected 1795 : Jacques Gondouin (1737–1818)
- 1819 : Maximilien Joseph Hurtault (1765–1824)
- 1824 : Pierre-Jules Delespine (1756–1825)
- 1825 : Louis-Hippolyte Lebas (1782–1867)
- 1868 : Léon Vaudoyer (1803–1872)
- 1872 : Théodore Ballu (1817–1885)
- 1885 : Honoré Daumet (1826–1911)
- 1912 : Edmond Paulin (1848–1915)
- 1918 : Henri Deglane (1855–1931)
- 1931 : Paul Bigot (1870–1942)
- 1943 : Auguste Perret (1874–1954)
- 1954 : Roger-Henri Expert (1882–1955)
- 1956 : Charles Nicod (1878–1967)
- 1968 : Jean de Mailly (1911–1975)
- 1976 : Jacques Couëlle (1902–1996)
- 1998 : André Wogenscky (1916–2004)
- 2008 : Jacques Rougerie (born 1945)

== Seat #2 ==
Antoine Vaudoyer

- 1795 : Antoine-François Peyre (1739–1823)
- 1823 : Antoine Vaudoyer (1756–1846)
- 1846 : Jean-Baptiste Lesueur (1794–1883)
- 1884 : Louis-Jules André (1819–1890)
- 1890 : Jean-Louis Pascal (1837–1920)
- 1920 : Jean-Camille Formigé (1845–1926)
- 1926 : Alexandre Marcel (1860–1928)
- 1928 : Alphonse Defrasse (1860–1939)
- 1939 : Patrice Bonnet (1879–1964)
- 1961 : Noël Le Maresquier (1903–1982)
- 1983 : Bernard Zehrfuss (1911–1996)
- 1998 : Michel Folliasson (1925–2011)
- 2015 : Jean-Michel Wilmotte (born 1948)

== Seat #3 ==
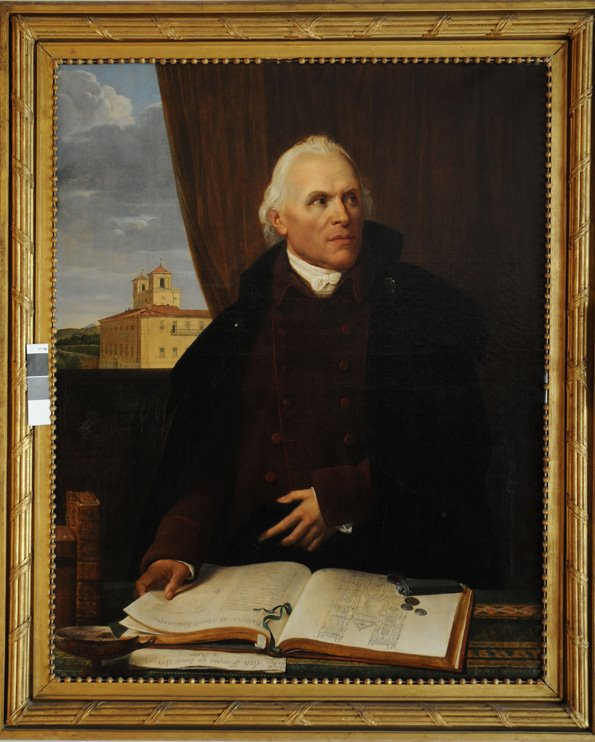
Pierre-Adrien Pâris

- 1795 : Pierre-Adrien Pâris (1745–1819)
- 1796 : Léon Dufourny (1754–1818)
- 1818 : Jean-Thomas Thibault (1757–1826)
- 1826 : Éloi Labarre (1764–1833)
- 1833 : Auguste Guenepin (1780–1842)
- 1842 : Martin-Pierre Gauthier (1790–1855)
- 1855 : Hector Lefuel (1810–1880)
- 1881 : Léon Ginain (1825–1898)
- 1898 : Louis Bernier (1845–1919)
- 1919 : Albert Tournaire (1862–1958)
- 1958 : Albert Laprade (1883–1978)
- 1979 : Maurice Novarina (1907–2002)
- 2008 : Aymeric Zublena (born 1936)

== Seat #4 ==
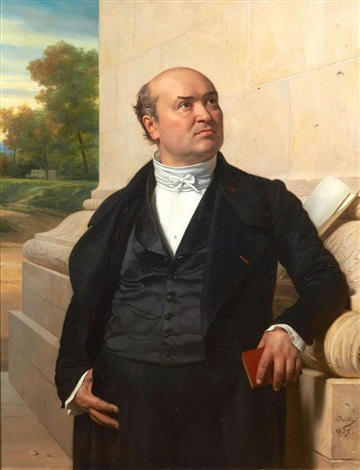
Jean-Nicolas Huyot

- 1795 : Étienne-Louis Boullée (1728–1799)
- 1799 : Jacques Denis Antoine (1733–1801)
- 1801 : Jean-François Heurtier (1739–1822)
- 1822 : Jean-Nicolas Huyot (1780–1840)
- 1840 : Auguste Caristie (1783–1862)
- 1863 : Victor Baltard (1805–1874)
- 1874 : Charles Garnier (1825–1898)
- 1898 : Constant Moyaux (1835–1911)
- 1911 : Louis Marie Cordonnier (1854–1940)
- 1942 : Jules Formigé (1879–1960)
- 1961 : Eugène Beaudouin (1898–1983)
- 1983 : Roger Taillibert (1926–2019)
- 2021 : Anne Démians (born 1963)

== Seat #5 ==
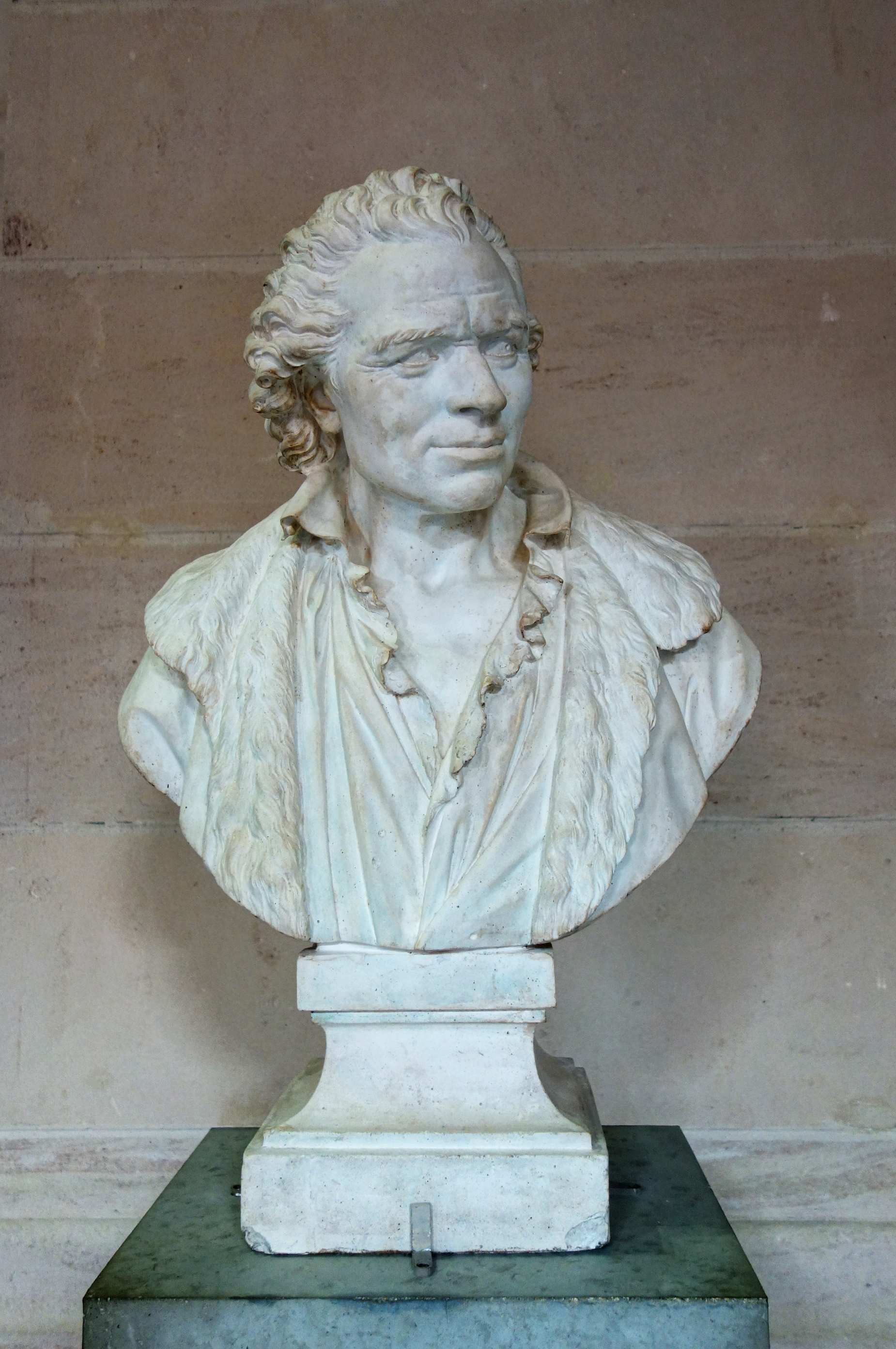
Charles De Wailly

- 1795 : Charles De Wailly (1729–1798)
- 1799 : Jean-François Chalgrin (1739–1811)
- 1811 : Charles Percier (1764–1838)
- 1838 : Jacques-Marie Huvé (1783–1852)
- 1853 : Jacques-Ignace Hittorf (1792–1867)
- 1867 : Henri Labrouste (1801–1875)
- 1875 : Antoine-Nicolas Bailly (1810–1892)
- 1892 : Gabriel-Auguste Ancelet (1829–1895)
- 1895 : Henri-Paul Nénot (1853–1934)
- 1935 : Gustave Umbdenstock (1866–1940)
- 1942 : Paul Tournon (1881–1964)
- 1965 : Urbain Cassan (1890–1979)
- 1979 : André Remondet (1908–1998)
- 1999 : Jean Balladur (1924–2002)
- 2005 : Claude Parent (1923–2016)
- 2018 : Marc Barani (born 1957)

== Seat #6 ==
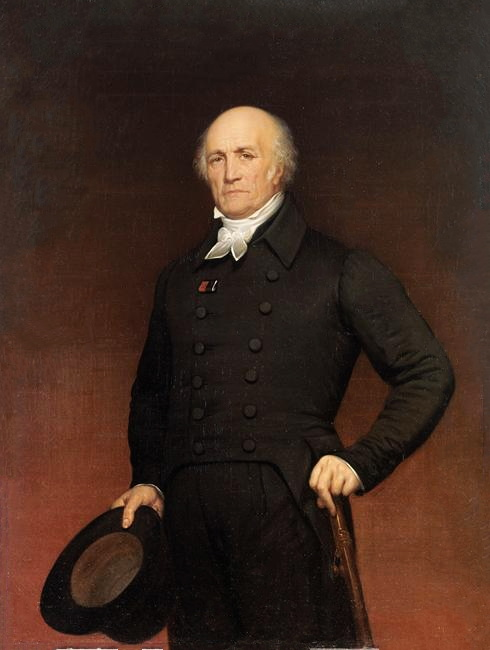
Pierre-François-Léonard Fontaine

- 1795 : Jean-Arnaud Raymond (1742–1811)
- 1811 : Pierre-François-Léonard Fontaine (1762–1853)
- 1853 : Émile Jacques Gilbert (1793–1874)
- 1875 : Paul Abadie (1812–1884)
- 1884 : Arthur-Stanislas Diet (1827–1890)
- 1890 : Alfred-Nicolas Normand (1822–1909)
- 1909 : Victor Laloux (1850–1937)
- 1938 : Charles Lemaresquier (1870–1972)
- 1972 : Marc Saltet (1906–2008)
- 2015 : Dominique Perrault (born 1953)

== Seat #7 ==
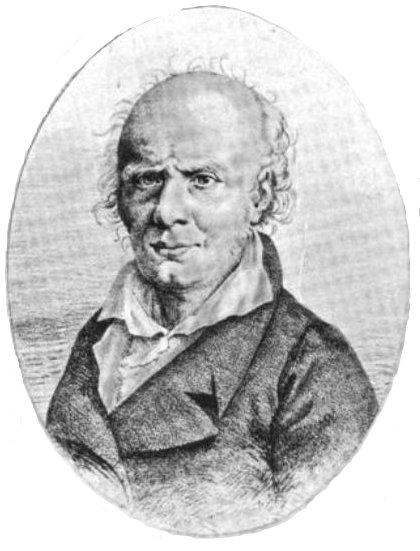
Jean-Baptiste Rondelet

- 1815 : Jean-Baptiste Rondelet (1743–1829)
- 1829 : Jacques Molinos (1750–1831)
- 1831 : Achille Leclère (1785–1853)
- 1854 : Alphonse de Gisors (1796–1866)
- 1867 : Joseph-Louis Duc (1802–1879)
- 1879 : Joseph Auguste Émile Vaudremer (1829–1914)
- 1914 : Gaston Redon (1853–1921)
- 1922 : Emmanuel Pontremoli (1865–1956)
- 1957 : Jacques Carlu (1890–1976)
- 1977 : Christian Langlois (1924–2007)
- 2013 : Alain-Charles Perrot (born 1945)

== Seat #8 ==
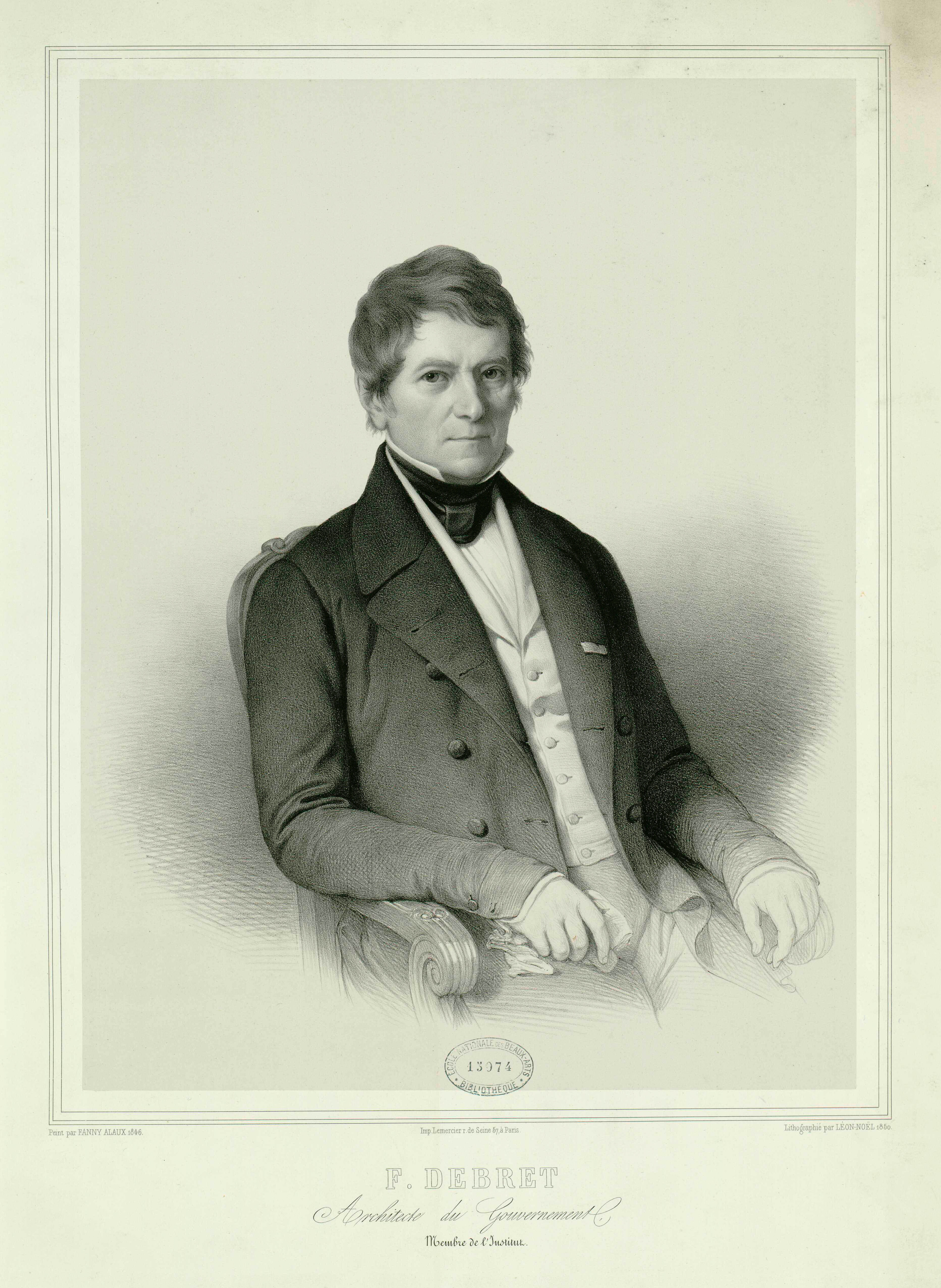
François Debret

- 1815 : Jacques-Charles Bonnard (1765–1818)
- 1818 : Bernard Poyet (1742–1824)
- 1825 : François Debret (1777–1850)
- 1850 : Guillaume Abel Blouet (1795–1853)
- 1853 : Louis Visconti (1791–1853)
- 1854 : Félix Duban (1797–1870)
- 1871 : Charles-Auguste Questel (1807–1888)
- 1888 : Georges-Ernest Coquart (1831–1902)
- 1902 : Charles-Louis Girault (1851–1932)
- 1933 : Henri Prost (1874–1959)
- 1960 : Roger Séassal (1885–1967)
- 1968 : Guillaume Gillet (1912–1987)

This seat was transferred to section VII in 1988.

== Seat #9 ==
- 1968 : Henry Bernard (1912–1994)
- 1996 : Paul Andreu (1938–2018)
- 2019 : Pierre-Antoine Gatier (born 1959)

== Seat #10 ==
- 2002 : Yves Boiret (1926–2018)
- 2018 : Bernard Desmoulin (born 1953)

== Sources ==
- List of members @ the Académie des Beaux-Arts website.

== See also ==
- List of Académie des Beaux-Arts members: Painting
- List of Académie des Beaux-Arts members: Sculpture
- List of Académie des Beaux-Arts members: Engraving
- List of Académie des Beaux-Arts members: Music
- List of Académie des Beaux-Arts members: Unattached
- List of Académie des Beaux-Arts members: Cinema
