= List of Académie des Beaux-Arts members: Engraving =

This is a list of past and present members of the Académie des Beaux-Arts in section IV: Engraving.

== Seat #1 ==
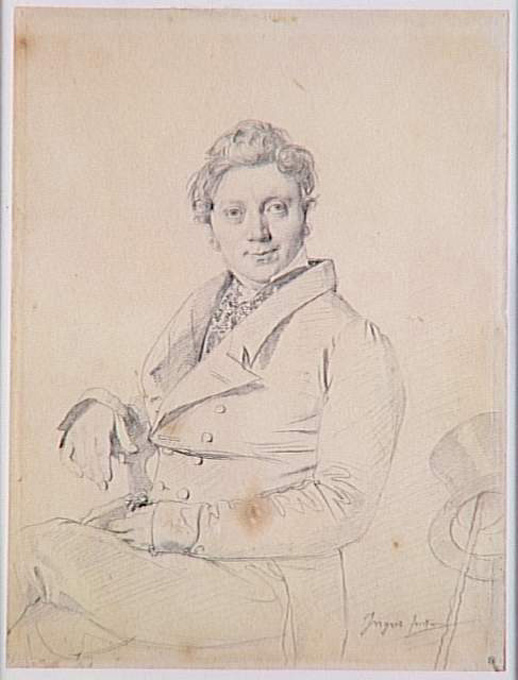
François Forster

- elected 1803: Charles Clément Balvay (1756–1822)
- 1822: Pierre Alexandre Tardieu (1756–1844)
- 1844: François Forster (1790–1872)
- 1873: Alphonse François (1814–1888)
- 1888: Auguste III Blanchard (1819–1898)
- 1898: Léopold Flameng (1831–1911)
- 1911: Émile-Jean Sulpis (1856–1942)
- 1943: Albert Decaris (1901–1988)
- 1989: Roger Vieillard (1907–1989)
- 1991: Jean-Marie Granier (1922–2007)
- 2008: Érik Desmazières (born 1948)

== Seat #2 ==
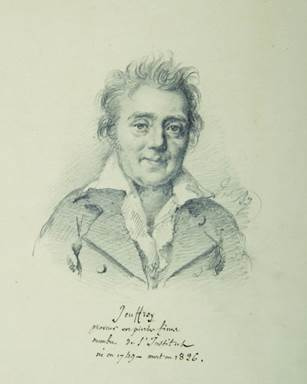
Romain-Vincent Jeuffroy

- 1803: Romain-Vincent Jeuffroy (1749–1826)
- 1826: Théodore Richomme (1785–1849)
- 1849: Louis-Pierre Henriquel-Dupont (1797–1892)
- 1892: Achille Jacquet (1846–1908)
- 1908: Charles Waltner (1846–1925)
- 1925: Jean-Émile Buland (1857–1938)
- 1938: André Dauchez (1870–1948)
- 1949: Paul Lemagny (1905–1977)
- 1978: Pierre-Yves Trémois (1921–2020)

== Seat #3 ==
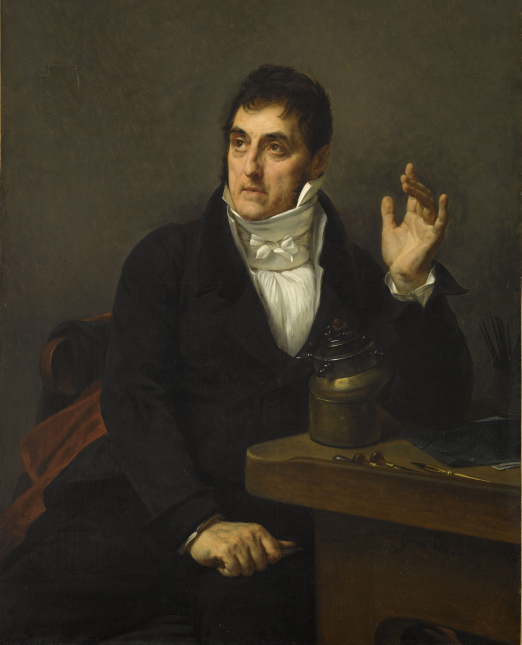
André Galle

- 1803: Rambert Dumarest (1750–1806)
- 1806: Pierre-Simon-Benjamin Duvivier (1730–1819)
- 1819: André Galle (1761–1844)
- 1845: Jacques-Édouard Gatteaux (1788–1881)
- 1881: Jules-Clément Chaplain (1839–1909)
- 1909: Frédéric-Charles-Victor de Vernon (1858–1912)
- 1913: Henri-Auguste Patey (1855–1930)
- 1930: Louis-Alexandre Bottée (1852–1940)
- 1942: Henri Dropsy (1885–1969)
- 1970: Raymond Corbin (1907–2002)
- 2005: Louis-René Berge (1927–2013)
- 2016: Astrid de La Forest (born 1962)

== Seat #4 ==
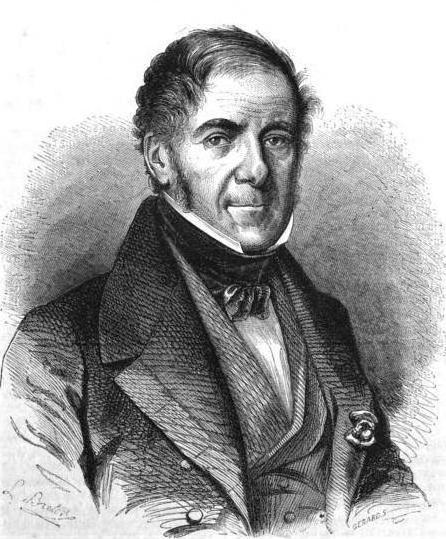
Auguste Gaspard Louis Desnoyers

- 1816: Auguste Gaspard Louis Desnoyers (1779–1857)
- 1857: Achille-Louis Martinet (1806–1877)
- 1878: Gustave Bertinot (1822–1888)
- 1888: Oscar Roty (1846–1911)
- 1911: Frédéric Laguillermie (1841–1934)
- 1935: Henri Le Riche (1868–1944)
- 1945: Demetrios Galanis (1882–1966)
- 1967: Pierre-Eugène Clairin (1897–1980)
- 1981: André Jacquemin (1904–1992)
- 1994: René Quillivic (1925–2016)
- 2018: Pierre Collin (born 1956)

== Sources ==
- List of members @ the Académie des Beaux-Arts website.

== See also ==
- List of Académie des Beaux-Arts members: Painting
- List of Académie des Beaux-Arts members: Sculpture
- List of Académie des Beaux-Arts members: Architecture
- List of Académie des Beaux-Arts members: Music
- List of Académie des Beaux-Arts members: Unattached
- List of Académie des Beaux-Arts members: Cinema
