= Jacques-Charles Bonnard =

French architect and engraver

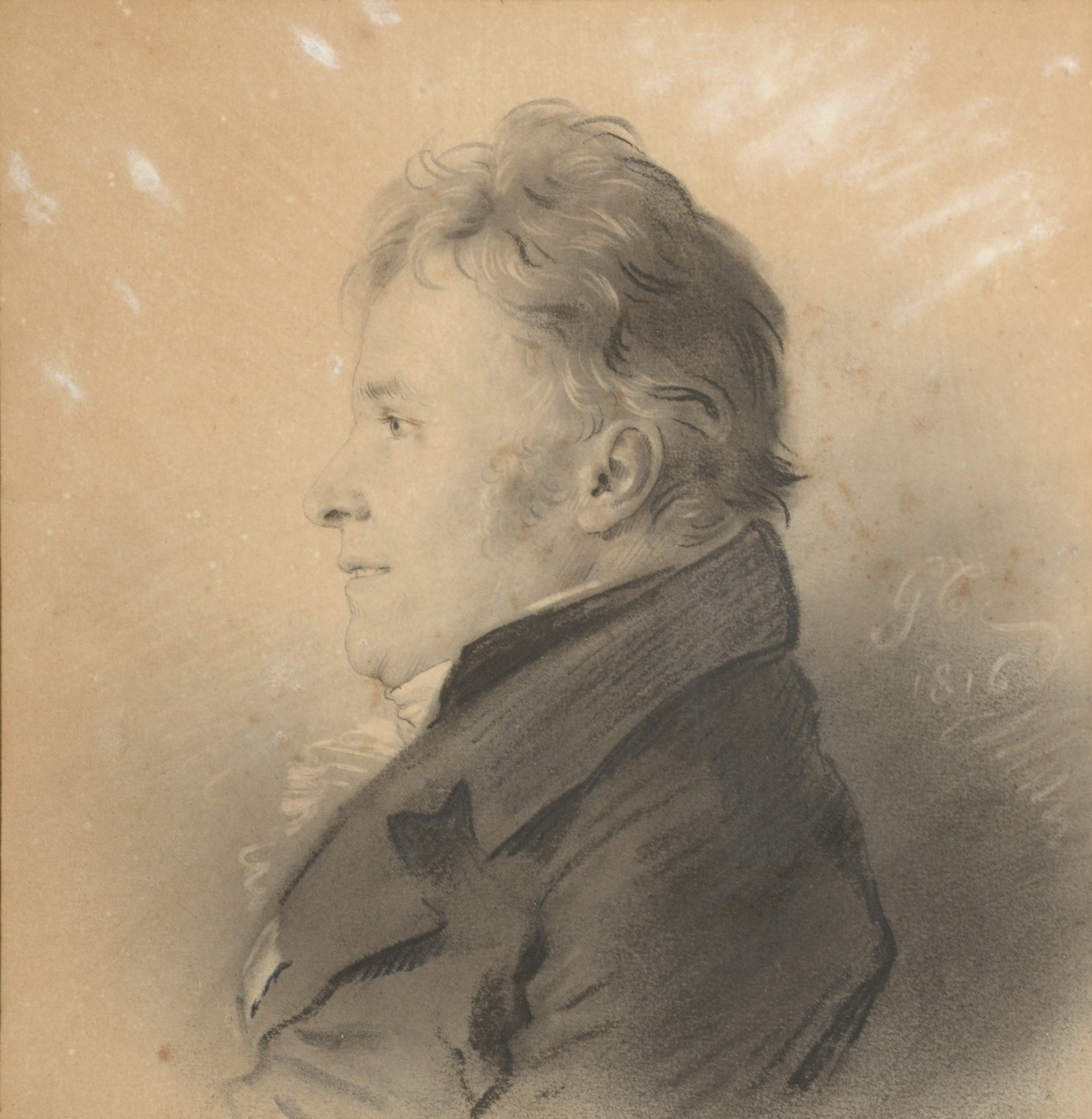
Jacques-Charles Bonnard, by Anne-Louis Girodet-Trioson (1816)

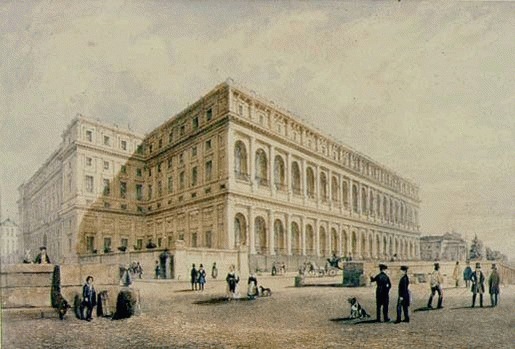
The Palais d'Orsay, completed by Jacques Lacornée (1779-1856), artist unknown

Jacques-Charles Bonnard (30 January 1765, Paris – 28 October 1818, Bordeaux) was a French architect and engraver.

== Life and work ==
He was a student of Jean-Augustin Renard at the École des Beaux-Arts. In 1788, he and Jean-Jacques Tardieu (1762-1833) shared the Prix de Rome, with their designs for a public treasury. He spent one year at the Villa Medici in Rome.

The beginning of his professional career coincided almost exactly with the beginning of the Revolution. Late in 1789, as a result of the Women's March on Versailles, King Louis XVI was forced to return to Paris. The Palais des Tuileries had been put to various uses over the years, and needed restoration to be fully habitable. Bonnard was one of those charged with the task.

During the same period, in 1791, he was commissioned to build a villa near Saint-Germain-en-Laye, by Philippe-François-Didier Usquin, a nobleman who had left Paris after being removed from his post as prosecutor. Work on both projects proceeded reasonably well until August of 1792, when a revolutionary mob overran the Palais, killing hundreds of the Swiss Guards. At that time, Bonnard found it prudent to emigrate. There appears to be no record of where he went.

He stayed away until the establishment of the Empire in 1804. A few years later, he succeeded Pierre-Nicolas Bénard as an official architect at the Ministry of Foreign Affairs. In 1808, he was chosen to design a new building for the Ministry's offices. The building, known as the Palais d'Orsay, was not completed until 1838, due to financial issues caused by the fall of the Empire. It was severely damaged by fire during the Commune in 1871, and was demolished in 1898. A similar project, for a new post office, was begun in 1811, and abandoned in 1812.

In 1815, he was elected to the Académie des Beaux-Arts, becoming the first to hold Seat #8 for architecture. His engravings include a volume depicting the most famous "pleasure houses" of Rome, after Percier and Fontaine, issued by Didot in 1809.
