= List of Académie des Beaux-Arts members: Sculpture =

This is a list of past and present members of the Académie des Beaux-Arts in section II: Sculpture.

== Seat #1 ==
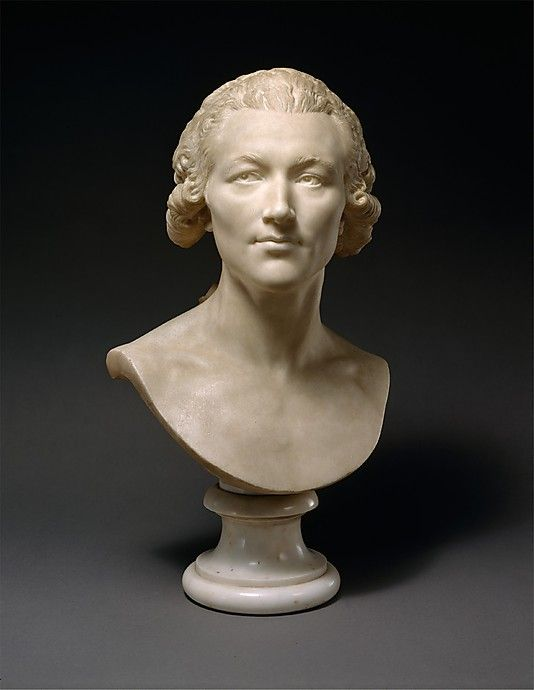
Philippe-Laurent Roland

- elected 1795: Philippe-Laurent Roland (1746–1816)
- 1816: Claude Ramey (1794–1838)
- 1838: Augustin-Alexandre Dumont (1801–1884)
- 1884: Louis-Ernest Barrias (1841–1905)
- 1905: Denys Puech (1864–1942)
- 1943: Paul Niclausse (1879–1958)
- 1960: Paul Belmondo (1898–1982)
- 1983: Jean Cardot (1930–2020)

== Seat #2 ==
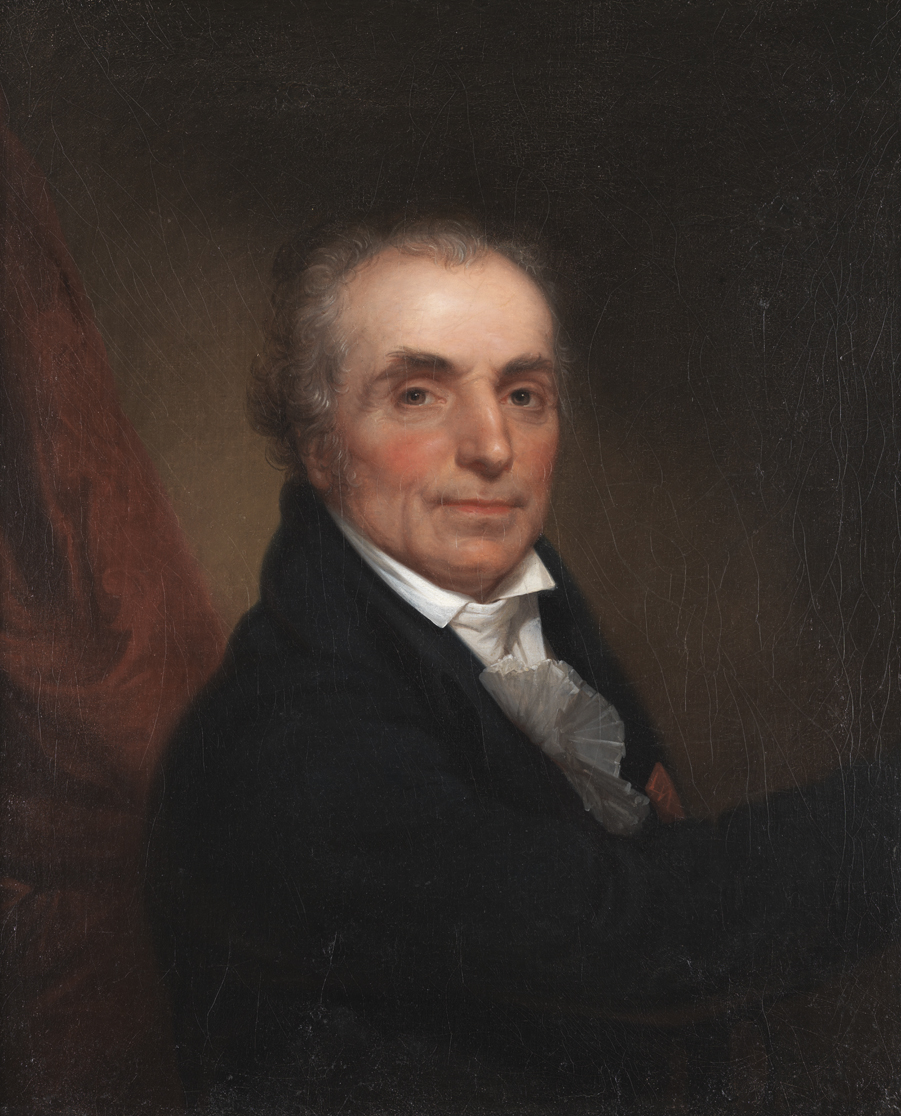
Jean-Antoine Houdon

- 1795: Jean-Antoine Houdon (1741–1828)
- 1828: Étienne-Jules Ramey (1796–1852)
- 1852: Bernard-Gabriel Seurre (1795–1867)
- 1868: Antoine-Louis Barye (1796–1875)
- 1875: Gabriel-Jules Thomas (1824–1905)
- 1905: Jean-Antoine Injalbert (1845–1933)
- 1933: Henri Bouchard (1875–1960)
- 1961: Raymond Martin (1910–1992)
- 1992: Claude Abeille (born 1930)

== Seat #3 ==
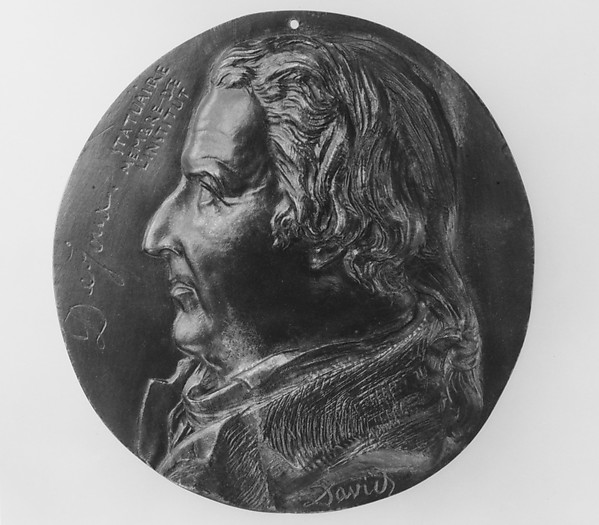
Claude Dejoux

- 1795: Claude Dejoux (1731–1816)
- 1816: Jacques-Philippe Le Sueur (1757–1830)
- 1831: Jean-Baptiste Roman (1792–1835)
- 1835: Louis-Messidor Petitot (1794–1862)
- 1862: Eugène Guillaume (1822–1905)
- 1905: André-Joseph Allar (1845–1926)
- 1926: Paul Landowski (1875–1961)
- 1962: Louis Dideron (1901–1980)
- 1981: Nicolas Schöffer (1912–1992)
- 1992: François Stahly (1911–2006)
- 2013: Jean Anguera (born 1953)

== Seat #4 ==
- 1809: François-Frédéric Lemot (1772–1827)
- 1827: Jean-Jacques Pradier (1790–1852)
- 1852: Pierre-Charles Simart (1808–1857)
- 1857: François Jouffroy (1806–1882)
- 1882: Alexandre Falguière (1831–1900)
- 1900: Jules Coutan (1848–1939)
- 1939: Alexandre Descatoire (1874–1949)
- 1950: Claude Grange (1883–1971)
- 1973: Georges Hilbert (1900–1982)

This seat was transferred to section VII in 1985.

== Seat #5 ==
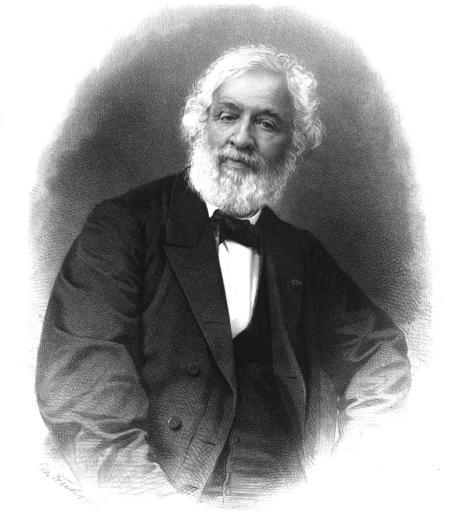
Charles-François Lebœuf

- 1810: Pierre Cartellier (1757–1831)
- 1831: Charles-François Lebœuf (1792–1865)
- 1865: Jean-Joseph Perraud (1819–1876)
- 1876: Paul Dubois (1829–1905)
- 1905: René de Saint-Marceaux (1845–1915)
- 1917: Georges Gardet (1863–1939)
- 1939: Félix-Alexandre Desruelles (1865–1943)
- 1943: Léon-Ernest Drivier (1878–1951)
- 1951: Armand Martial (1884–1960)
- 1961: Alfred Janniot (1889–1969)
- 1970: Étienne Martin (1913–1995)
- 1999: Eugène Dodeigne (1923–2015)
- 2018: Jean-Michel Othoniel (born 1964)

== Seat #6 ==
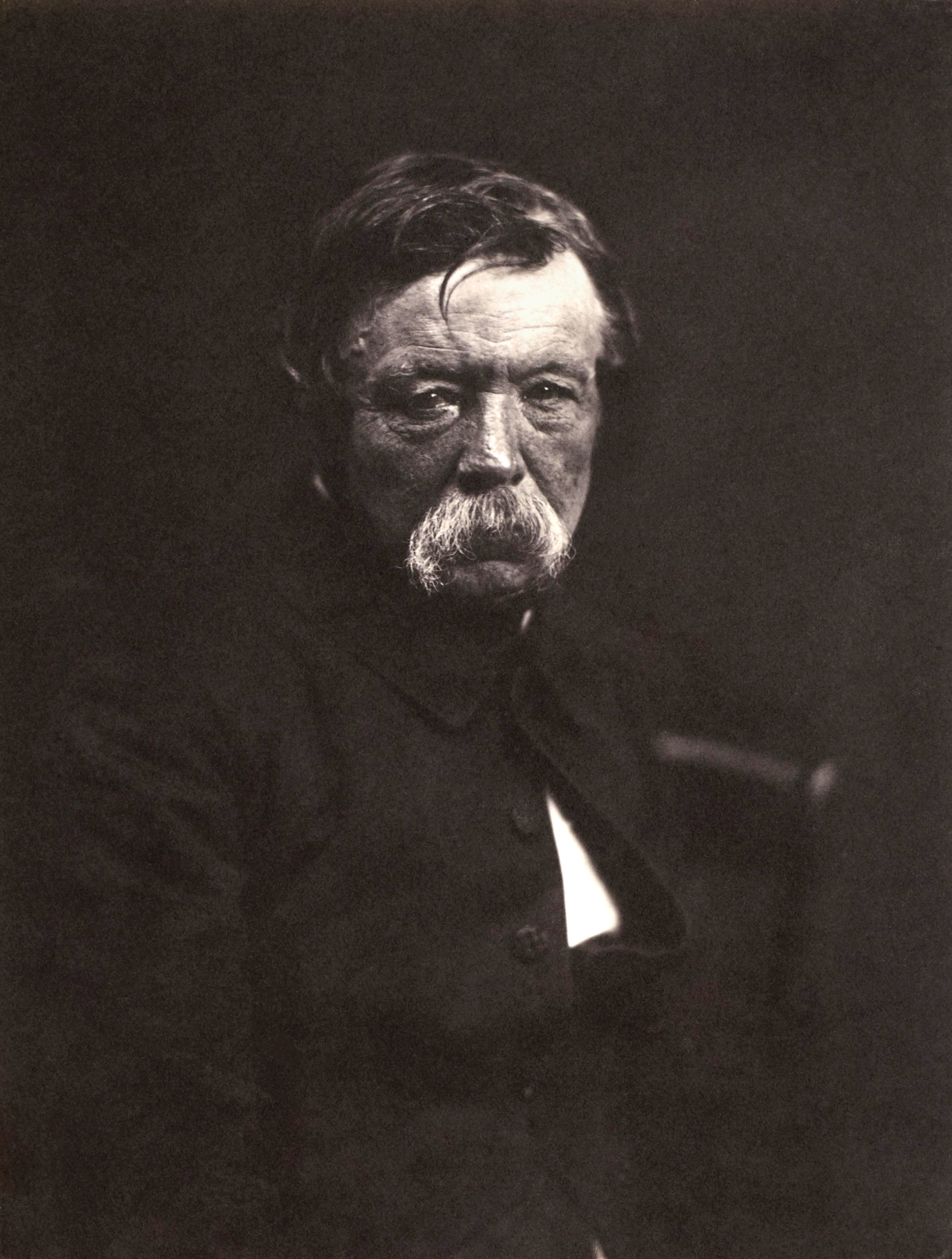
David d'Angers

- 1810: Félix Lecomte (1737–1817)
- 1817: Jean-Baptiste Stouf (1743–1826)
- 1826: David d'Angers (1789–1856)
- 1856: Jean-Louis Jaley (1802–1866)
- 1866: Jean-Marie Bonnassieux (1810–1892)
- 1892: Emmanuel Frémiet (1824–1910)
- 1910: Raoul Verlet (1857–1923)
- 1924: François-Léon Sicard (1862–1934)
- 1935: Paul Gasq (1860–1944)
- 1944: Marcel Gaumont (1880–1962)
- 1964: Jean Carton (1911–1988)
- 1990: Gérard Lanvin (1923-2018)
- 2021: Anne Poirier (born 1942)

== Seat #7 ==
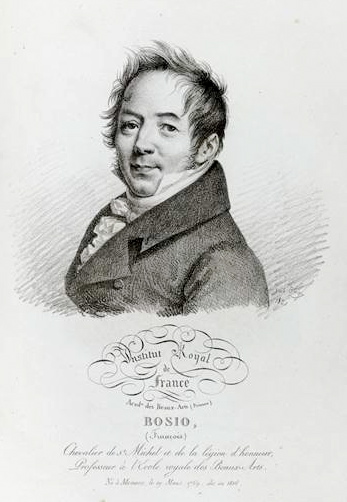
François Joseph Bosio

- 1816: François Joseph Bosio (1768–1845)
- 1845: Philippe Joseph Henri Lemaire (1798–1880)
- 1880: Henri Chapu (1833–1891)
- 1891: Antonin Mercié (1845–1916)
- 1919: Jean Dampt (1854–1945)
- 1946: Lucien Brasseur (1878–1960)
- 1961: Henri-Édouard Navarre (1885–1971)
- 1973: Hubert Yencesse (1900–1987)
- 1989: Albert Féraud (1921–2008)
- 2008: Pierre-Édouard (born 1959)

== Seat #8 ==
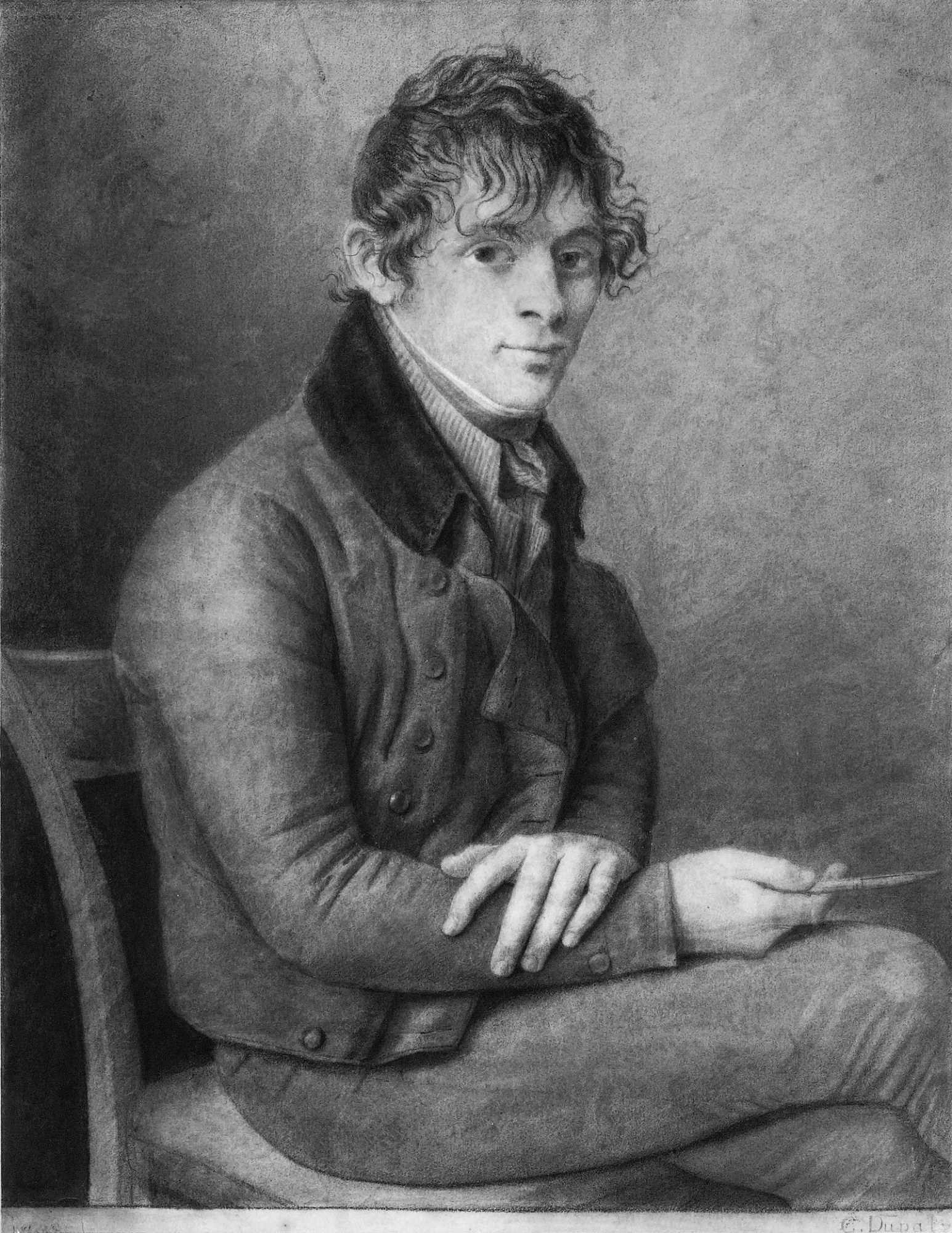
Charles Dupaty

- 1816: Charles Dupaty (1771–1825)
- 1825: Jean-Pierre Cortot (1787–1843)
- 1843: Francisque Joseph Duret (1804–1865)
- 1865: Jules Cavelier (1814–1894)
- 1894: Laurent Marqueste (1848–1920)
- 1920: Hippolyte Lefebvre (1863–1935)
- 1936: Jean Boucher (1870–1939)
- 1941: Louis-Aimé Lejeune (1884–1969)
- 1969: Louis Leygue (1905–1992)
- 1993: Antoine Poncet (born 1928)

== Seat #9 ==
- 2007: Brigitte Terziev (born 1943)

== Sources ==
- List of members @ the Académie des Beaux-Arts website.

== See also ==
- List of Académie des Beaux-Arts members: Painting
- List of Académie des Beaux-Arts members: Architecture
- List of Académie des Beaux-Arts members: Engraving
- List of Académie des Beaux-Arts members: Music
- List of Académie des Beaux-Arts members: Unattached
- List of Académie des Beaux-Arts members: Cinema
