= Achille Jacquet =

French engraver (1846–1908)

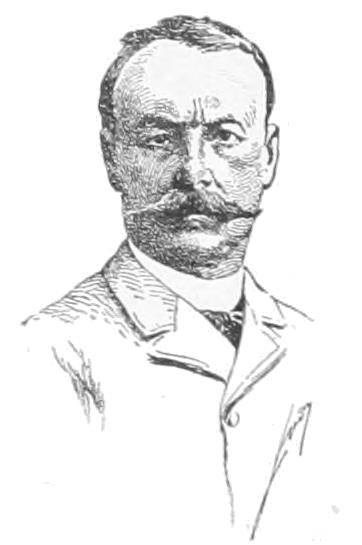
Achille Jacquet, from Larousse Mensuel Illustré (1906)

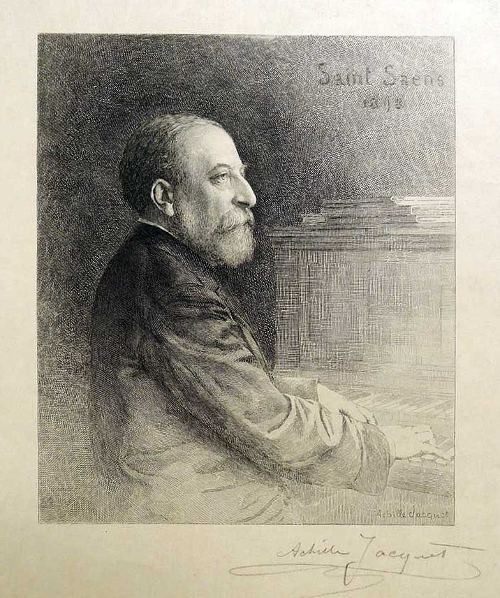
Camille Saint-Saëns at the Piano

Achille Jacquet (28 July 1846, Courbevoie – 30 October 1908, Paris) was a French engraver.

== Life and work ==
From 1865 to 1870, he attended the Académie des Beaux-Arts, where he studied with Louis Pierre Henriquel-Dupont, Alexandre Laemlein, and Isidore Pils. His first public exhibit was at the Salon of 1868, where he displayed his engraving of "David and Goliath", by Daniele da Volterra. Shortly after graduating, he won the Prix de Rome for his work with a burin.

He continued to exhibit at the Salon; acquiring a third-class medal (Salon of 1877), second-class medal (Salon of 1881) and, finally, a first-class medal (Salon of 1884). He was awarded a Medal of Honor at the Exposition Universelle of 1889.

In 1892, he was elected to the Académie des Beaux-Arts, where he took Seat #2 for engraving; succeeding his teacher, Henriquel-Dupont. In 1906, he would serve as the Académie's President. Meanwhile, in 1900, he was named a Knight in the Legion of Honor.

Most of his works were interpretations of paintings by 19th-century French masters, notably Alexandre Cabanel and Ernest Meissonier, but he also created original portraits. These include Félix Faure, Camille Saint-Saëns, and Jules Janssen.

His older brother, Jules Jacquet, was also an engraver.
