= List of Académie des Beaux-Arts members: Music =

This is a list of past and present members of the Académie des Beaux-Arts in section V: Musical composition.

== Seat #1 ==
Étienne Nicolas Méhul

- elected 1795: Étienne Nicolas Méhul (1763–1817)
- 1817: François-Adrien Boïeldieu (1776–1834)
- 1835: Antoine Reicha (1770–1836)
- 1836: Jacques Fromental Halévy (1799–1862)
- 1854: Louis Clapisson (1808–1866)
- 1866: Charles Gounod (1818–1893)
- 1894: Théodore Dubois (1837–1924)
- 1924: Gabriel Pierné (1863–1937)
- 1938: Henri Busser (1872–1973)
- 1975: Marcel Landowski (1915–1999)
- 2000: Laurent Petitgirard (born 1950)

== Seat #2 ==
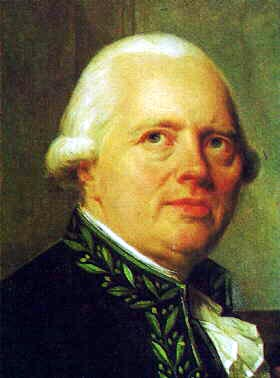
François-Joseph Gossec

- 1795: François-Joseph Gossec (1733–1829)
- 1829: Daniel Auber (1782–1871)
- 1872: Victor Massé (1822–1884)
- 1884: Léo Delibes (1836–1891)
- 1891: Ernest Guiraud (1837–1892)
- 1892: Émile Paladilhe (1844–1926)
- 1926: André Messager (1853–1929)
- 1929: Alfred Bachelet (1864–1944)
- 1945: Reynaldo Hahn (1875–1947)
- 1947: Marcel Samuel-Rousseau (1882–1955)
- 1956: Marcel Dupré (1886–1971)
- 1972: Darius Milhaud (1892–1974)
- 1975: Henri Sauguet (1901–1989)
- 1990: Jean Prodromidès (1927–2016)
- 2017: Bruno Mantovani (born 1974)

== Seat #3 ==
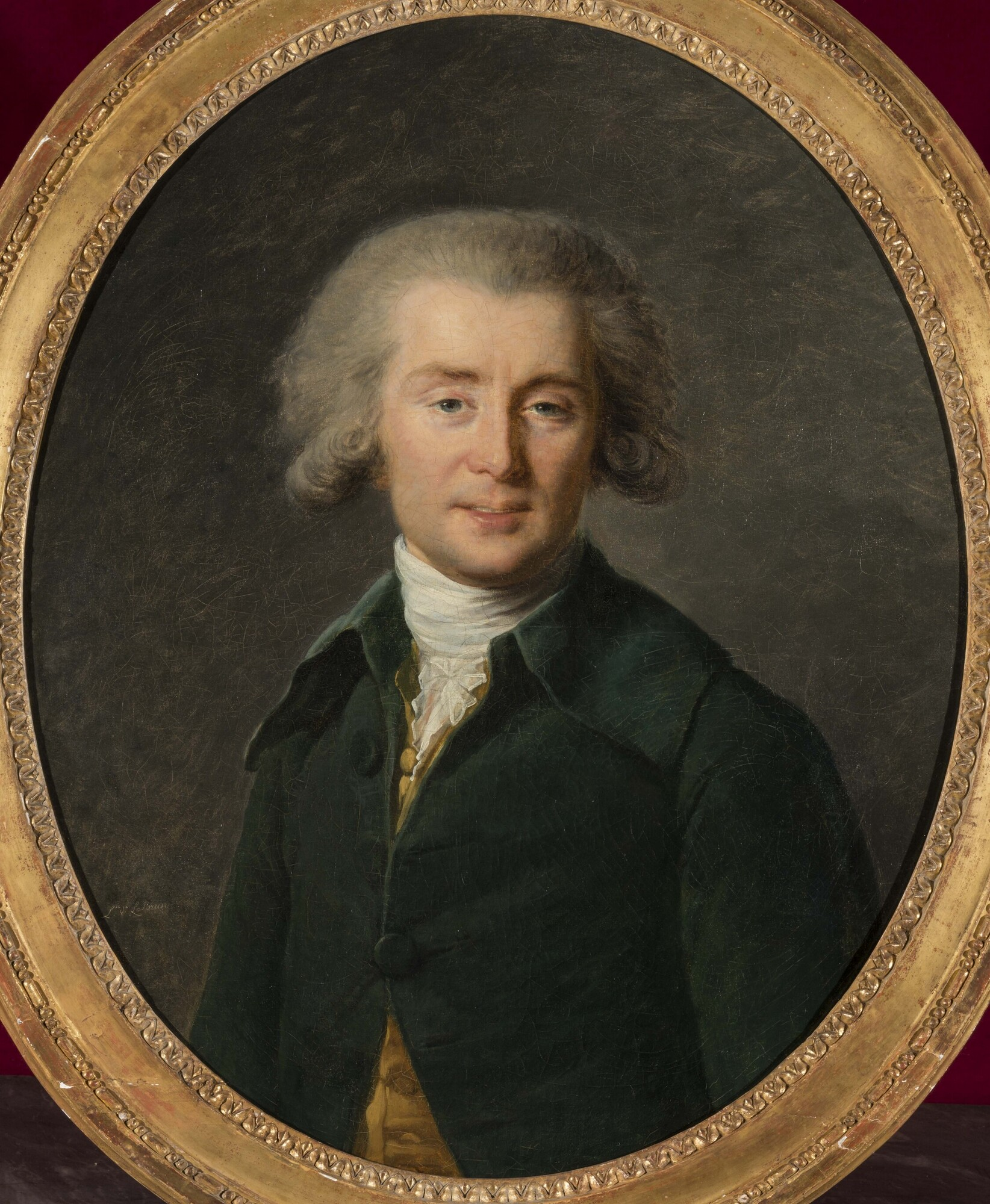
André Grétry

- 1795: André Grétry (1741–1813)
- 1813: Pierre-Alexandre Monsigny (1773–1817)
- 1817: Charles Simon Catel (1773–1830)
- 1831: Ferdinando Paër (1772–1839)
- 1839: Gaspare Spontini (1779–1851)
- 1851: Ambroise Thomas (1811–1896)
- 1896: Charles Lenepveu (1840–1910)
- 1910: Charles-Marie Widor (1844–1937)
- 1918: Henri Rabaud (1873–1949)
- 1950: Paul Paray (1886–1979)
- 1980: Raymond Gallois-Montbrun (1918–1994)
- 1995: Jean-Louis Florentz (1947–2004)
- 2009: Michaël Levinas (born 1949)

== Seat #4 ==
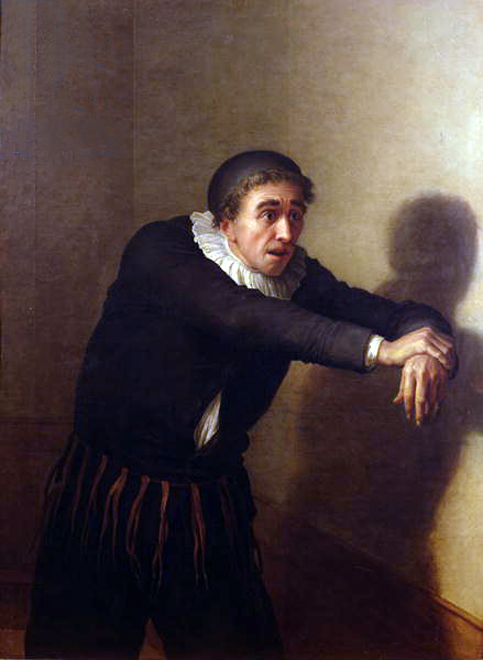
Grandmesnil

- 1796: Grandmesnil (Jean-Baptiste Fauchard, 1737–1816)
- 1816: Henri Montan Berton (1767–1844)
- 1844: Adolphe Adam (1803–1856)
- 1856: Hector Berlioz (1803–1869)
- 1869: Félicien David (1810–1897)
- 1876: Ernest Reyer (1823–1909)
- 1909: Gabriel Fauré (1845–1924)
- 1925: Alfred Bruneau (1857–1934)
- 1934: Paul Dukas (1865–1935)
- 1936: Florent Schmitt (1870–1958)
- 1959: Emmanuel Bondeville (1898–1987)
- 1989: Serge Nigg (1924–2008)
- 2013: Gilbert Amy (born 1936)

== Seat #5 ==
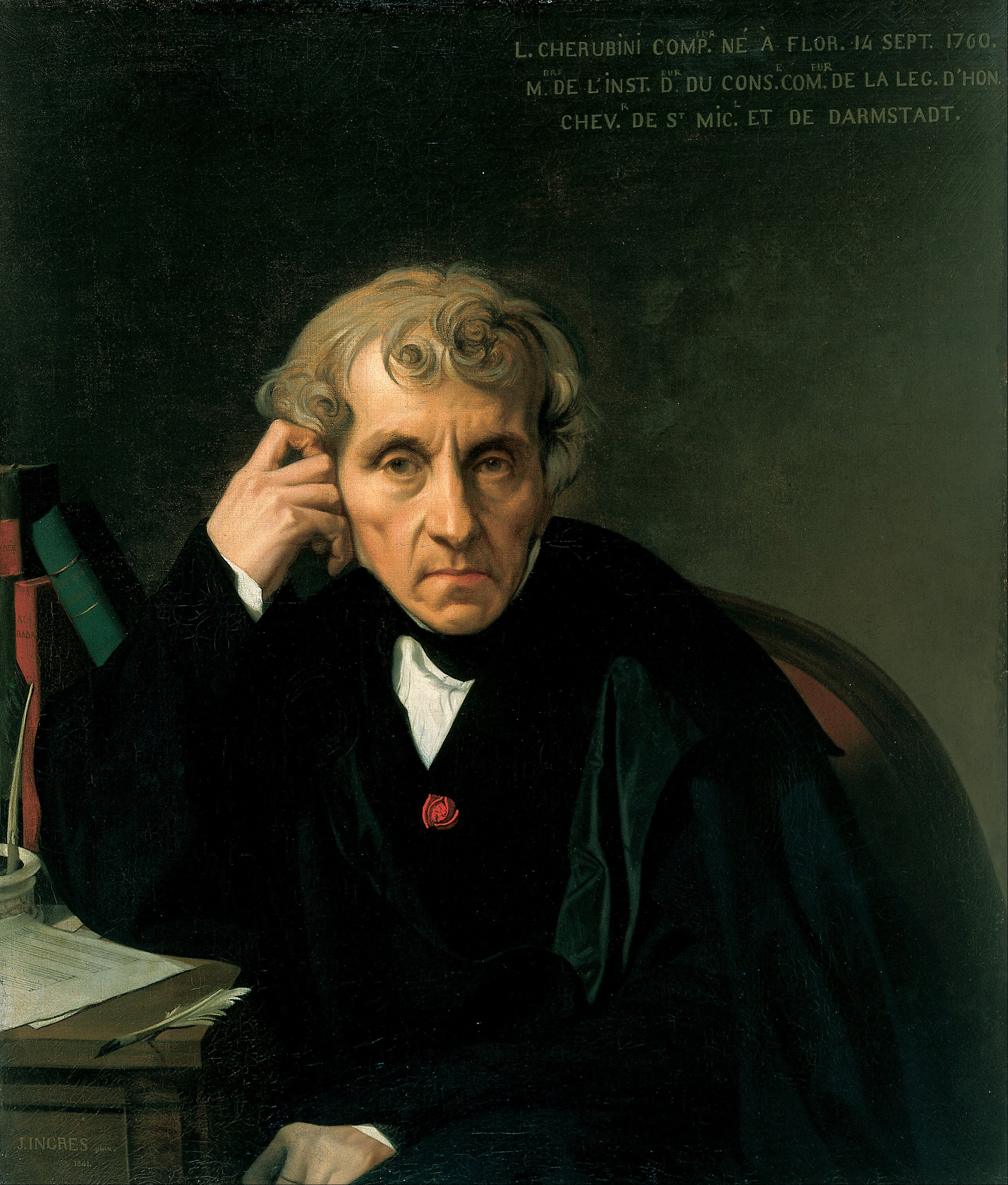
Luigi Cherubini

- 1815: Luigi Cherubini (1760–1842)
- 1842: George Onslow (1784–1853)
- 1853: Napoléon Henri Reber (1807–1880)
- 1881: Camille Saint-Saëns (1835–1921)
- 1922: Georges Hüe (1858–1948)
- 1949: Guy Ropartz (1864–1955)
- 1956: Jacques Ibert (1890–1962)
- 1962: Georges Auric (1899–1983)
- 1983: Iannis Xenakis (1921–2001)
- 2002: François-Bernard Mâche (born 1935)

== Seat #6 ==
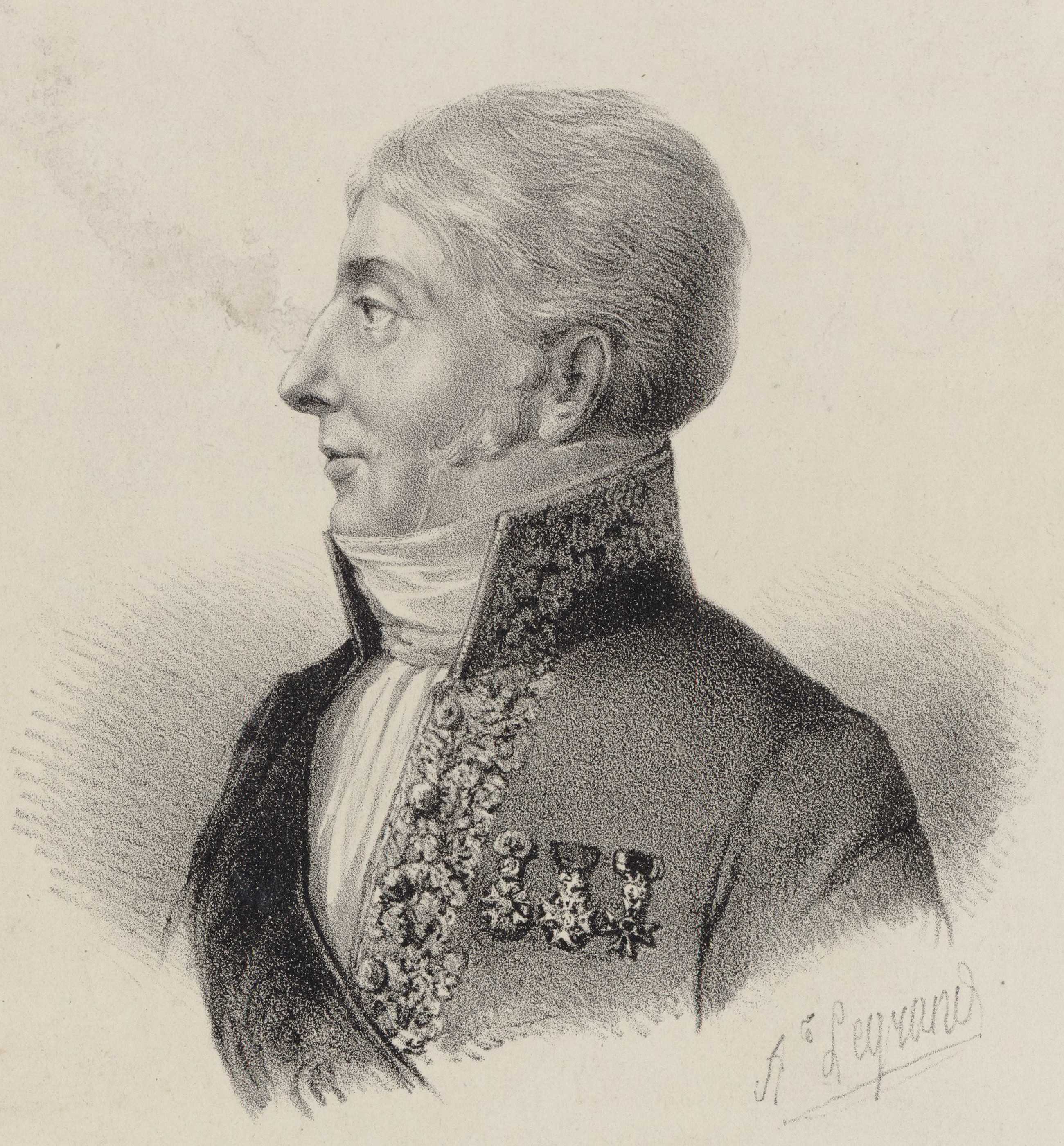
Jean-François Lesueur

- 1815: Jean-François Lesueur (1760–1834)
- 1837: Michele Carafa (1787–1872)
- 1873: François Bazin (1816–1878)
- 1878: Jules Massenet (1842–1912)
- 1912: Gustave Charpentier (1860–1956)
- 1956: Louis Aubert (1877–1968)
- 1969: Tony Aubin (1907–1981)
- 1982: Jean-Yves Daniel-Lesur (1908–2002)
- 2005: Édith Canat de Chizy (born 1950)

== Seat #7 ==
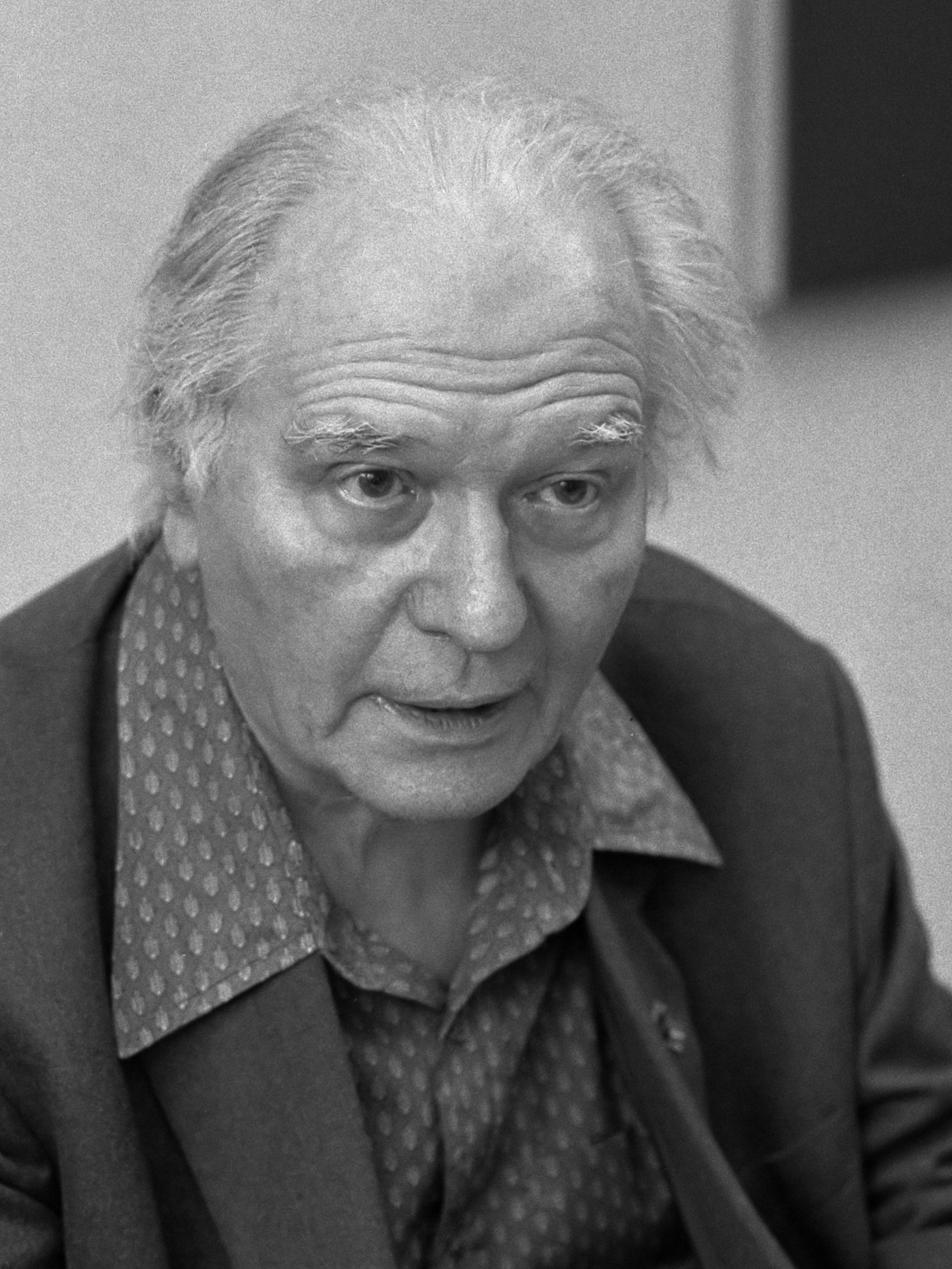
Olivier Messiaen

- 1967: Olivier Messiaen (1908–1992)
- 1992: Marius Constant (1925–2004)
- 2005: Charles Chaynes (1925–2016)
- 2016: Régis Campo (born 1968)

== Seat #8 ==
- 1999: Charles Trenet (1913–2001)
- 2001: Jacques Taddei (1946–2012)
- 2013: Thierry Escaich (born 1965)

== Sources ==
- List of members @ the Académie des Beaux-Arts website.

== See also ==
- List of Académie des Beaux-Arts members: Painting
- List of Académie des Beaux-Arts members: Sculpture
- List of Académie des Beaux-Arts members: Architecture
- List of Académie des Beaux-Arts members: Engraving
- List of Académie des Beaux-Arts members: Unattached
- List of Académie des Beaux-Arts members: Cinema
