= Rambert Dumarest =

French engraver and medallist

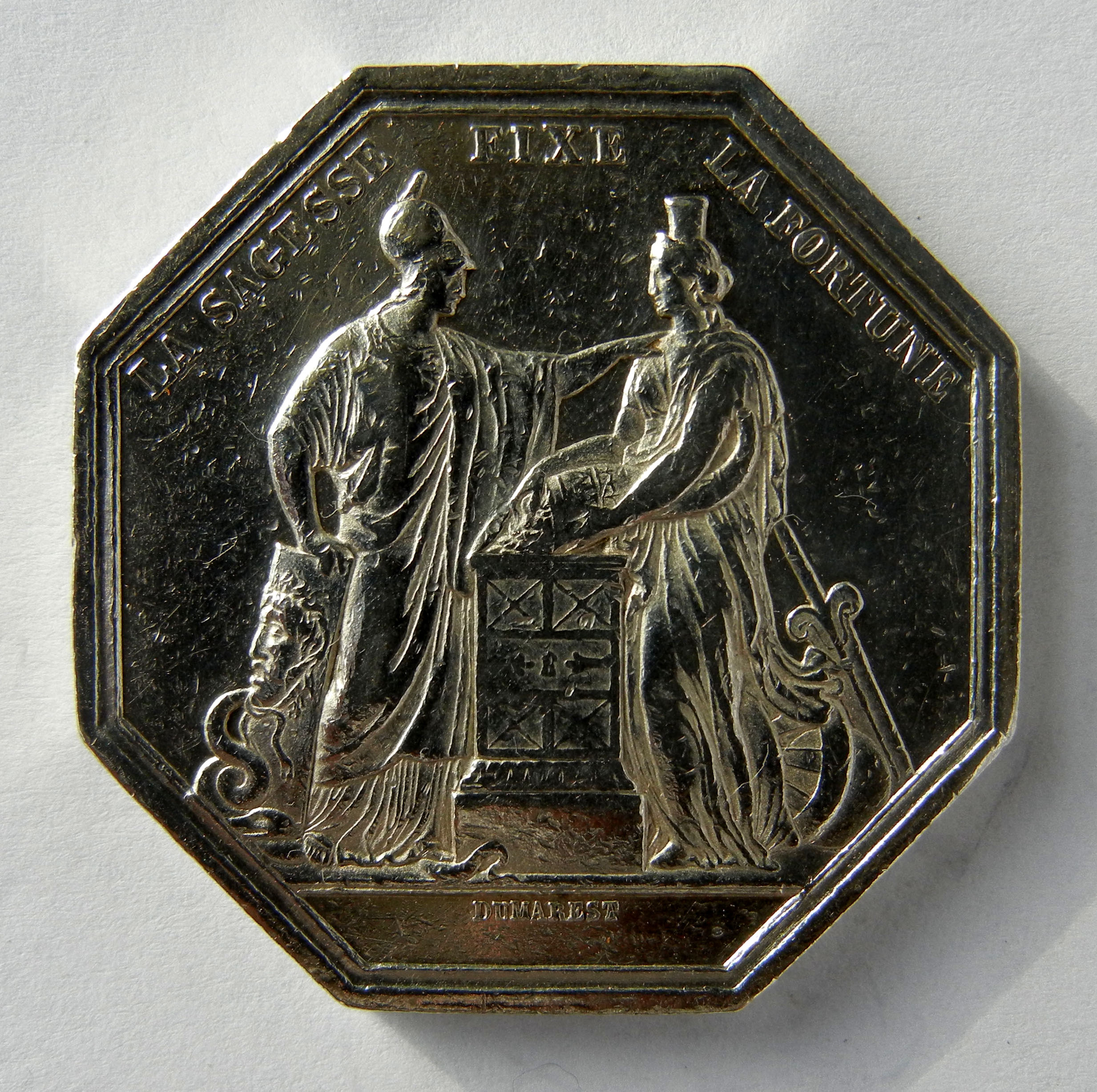
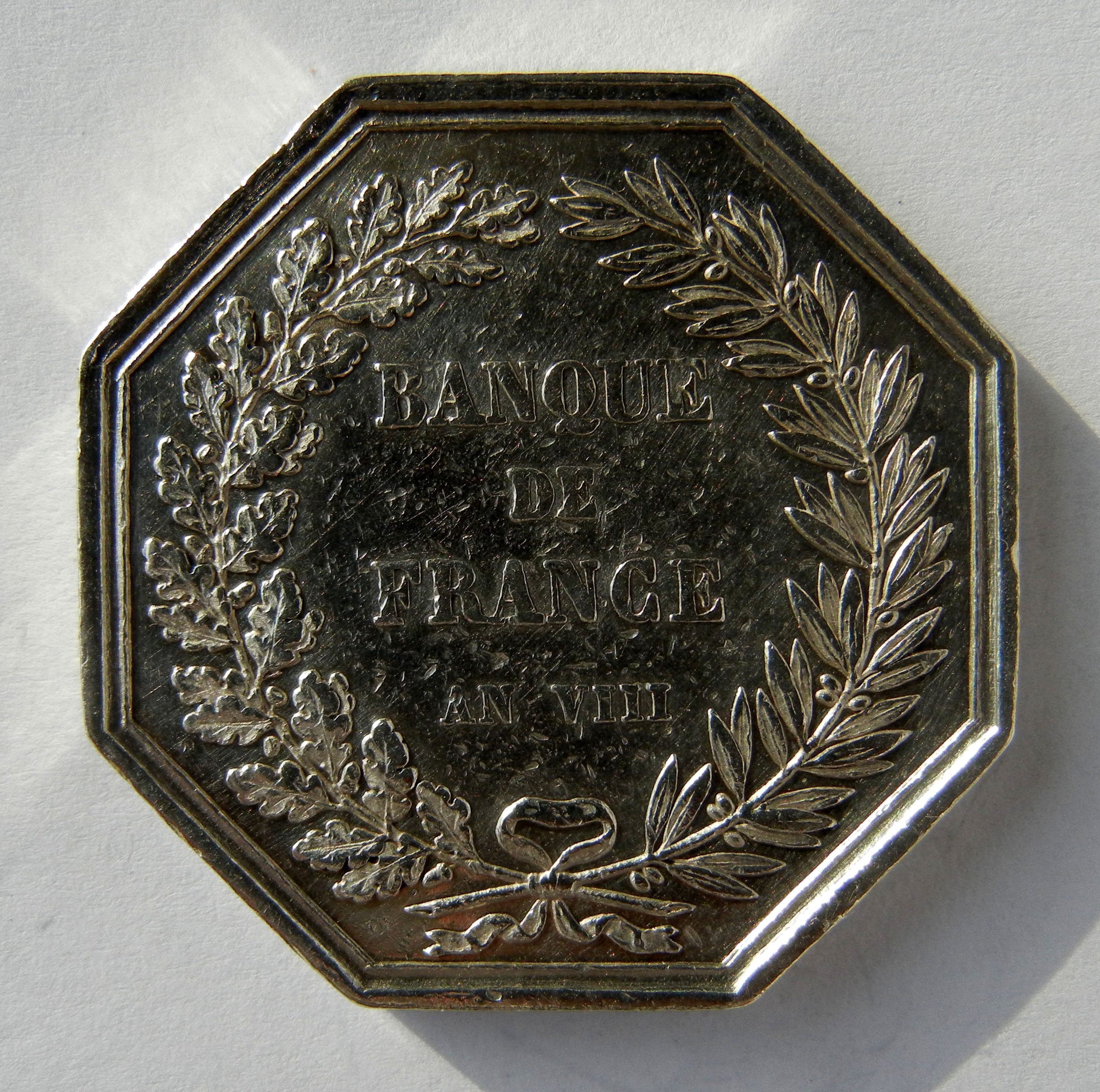
Banque de France (1799-1800): Wisdom Fixes Fortune

Rambert Dumarest (17 September 1750, Saint-Étienne - 4 April 1806, Paris) was a French engraver and medallist.

== Life and work ==
He was the son of an arquebusier. After starting as a draftsman, he became a gun engraver at the Manufacture d'armes de Saint-Étienne, where he engraved crossguards and flintlocks. He also spent two years at the new Soho Manufactory, in England.

Upon returning to Paris, he devoted himself to goldsmithing and jewellery, although he is best remembered for his medals. In 1800, he was elected to the Institut de France. Three years later, as a member of the Académie des Beaux-Arts, he became the first occupant of Seat #3 for engraving.

In 1795, he won the grand prize in a medal competition, for his profile of Jean-Jacques Rousseau. He also created notable medals for the Banque de France, the Sénat conservateur, and the Institut de France.

Some of his original medals may be seen at the Musée du vieux Saint-Étienne.
