= List of Académie des Beaux-Arts members: Painting =

This is a list of past and present members of the Académie des Beaux-Arts in Section I: Painting.

== Seat #1 ==
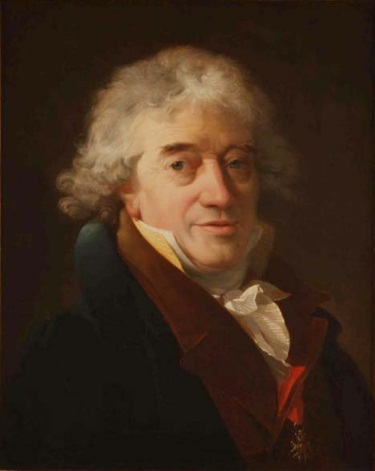
Gerard van Spaendonck

- elected 1795: Gérard van Spaendonck (1746–1822)
- 1822: Louis Hersent (1777–1860)
- 1860: Émile Signol (1804–1892)
- 1892: Luc-Olivier Merson (1846–1920)
- 1921: Paul Chabas (1869–1937)
- 1938: Édouard Vuillard (1868–1940)
- 1941: Pierre Eugène Montézin (1874–1946)
- 1947: Charles Fouqueray (1871–1956)
- 1957: Yves Brayer (1907–1990)

This seat was transferred to section VII in 1998.

== Seat #2 ==
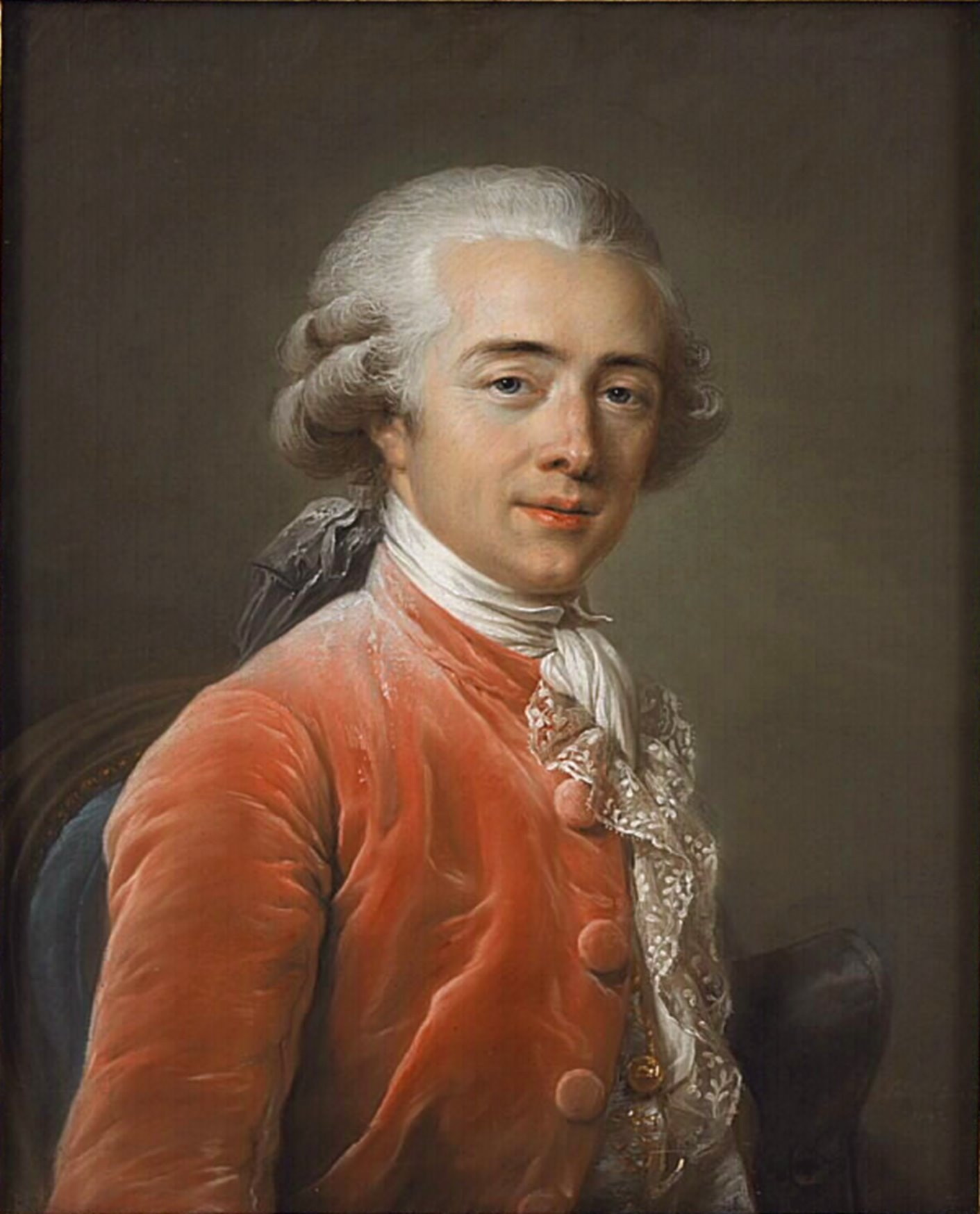
François Vincent

- 1795: François-André Vincent (1746–1816)
- 1816: Pierre-Paul Prud'hon (1763–1823)
- 1823: Jean-Joseph-Xavier Bidauld (1758–1846)
- 1846: Jacques Raymond Brascassat (1804–1867)
- 1867: Louis-Nicolas Cabat (1812–1893)
- 1893: Jean-Joseph Benjamin-Constant (1845–1902)
- 1902: Ferdinand Humbert (1842–1934)
- 1935: Émile Aubry (1880–1964)
- 1966: Félix Labisse (1905–1982)
- 1990: Pierre Carron (1932–2022)

== Seat #3 ==
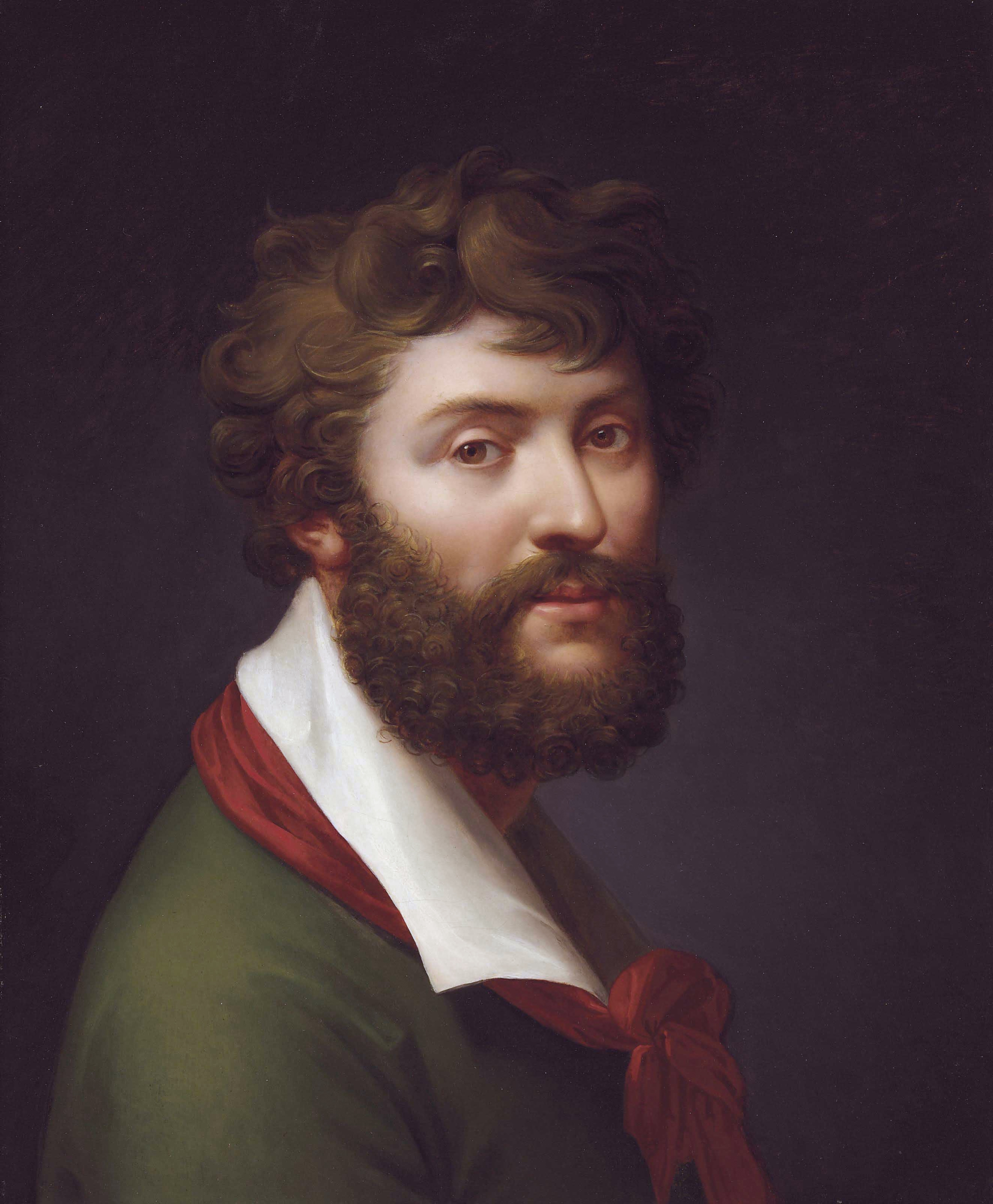
Jean-Baptiste Regnault

- 1795: Jean-Baptiste Regnault (1754–1829)
- 1829: François-Joseph Heim (1787–1865)
- 1865: Jean-Léon Gérôme (1824–1904)
- 1904: Carolus-Duran (1838–1917)
- 1919: Ernest Laurent (1859–1929)
- 1930: Henri Le Sidaner (1862–1939)
- 1941: Jean Dupas (1882–1964)

This seat was eliminated in 1967.

== Seat #4 ==
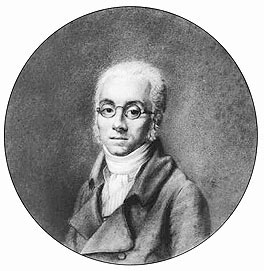
Nicolas-Antoine Taunay

- 1795: Nicolas-Antoine Taunay (1755–1830)
- 1830: François Marius Granet (1779–1849)
- 1850: Joseph-Nicolas Robert-Fleury (1797–1890)
- 1890: François-Louis Français (1814–1897)
- 1897: Antoine Vollon (1833–1900)
- 1900: Pascal Dagnan-Bouveret (1852–1929)
- 1930: Jean-Pierre Laurens (1875–1932)
- 1932: Georges Paul Leroux (1877–1957)
- 1958: Georges Cheyssial (1907–1997)
- 1999: Olivier Debré (1920–1999)
- 2001: Jean Cortot (1925–2018)

== Seat #5 ==
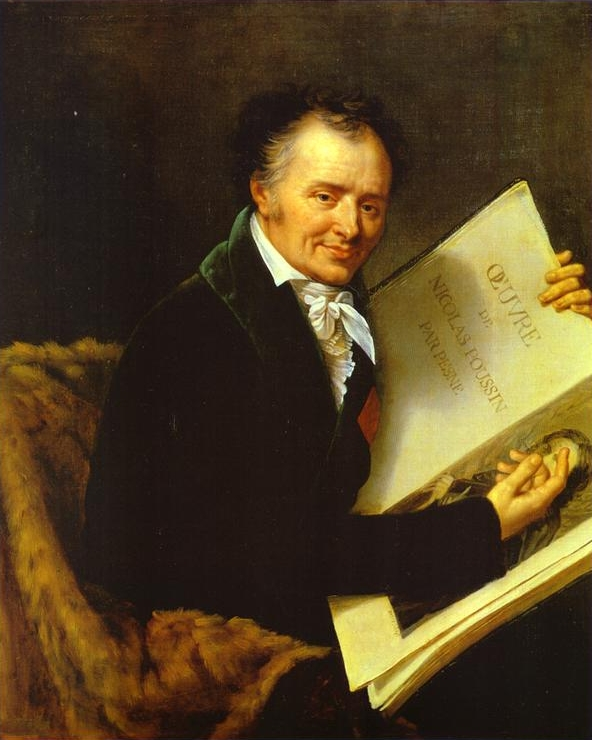
Vivant Denon

- 1803: Vivant Denon (1747–1825)
- 1825: Jean-Dominique Ingres (1781–1867)
- 1867: Alexandre Hesse (1806–1879)
- 1879: Jules-Élie Delaunay (1828–1891)
- 1891: Jules Joseph Lefebvre (1834–1911)
- 1912: Paul-Albert Besnard (1849–1934)
- 1935: Fernand Sabatté (1874–1940)
- 1941: Louis-François Biloul (1874–1947)
- 1948: Edmond Heuzé (1889–1967)
- 1968: Georges Rohner (1913–2000)
- 2015: Philippe Garel (born 1945)

== Seat #6 ==
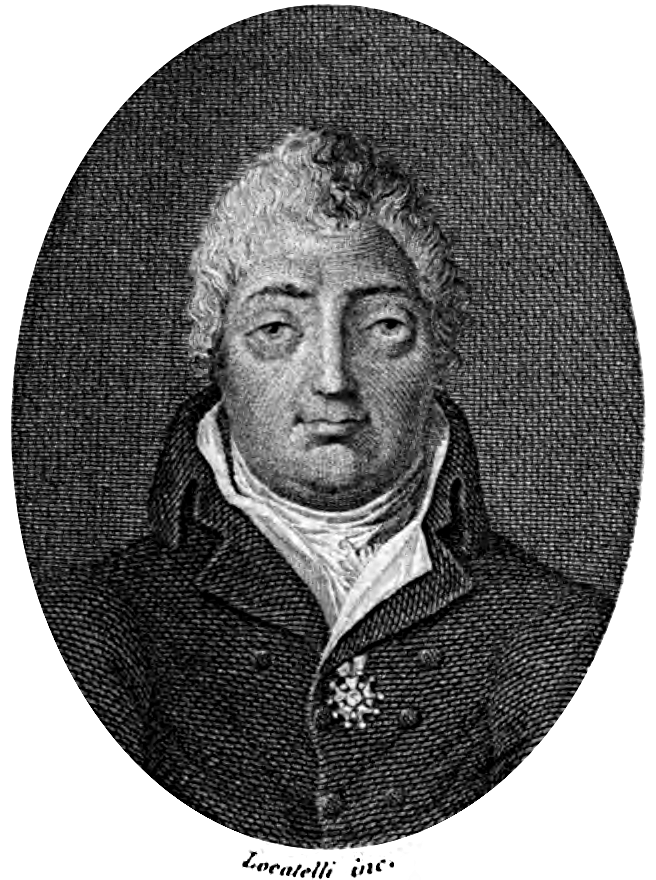
Ennio Quirino Visconti

- 1803: Ennio Quirino Visconti (1751–1818)
- 1818: Guillaume Guillon-Lethière (1760–1832)
- 1832: Merry-Joseph Blondel (1781–1853)
- 1853: Jean-Hippolyte Flandrin (1809–1864)
- 1864: Charles Louis Müller (1815–1892)
- 1892: Édouard Detaille (1848–1912)
- 1913: Marcel Baschet (1862–1941)
- 1942: Robert Poughéon (1886–1955)
- 1955: Alfred Giess (1901–1973)
- 1975: Georges Mathieu (1921–2012)
- 2017: Gérard Garouste (born 1946)

== Seat #7 ==
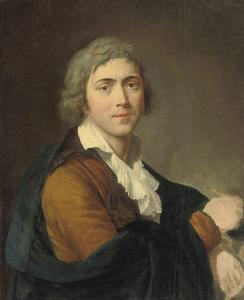
François-Guillaume Ménageot

- 1809: François-Guillaume Ménageot (1744–1816)
- 1816: Étienne-Barthélémy Garnier (1759–1849)
- 1849: Léon Cogniet (1794–1880)
- 1881: Léon Bonnat (1833–1922)
- 1923: Jean-Louis Forain (1852–1931)
- 1932: Maurice Denis (1870–1943)
- 1945: Paul Jouve (1878–1973)
- 1974: Bernard Buffet (1928–1999)
- 2005: Vladimir Veličković (1935–2019)
- 2021: Ernest Pignon-Ernest (born 1942)

== Seat #8 ==
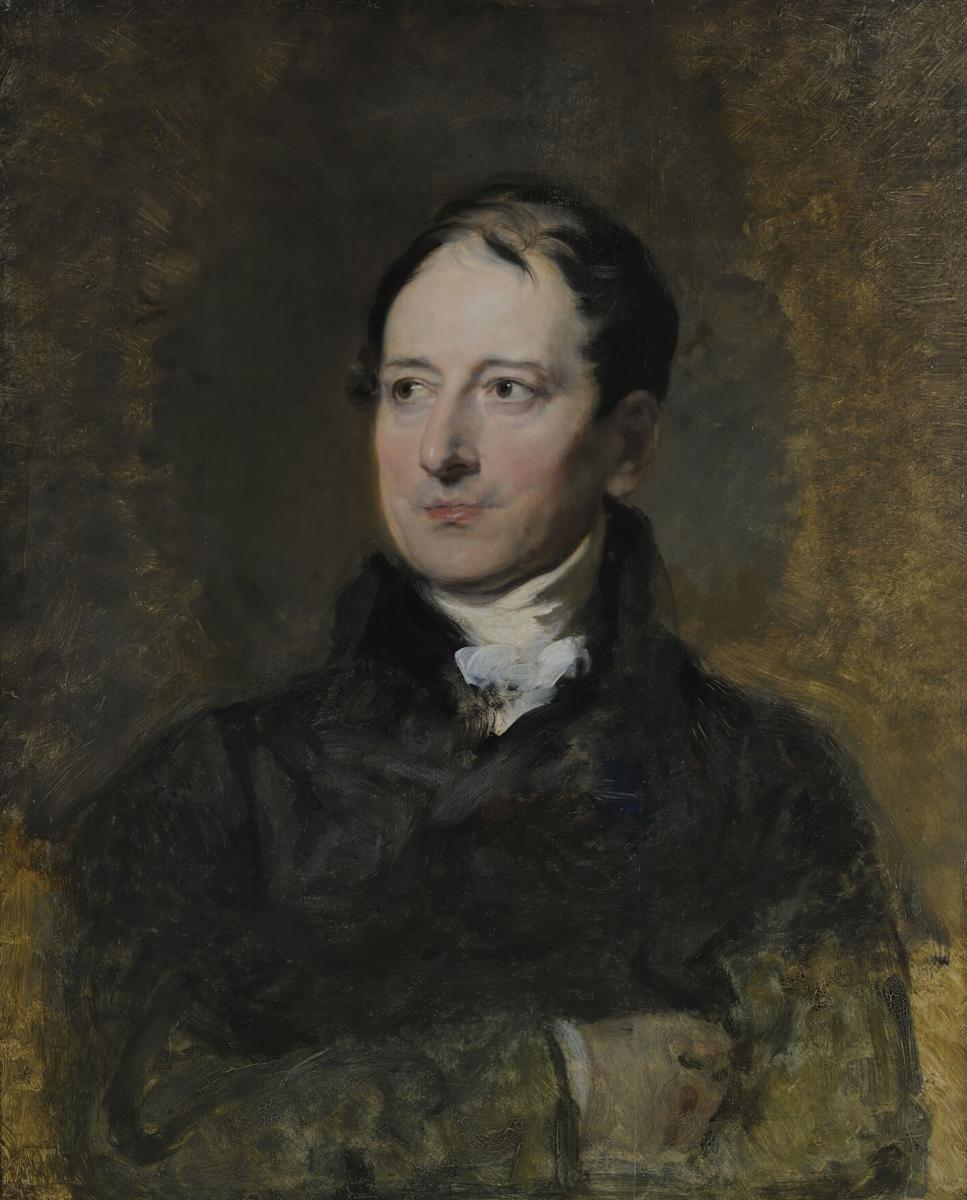
François Gérard

- 1812: François Gérard (1770–1837)
- 1837: Jean-Victor Schnetz (1787–1870)
- 1870: Paul Baudry (1828–1886)
- 1886: Jules Breton (1827–1906)
- 1906: Gabriel Ferrier (1847–1914)
- 1917: Henri Jean Guillaume Martin (1860–1943)
- 1944: Gustave Louis Jaulmes (1873–1959)
- 1960: André Planson (1898–1981)
- 1983: Jean Bertholle (1909–1996)
- 1997: Guy de Rougemont (1935–2021)

== Seat #9 ==
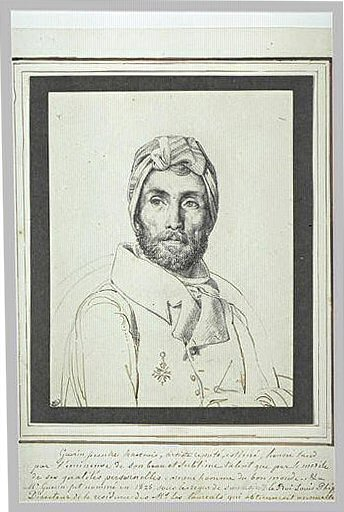
Pierre Guerin

- 1816: Pierre Guérin (1774–1833)
- 1833: Michel Martin Drolling (1786–1851)
- 1851: Jean Alaux (1786–1864)
- 1864: Henri Lehmann (1814–1882)
- 1882: Gustave Boulanger (1824–1888)
- 1888: Gustave Moreau (1826–1898)
- 1898: Aimé Morot (1850–1913)
- 1913: Henri Gervex (1852–1929)
- 1929: André Devambez (1867–1944)
- 1945: Willem van Hasselt (1882–1963)
- 1965: Édouard Goerg (1893–1969)
- 1969: Jacques Despierre (1912–1995)
- 1997: Chu Teh-Chun (1926–2014)
- 2018: Fabrice Hyber (born 1961)

== Seat #10 ==
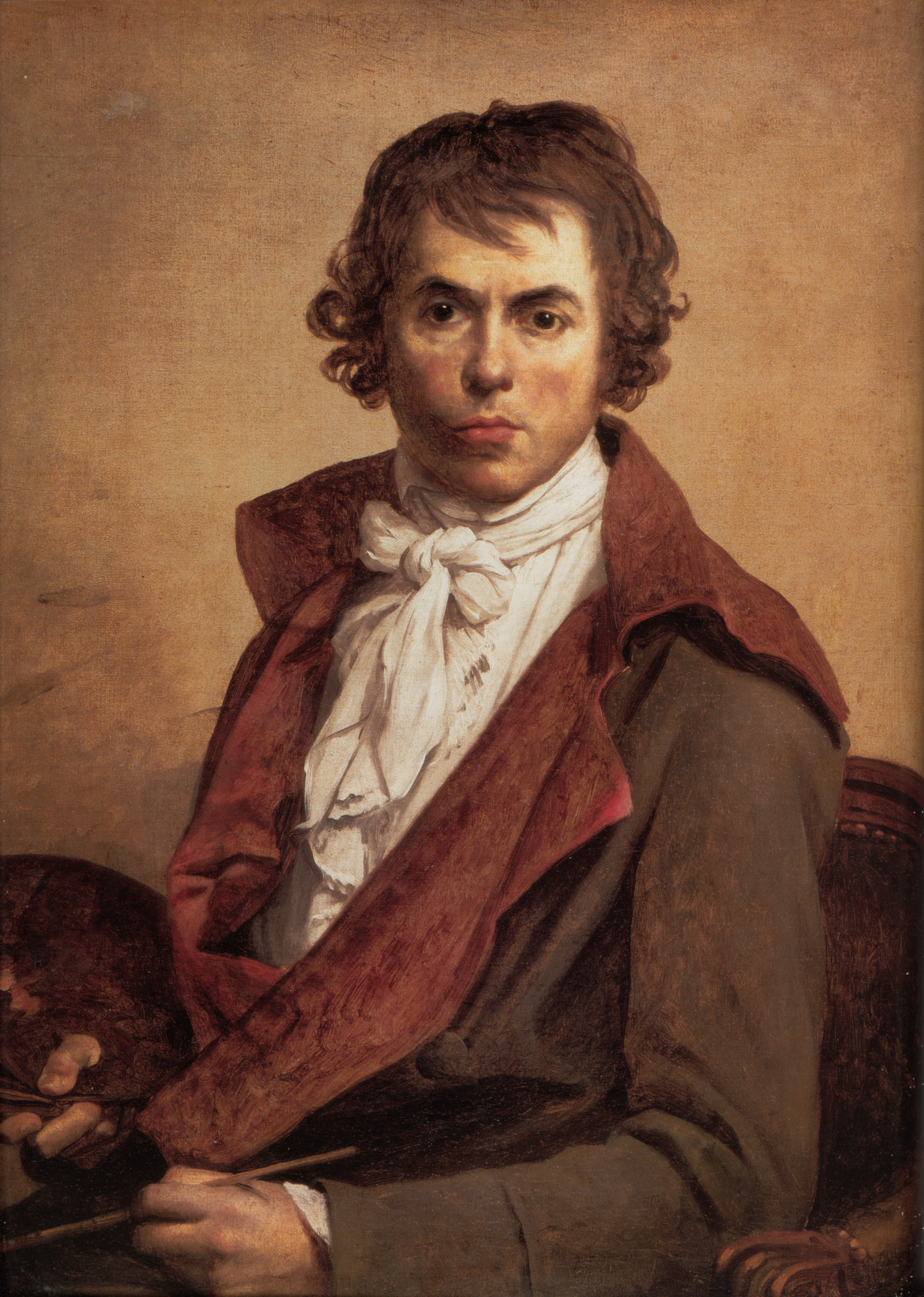
Jacques-Louis David

- 1803: Jacques-Louis David (1748–1825)
- 1816: Jean-Jacques-François Le Barbier (1738–1826)
- 1826: Horace Vernet (1789–1863)
- 1863: Alexandre Cabanel (1823–1889)
- 1889: Jean-Jacques Henner (1829–1905)
- 1905: Léon Augustin Lhermitte (1844–1925)
- 1926: Émile-René Ménard (1862–1930)
- 1930: George Desvallières (1861–1950)
- 1951: Jean Bouchaud (1891–1977)
- 1977: Jean Carzou (1907–2000)
- 2002: Zao Wou-Ki (1921–2013)
- 2016: Jean-Marc Bustamante (born 1952)

== Seat #11 ==
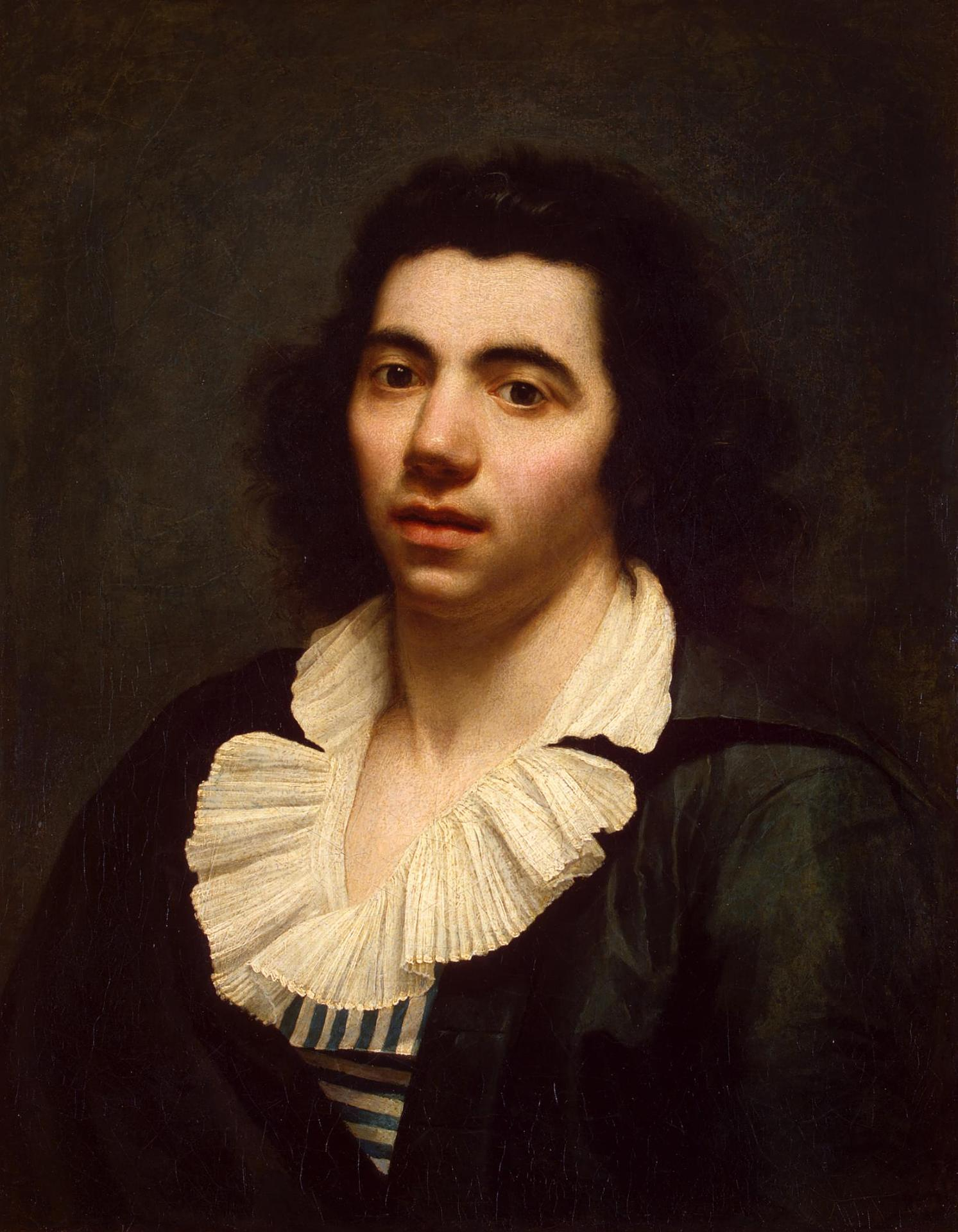
Anne-Louis Girodet

- 1816: Anne-Louis Girodet (1767–1824)
- 1825: Charles Thévenin (1764–1838)
- 1838: Jérôme-Martin Langlois (1779–1838)
- 1839: Auguste Couder (1790–1873)
- 1874: Ernest Hébert (1817–1908)
- 1909: Raphaël Collin (1850–1916)
- 1918: Adolphe Déchenaud (1868–1926)
- 1929: Lucien Simon (1861–1945)
- 1946: Jean Souverbie (1891–1981)
- 1984: Arnaud d'Hauterives (1933–2018)
- 2020: Catherine Meurisse (born 1980)
- 2025 Nina Childress (born 1961)

== Seat #12 ==
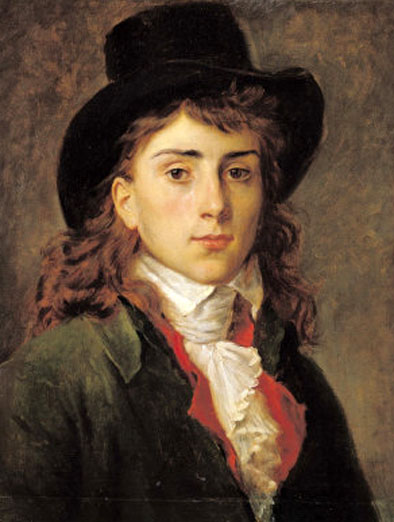
Antoine Gros

- 1816: Antoine Gros (1771–1835)
- 1835: Abel de Pujol (1787–1861)
- 1861: Jean-Louis-Ernest Meissonier (1815–1891)
- 1891: Jean-Paul Laurens (1838–1921)
- 1921: Jules-Alexis Muenier (1863–1942)
- 1943: René-Xavier Prinet (1861–1946)
- 1946: Nicolas Untersteller (1900–1967)
- 1968: Roger Chastel (1897–1981)
- 1982: Georges Wakhévitch (1907–1984)

This seat was transferred to section VII in 1987.

== Seat #13 ==
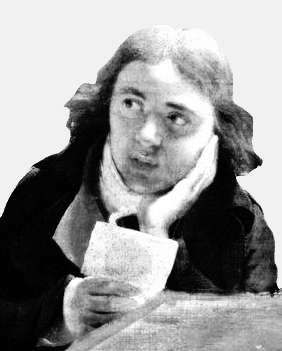
Charles Meynier

- 1816: Charles Meynier (1768–1832)
- 1832: Paul Delaroche (1797–1856)
- 1857: Eugène Delacroix (1798–1863)
- 1863: Nicolas-Auguste Hesse (1795–1869)
- 1869: Jules Eugène Lenepveu (1819–1898)
- 1898: Fernand Cormon (1845–1924)
- 1924: Edgar Maxence (1871–1954)
- 1955: Lucien Fontanarosa (1912–1975)
- 1977: Hans Hartung (1904–1989)
- 1991: Jean Dewasne (1921–1999)
- 2001: Yves Millecamps (born 1930)

== Seat #14 ==
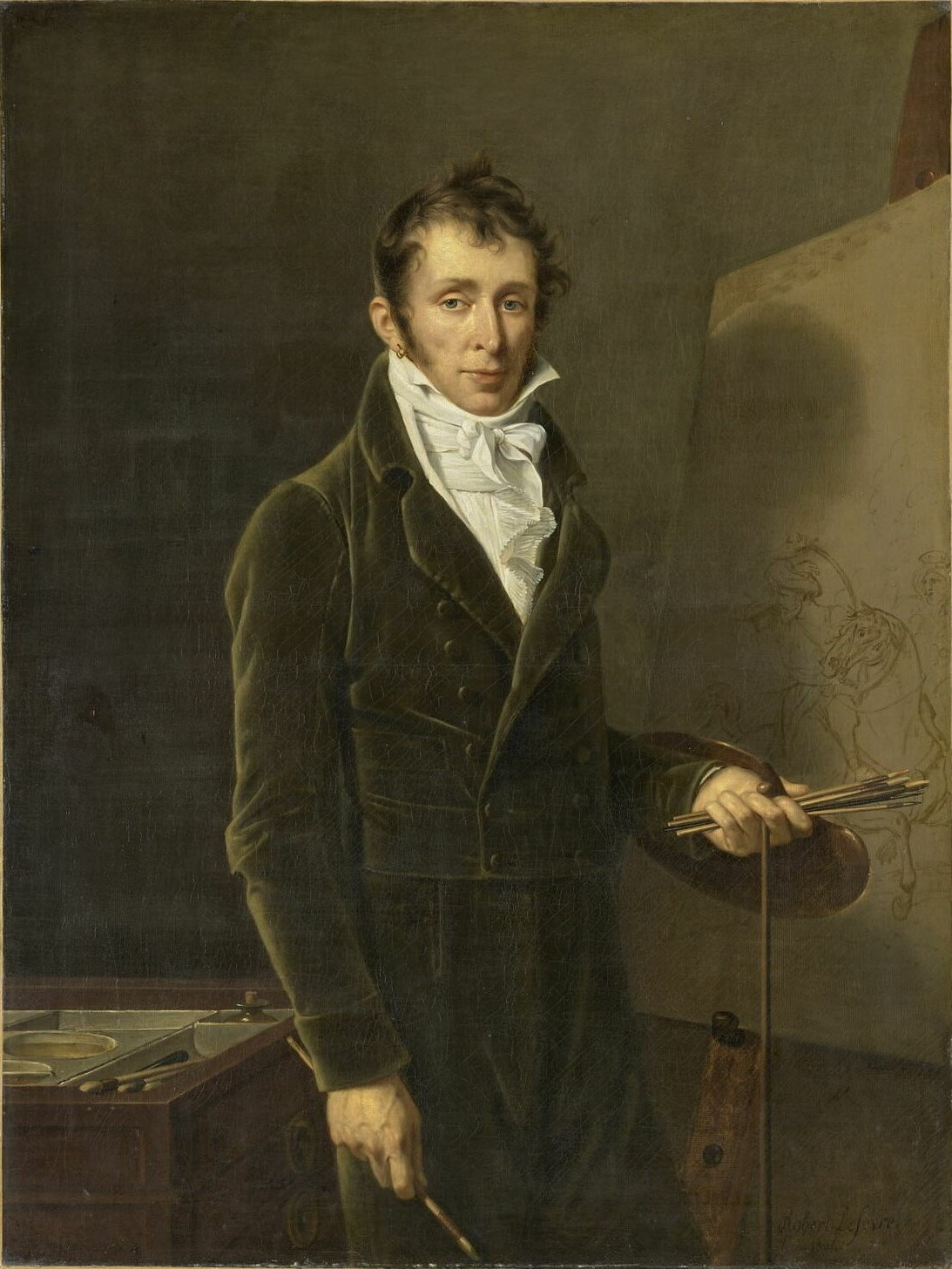
Carle Vernet

- 1816: Carle Vernet (1758–1836)
- 1836: François-Édouard Picot (1786–1868)
- 1868: Isidore Pils (1815–1875)
- 1876: William Bouguereau (1825–1905)
- 1905: François Flameng (1856–1923)
- 1923: Emile Friant (1863–1932)
- 1933: Paul Albert Laurens (1870–1934)
- 1935: Jacques-Émile Blanche (1861–1942)
- 1943: Louis-Marie Désiré-Lucas (1869–1949)
- 1950: Jean-Gabriel Domergue (1889–1962)
- 1964: Jean Lurçat (1892–1966)

This seat was eliminated in 1967.

== Sources ==
- List of members @ the Académie des Beaux-Arts website.

== See also ==
- List of Académie des Beaux-Arts members: Sculpture
- List of Académie des Beaux-Arts members: Architecture
- List of Académie des Beaux-Arts members: Engraving
- List of Académie des Beaux-Arts members: Music
- List of Académie des Beaux-Arts members: Unattached
- List of Académie des Beaux-Arts members: Cinema
