= List of Académie des Beaux-Arts members: Cinema =

This is a list of past and present members of the Académie des Beaux-Arts in section VII: Artistic creation in the cinema and audio-visual fields.

== Seat #1 ==
- elected 1975: Henri Sauguet (1901–1989)
- 1990: Jean Prodromidès (1927–2016)

This seat was transferred to section V in 1998.

== Seat #2 ==
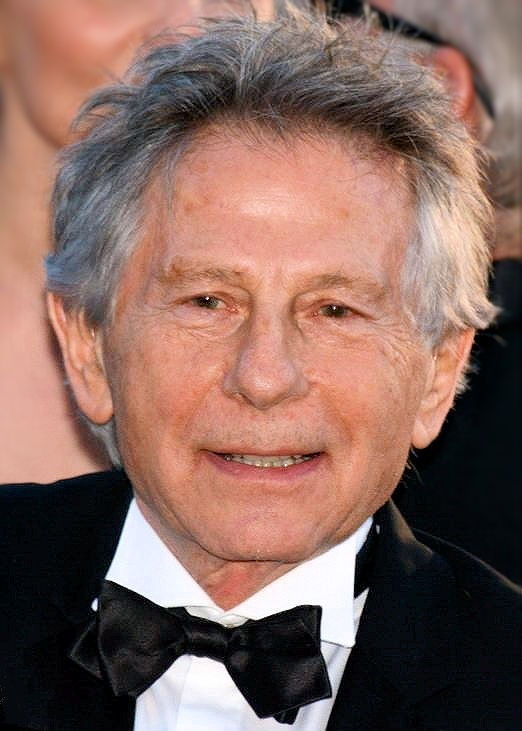
Roman Polanski

- 1979: Marcel Carné (1906–1996)
- 1998: Roman Polanski (born 1933)

== Seat #3 ==
- 1986: René Clément (1913–1996)
- 1998: Gérard Oury (1919–2006)
- 2007: Jean-Jacques Annaud (born 1943)

== Seat #4 ==
- 1988: Pierre Schoendoerffer (1928–2012)
- 2018: Coline Serreau (born 1947)

== Seat #5 ==
- 1988: Claude Autant-Lara (1901–2000)
- 2002: Francis Girod (1948–2006)
- 2016: Jacques Perrin (1941-2022)

== Seat #6 ==
- 1999: Henri Verneuil (1920–2002)
- 2007: Régis Wargnier (born 1947)

== Seat #7 ==
- 2000: Jeanne Moreau (1928–2017)
- 2019: Frédéric Mitterrand (1947–2024)

== Sources ==
- List of members @ the Académie des Beaux-Arts website.

== See also ==
- List of Académie des Beaux-Arts members: Painting
- List of Académie des Beaux-Arts members: Sculpture
- List of Académie des Beaux-Arts members: Architecture
- List of Académie des Beaux-Arts members: Engraving
- List of Académie des Beaux-Arts members: Music
- List of Académie des Beaux-Arts members: Unattached
