= Maximilien Joseph Hurtault =

French architect (1765–1824)

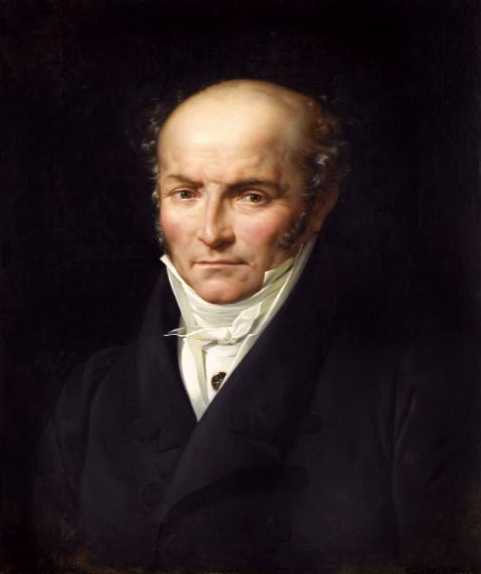
- Maximilien Joseph Hurtault, by Merry-Joseph Blondel (after 1800)
- Born: 8 June 1765; Huningue, France
- Died: 2 May 1824 (aged 58); Paris, France
- Occupation: Architect

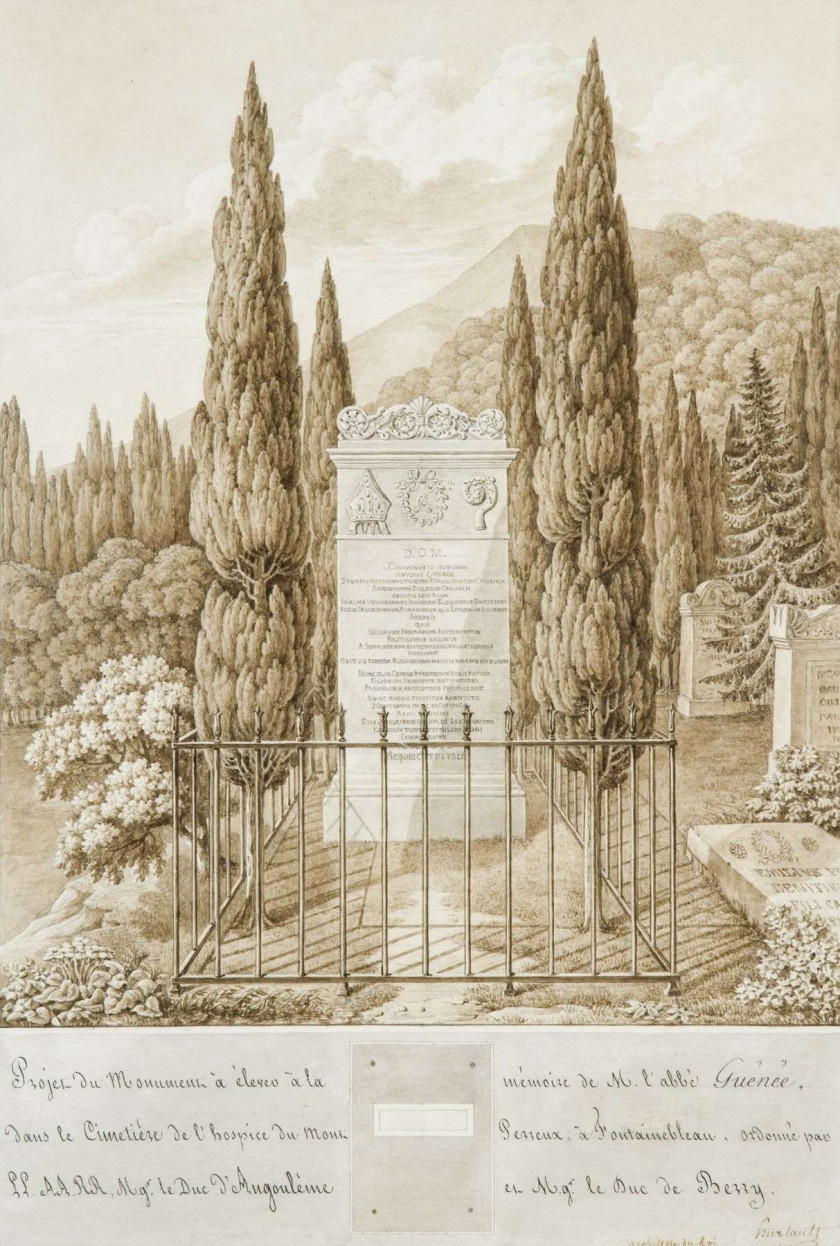
Monument to the Abbé Guénée

Maximilien Joseph Hurtault (8 June 1765 in Huningue – 2 May 1824 in Paris) was a French architect.

== Biography ==
His earliest work was with the Director of fortifications in Huningue. After his arrival in Paris, he became a student of Richard Mique, and was employed by him for work at the Petit Trianon.

Under the Directorate, he served as a professor at the École Polytechnique. Later, he became an architectural inspector for the Conseil des Anciens, and the Conseil des Cinq-Cents at the Palais Bourbon. He also participated in the restoration of the Palais des Tuileries; notably, the decorations for the chapel and the theatre, under the direction of Charles Percier and Pierre-François-Léonard Fontaine.

After obtaining a grand prize for architecture, he spent almost two years in Italy. Upon returning, he was appointed an official architect at the Château de Fontainebleau, where he performed several restorations; notably on the pavilion at the pond, and the long hallway known as the Galerie de Diane. He also designed the "English Garden".

He was a member of the jury at the École Nationale Supérieure des Beaux-Arts, and was entrusted with the general inspection of civic buildings. In 1819, he was admitted to the Institut de France, and took Seat #1 for architecture, succeeding Jacques Gondouin. The following year, he became Director of Works for Saint-Cloud. Shortly after, Louis XVIII commissioned him to create a garden there, for Louise d'Artois and her newborn brother, Henri, duc de Bordeaux. After his death, the project was completed by Eugène Dubreuil (1782-1862).

He was interred in the 11th Division at the Cimetière du Père-Lachaise.
