= Pierre-Édouard =

Pierre-Édouard is a French compound given name, composed of Pierre and Édouard. Notable people with the name include:

- Pierre-Édouard Bellemare (born 1985), French ice hockey right winger
- Pierre-Édouard Lémontey (1762–1826), French lawyer, politician, scholar and historian
- Pierre-Édouard Plucket (1759—1845), French Navy officer and privateer
