= Alain-Charles Perrot =

French architect (born 1945)

Alain Charles Henri "Alain-Charles" Perrot (French pronunciation: [alɛ̃ʃaʁl(ə) pɛʁo]; born 17 September 1945) is a French architect who presided over the Académie des Beaux-Arts in 2021–2022.

== Honours ==
He was made a Knight of the Legion of Honour on 11 April 2001. He was made a Commander of the Ordre des Arts et des Lettres on 16 January 2014.
