= Académie des Beaux-Arts =

French learned society based in Paris

Coordinates: 48°51′26″N 2°20′13″E

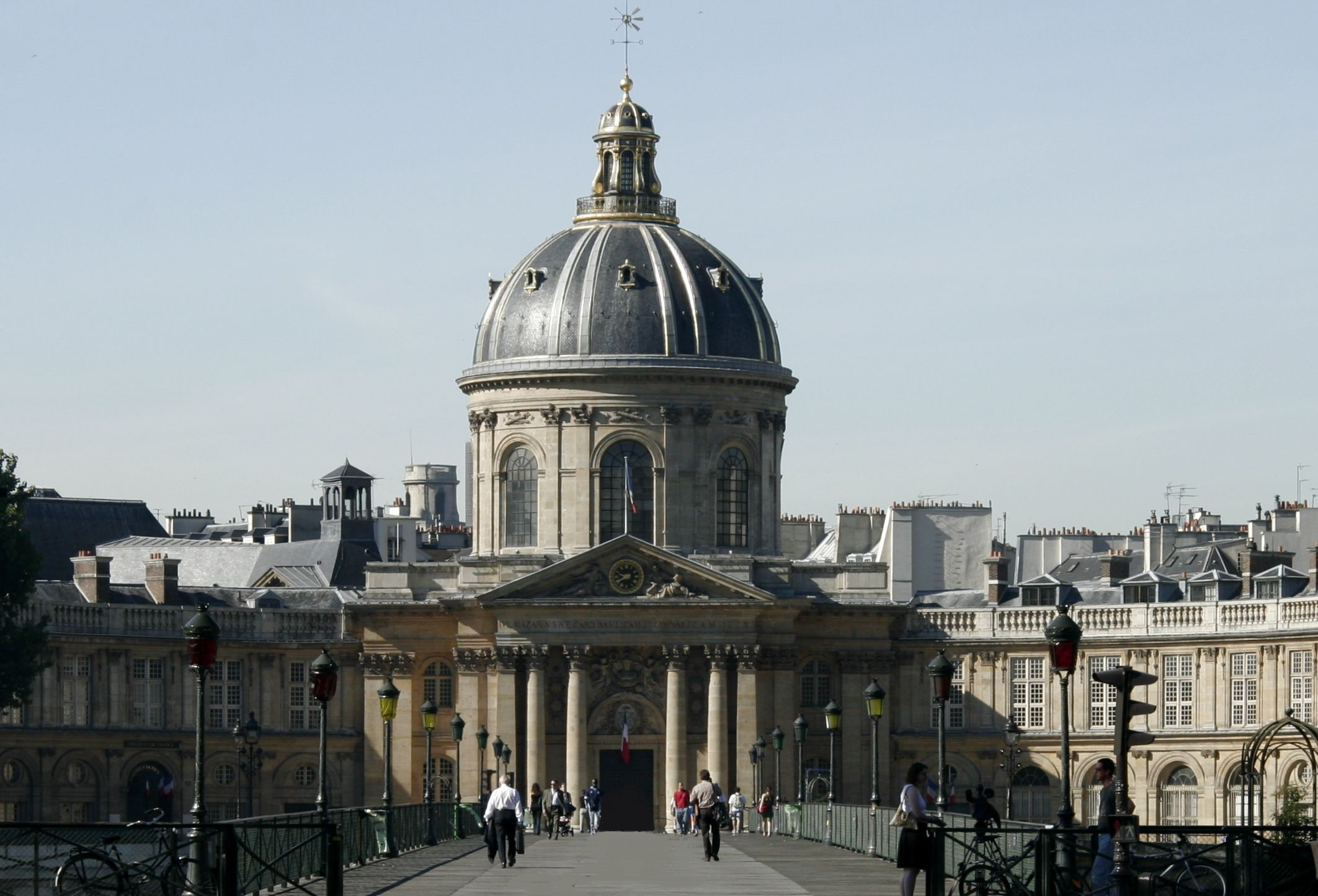
The Institut de France; seat of the Académie des Beaux-Arts

The Académie des Beaux-Arts (French pronunciation: [akademi de boz‿aʁ]; lit. 'Academy of Fine Arts') is a French learned society based in Paris. It is one of the five academies of the Institut de France. As of 2025, the president of the academy is Coline Serreau, a French actress and film director.

== Background ==
The academy was created in 1816 in Paris as a merger of the Académie de peinture et de sculpture (Academy of Painting and Sculpture, founded 1648), the Académie de musique (Academy of Music, founded in 1669) and the Académie d'architecture (Academy of Architecture, founded in 1671).

== Awards ==
Currently, the Académie des Beaux-Arts provides several awards including five dedicated prizes:

- Liliane Bettencourt Prize for Choral Singing
- Simone and Cino Del Duca Foundation Prize for Music
- Pierre Cardin Prize for Design
- François-Victor Noury Prize
- Fondation Pierre Gianadda Prize

Previously the Académie granted the Prix Rossini for excellence in libretto or music composition.

=== Presidents ===
- 1995: Serge Nigg
- 1996: Arnaud d'Hauterives
- 1997: Jean Cardot
- 1998: Christian Langlois
- 1999: Jean-Marie Granier
- 2000: Marius Constant
- 2001: Pierre Schoendoerffer
- 2002: Pierre Carron
- 2003: Gérard Lanvin
- 2004: Roger Taillibert
- 2005: Jean Prodromidès
- 2006: François-Bernard Michel
- 2007: Pierre Schoendoerffer (2nd term)
- 2008: Yves Millecamps
- 2009: Antoine Poncet
- 2010: Roger Taillibert (2nd term)
- 2011: Laurent Petitgirard
- 2012: François-Bernard Michel (2nd term)
- 2013: Lucien Clergue
- 2014: Claude Abeille
- 2015: Aymeric Zublena
- 2016: Érik Desmazières
- 2017: Édith Canat de Chizy
- 2018: Patrick de Carolis
- 2019: Pierre Carron (2nd term)
- 2020: Jean Anguera
- 2021: Alain-Charles Perrot
- 2022: Astrid de La Forest
- 2023: Michaël Levinas
- 2024: Adrien Goetz
- 2025: Coline Serreau

== Members ==
Constituted around the notion of multidisciplinarity, the Académie des Beaux-Arts brings together sixty-three members within nine artistic sections, sixteen foreign associate members and sixty-three corresponding members.

The members are grouped into nine sections:

- Section I: Painting
- Section II: Sculpture
- Section III: Architecture
- Section IV: Engraving
- Section V: Musical composition
- Section VI: Unattached (Free) members
- Section VII: Artistic creation in the cinema and audio-visual fields (since 1985)
- Section VIII: Photography (since 2005)
- Section IX: Choreography (since 2018)

Current members:

Section	Seat	Member	Date
I : Painting: The number of seats in this section was reduced from 14 to 12 on 23 August 1967.; As a consequence, the #3 and #14 seats were eliminated.; Their number was further decreased from 12 to 11 on 16 June 1987.; The #12 seat was transferred to section VII.; The #1 seat was transferred to section VII in 1998, and their number was decreased from 11 to 10.; As of 2026 there are nine members.; For a list of previous members, see: "List of Académie des Beaux-Arts members: Painting".
I : Painting: The number of seats in this section was reduced from 14 to 12 on 23 August 1967.; As a consequence, the #3 and #14 seats were eliminated.; Their number was further decreased from 12 to 11 on 16 June 1987.; The #12 seat was transferred to section VII.; The #1 seat was transferred to section VII in 1998, and their number was decreased from 11 to 10.; As of 2026 there are nine members.; For a list of previous members, see: "List of Académie des Beaux-Arts members: Painting".	2	vacant	
I : Painting: The number of seats in this section was reduced from 14 to 12 on 23 August 1967.; As a consequence, the #3 and #14 seats were eliminated.; Their number was further decreased from 12 to 11 on 16 June 1987.; The #12 seat was transferred to section VII.; The #1 seat was transferred to section VII in 1998, and their number was decreased from 11 to 10.; As of 2026 there are nine members.; For a list of previous members, see: "List of Académie des Beaux-Arts members: Painting".	4	Hervé Di Rosa	2022
I : Painting: The number of seats in this section was reduced from 14 to 12 on 23 August 1967.; As a consequence, the #3 and #14 seats were eliminated.; Their number was further decreased from 12 to 11 on 16 June 1987.; The #12 seat was transferred to section VII.; The #1 seat was transferred to section VII in 1998, and their number was decreased from 11 to 10.; As of 2026 there are nine members.; For a list of previous members, see: "List of Académie des Beaux-Arts members: Painting".	5	Phillipe Garel	2015
I : Painting: The number of seats in this section was reduced from 14 to 12 on 23 August 1967.; As a consequence, the #3 and #14 seats were eliminated.; Their number was further decreased from 12 to 11 on 16 June 1987.; The #12 seat was transferred to section VII.; The #1 seat was transferred to section VII in 1998, and their number was decreased from 11 to 10.; As of 2026 there are nine members.; For a list of previous members, see: "List of Académie des Beaux-Arts members: Painting".	6	Gérard Garouste	2017
I : Painting: The number of seats in this section was reduced from 14 to 12 on 23 August 1967.; As a consequence, the #3 and #14 seats were eliminated.; Their number was further decreased from 12 to 11 on 16 June 1987.; The #12 seat was transferred to section VII.; The #1 seat was transferred to section VII in 1998, and their number was decreased from 11 to 10.; As of 2026 there are nine members.; For a list of previous members, see: "List of Académie des Beaux-Arts members: Painting".	7	Ernest Pignon-Ernest	2021
I : Painting: The number of seats in this section was reduced from 14 to 12 on 23 August 1967.; As a consequence, the #3 and #14 seats were eliminated.; Their number was further decreased from 12 to 11 on 16 June 1987.; The #12 seat was transferred to section VII.; The #1 seat was transferred to section VII in 1998, and their number was decreased from 11 to 10.; As of 2026 there are nine members.; For a list of previous members, see: "List of Académie des Beaux-Arts members: Painting".	8	Tania Mouraud	2024
I : Painting: The number of seats in this section was reduced from 14 to 12 on 23 August 1967.; As a consequence, the #3 and #14 seats were eliminated.; Their number was further decreased from 12 to 11 on 16 June 1987.; The #12 seat was transferred to section VII.; The #1 seat was transferred to section VII in 1998, and their number was decreased from 11 to 10.; As of 2026 there are nine members.; For a list of previous members, see: "List of Académie des Beaux-Arts members: Painting".	9	Fabrice Hyber	2018
I : Painting: The number of seats in this section was reduced from 14 to 12 on 23 August 1967.; As a consequence, the #3 and #14 seats were eliminated.; Their number was further decreased from 12 to 11 on 16 June 1987.; The #12 seat was transferred to section VII.; The #1 seat was transferred to section VII in 1998, and their number was decreased from 11 to 10.; As of 2026 there are nine members.; For a list of previous members, see: "List of Académie des Beaux-Arts members: Painting".	10	Jean-Marc Bustamante	2016
I : Painting: The number of seats in this section was reduced from 14 to 12 on 23 August 1967.; As a consequence, the #3 and #14 seats were eliminated.; Their number was further decreased from 12 to 11 on 16 June 1987.; The #12 seat was transferred to section VII.; The #1 seat was transferred to section VII in 1998, and their number was decreased from 11 to 10.; As of 2026 there are nine members.; For a list of previous members, see: "List of Académie des Beaux-Arts members: Painting".	11	Nina Childress	2025
I : Painting: The number of seats in this section was reduced from 14 to 12 on 23 August 1967.; As a consequence, the #3 and #14 seats were eliminated.; Their number was further decreased from 12 to 11 on 16 June 1987.; The #12 seat was transferred to section VII.; The #1 seat was transferred to section VII in 1998, and their number was decreased from 11 to 10.; As of 2026 there are nine members.; For a list of previous members, see: "List of Académie des Beaux-Arts members: Painting".	13	Yves Millecamps	2001
II : Sculpture: Seat #4 was transferred to section VII in 1988.; For a list of previous members, see: "List of Académie des Beaux-Arts members: Sculpture"	1	Vacant	2020
II : Sculpture: Seat #4 was transferred to section VII in 1988.; For a list of previous members, see: "List of Académie des Beaux-Arts members: Sculpture"	2	Claude Abeille	1992
II : Sculpture: Seat #4 was transferred to section VII in 1988.; For a list of previous members, see: "List of Académie des Beaux-Arts members: Sculpture"	3	Jean Anguera	2013
II : Sculpture: Seat #4 was transferred to section VII in 1988.; For a list of previous members, see: "List of Académie des Beaux-Arts members: Sculpture"	5	Jean-Michel Othoniel	2018
II : Sculpture: Seat #4 was transferred to section VII in 1988.; For a list of previous members, see: "List of Académie des Beaux-Arts members: Sculpture"	6	Anne Poirier	2021
II : Sculpture: Seat #4 was transferred to section VII in 1988.; For a list of previous members, see: "List of Académie des Beaux-Arts members: Sculpture"	7	Pierre-Édouard	2008
II : Sculpture: Seat #4 was transferred to section VII in 1988.; For a list of previous members, see: "List of Académie des Beaux-Arts members: Sculpture"	8	Antoine Poncet	1993
II : Sculpture: Seat #4 was transferred to section VII in 1988.; For a list of previous members, see: "List of Académie des Beaux-Arts members: Sculpture"	9	Brigitte Terziev	2007
III : Architecture: Seat #8 was transferred to section VII in 1985.; For a list of previous members, see: "List of Académie des Beaux-Arts members: Architecture"	1	Jacques Rougerie	2008
III : Architecture: Seat #8 was transferred to section VII in 1985.; For a list of previous members, see: "List of Académie des Beaux-Arts members: Architecture"	2	Jean-Michel Wilmotte	2015
III : Architecture: Seat #8 was transferred to section VII in 1985.; For a list of previous members, see: "List of Académie des Beaux-Arts members: Architecture"	3	Aymeric Zublena	2008
III : Architecture: Seat #8 was transferred to section VII in 1985.; For a list of previous members, see: "List of Académie des Beaux-Arts members: Architecture"	4	Anne Démians	2021
III : Architecture: Seat #8 was transferred to section VII in 1985.; For a list of previous members, see: "List of Académie des Beaux-Arts members: Architecture"	5	Marc Barani	2018
III : Architecture: Seat #8 was transferred to section VII in 1985.; For a list of previous members, see: "List of Académie des Beaux-Arts members: Architecture"	6	Dominique Perrault	2015
III : Architecture: Seat #8 was transferred to section VII in 1985.; For a list of previous members, see: "List of Académie des Beaux-Arts members: Architecture"	7	Alain Charles Perrot	2013
III : Architecture: Seat #8 was transferred to section VII in 1985.; For a list of previous members, see: "List of Académie des Beaux-Arts members: Architecture"	9	Pierre-Antoine Gatier	2019
III : Architecture: Seat #8 was transferred to section VII in 1985.; For a list of previous members, see: "List of Académie des Beaux-Arts members: Architecture"	10	Bernard Desmoulin	2018
IV : Engraving For a list of previous members, see: "List of Académie des Beaux-Arts members: Engraving"	1	Érik Desmazières	2008
IV : Engraving For a list of previous members, see: "List of Académie des Beaux-Arts members: Engraving"	2	Emmanuel Guibert	2023
IV : Engraving For a list of previous members, see: "List of Académie des Beaux-Arts members: Engraving"	3	Astrid de La Forest	2016
IV : Engraving For a list of previous members, see: "List of Académie des Beaux-Arts members: Engraving"	4	Pierre Colllin	2018
IV : Engraving For a list of previous members, see: "List of Académie des Beaux-Arts members: Engraving"	5	Catherine Meurisse	2020
IV : Engraving For a list of previous members, see: "List of Académie des Beaux-Arts members: Engraving"	6	Françoise Pétrovitch	2025
V : Musical composition For a list of previous members, see: "List of Académie des Beaux-Arts members: Music"	1	Laurent Petitgirard	2000
V : Musical composition For a list of previous members, see: "List of Académie des Beaux-Arts members: Music"	2	Bruno Mantovani	2017
V : Musical composition For a list of previous members, see: "List of Académie des Beaux-Arts members: Music"	3	Michaël Levinas	2009
V : Musical composition For a list of previous members, see: "List of Académie des Beaux-Arts members: Music"	4	Gilbert Amy	2013
V : Musical composition For a list of previous members, see: "List of Académie des Beaux-Arts members: Music"	5	François-Bernard Mâche	2002
V : Musical composition For a list of previous members, see: "List of Académie des Beaux-Arts members: Music"	6	Édith Canat de Chizy	2005
V : Musical composition For a list of previous members, see: "List of Académie des Beaux-Arts members: Music"	7	Régis Campo	2017
V : Musical composition For a list of previous members, see: "List of Académie des Beaux-Arts members: Music"	8	Thierry Escaich	2013
VI : Unattached members: Seat #9 was transferred to section VII in 1985.; Seats #2 and #12 were eliminated.; For a list of previous members, see: "List of Académie des Beaux-Arts members: Unattached"	1	William Christie	2008
VI : Unattached members: Seat #9 was transferred to section VII in 1985.; Seats #2 and #12 were eliminated.; For a list of previous members, see: "List of Académie des Beaux-Arts members: Unattached"	3	Vacant	2024
VI : Unattached members: Seat #9 was transferred to section VII in 1985.; Seats #2 and #12 were eliminated.; For a list of previous members, see: "List of Académie des Beaux-Arts members: Unattached"	4	Muriel Mayette-Holtz	2017
VI : Unattached members: Seat #9 was transferred to section VII in 1985.; Seats #2 and #12 were eliminated.; For a list of previous members, see: "List of Académie des Beaux-Arts members: Unattached"	5	Guy Savoy	2026
VI : Unattached members: Seat #9 was transferred to section VII in 1985.; Seats #2 and #12 were eliminated.; For a list of previous members, see: "List of Académie des Beaux-Arts members: Unattached"	6	Marc Ladreit de Lacharrière	2005
VI : Unattached members: Seat #9 was transferred to section VII in 1985.; Seats #2 and #12 were eliminated.; For a list of previous members, see: "List of Académie des Beaux-Arts members: Unattached"	7	Adrien Goetz	2017
VI : Unattached members: Seat #9 was transferred to section VII in 1985.; Seats #2 and #12 were eliminated.; For a list of previous members, see: "List of Académie des Beaux-Arts members: Unattached"	8	Vacant	2021
VI : Unattached members: Seat #9 was transferred to section VII in 1985.; Seats #2 and #12 were eliminated.; For a list of previous members, see: "List of Académie des Beaux-Arts members: Unattached"	10	Henri Loyrette	1997
VI : Unattached members: Seat #9 was transferred to section VII in 1985.; Seats #2 and #12 were eliminated.; For a list of previous members, see: "List of Académie des Beaux-Arts members: Unattached"	11	Patrick de Carolis	2010
VI : Unattached members: Seat #9 was transferred to section VII in 1985.; Seats #2 and #12 were eliminated.; For a list of previous members, see: "List of Académie des Beaux-Arts members: Unattached"	13	François-Bernard Michel	2000
VII : Artistic creation in the cinema and audio-visual fields: Seat #1 was transferred to section V in 1998.; For a list of previous members, see: "List of Académie des Beaux-Arts members: Cinema"	2	Roman Polanski	1998
VII : Artistic creation in the cinema and audio-visual fields: Seat #1 was transferred to section V in 1998.; For a list of previous members, see: "List of Académie des Beaux-Arts members: Cinema"	3	Jean-Jacques Annaud	2007
VII : Artistic creation in the cinema and audio-visual fields: Seat #1 was transferred to section V in 1998.; For a list of previous members, see: "List of Académie des Beaux-Arts members: Cinema"	4	Coline Serreau	2018
VII : Artistic creation in the cinema and audio-visual fields: Seat #1 was transferred to section V in 1998.; For a list of previous members, see: "List of Académie des Beaux-Arts members: Cinema"	5	Vacant	2022
VII : Artistic creation in the cinema and audio-visual fields: Seat #1 was transferred to section V in 1998.; For a list of previous members, see: "List of Académie des Beaux-Arts members: Cinema"	6	Régis Wargnier	2007
VII : Artistic creation in the cinema and audio-visual fields: Seat #1 was transferred to section V in 1998.; For a list of previous members, see: "List of Académie des Beaux-Arts members: Cinema"	7	Vacant	2024
VIII : Photography: Seat #1 was previously occupied by Lucien Clergue (1934-2014); Seats #3 and #4 were established in 2016	1	Vacant	2025
VIII : Photography: Seat #1 was previously occupied by Lucien Clergue (1934-2014); Seats #3 and #4 were established in 2016	2	Yann Arthus-Bertrand	2006
VIII : Photography: Seat #1 was previously occupied by Lucien Clergue (1934-2014); Seats #3 and #4 were established in 2016	3	Dominique Issermann	2021
VIII : Photography: Seat #1 was previously occupied by Lucien Clergue (1934-2014); Seats #3 and #4 were established in 2016	4	Jean Gaumy	2016
IX : Choreography	1	Thierry Malandain	2019
IX : Choreography	2	Blanca Li	2019
IX : Choreography	3	Angelin Preljocaj	2019
IX : Choreography	4	Carolyn Carlson	2020
Foreign associate members	1	Antonio López García	2012
Foreign associate members	2	Vacant	2016
Foreign associate members	3	Moza bint Nasser	2007
Foreign associate members	4	Vacant	2025
Foreign associate members	5	Annie Leibovitz	2022
Foreign associate members	6	Giuseppe Penone	2022
Foreign associate members	7	Vacant	2023
Foreign associate members	8	Vacant	2025
Foreign associate members	9	Vacant	2019
Foreign associate members	10	Woody Allen	2004
Foreign associate members	11	Norman Foster	2007
Foreign associate members	12	Jiří Kylián	2018
Foreign associate members	13	William Kentridge	2021
Foreign associate members	14	Vacant	2024
Foreign associate members	15	Farah Pahlavi	1974
Foreign associate members	16	Philippe de Montebello	2012

== See also ==
- Academic art – Style of painting and sculpture
- A Clinical Lesson at the Salpêtrière – 1887 group tableau portrait by André Brouillet
- Beaux-Arts architecture – Neoclassical architectural style
- École des Beaux-Arts – Influential art schools in France
- French art salons and academies
