= Charles-Blanc Prize =

Defunct annual history and sociology award of the Académie Française

- (French: Prix Charles Blanc)
- Awarded for: Author(s) of works in the fields of History or Sociology
- First award: 1898
- Final award: 1994
- Website: www.academie-francaise.fr/prix-charles-blanc

The Charles-Blanc Prize (French: Prix Charles Blanc) was an annual award of the Académie Française for the author(s) of works in the fields of History and Sociology. The prize was awarded from 1898 to 1994, and was named after French art critic and historian, Charles Blanc.

== Recipients ==
Year	Author	Work	Class
1994	Noël Alexandre		Silver
1994	Alain Landurant	Symbols of medieval manuscripts	Bronze
1994	Nicole Wild	19th century sets and costumes	Bronze
1993	Daniel Arasse	Le Détail, Pour une histoire rapprochée de la peinture	Silver
1992	Jean-Louis Ferrier	L’Aventure de l’art au XIXe siècle	Silver
1992	Sophie Monneret	L’Aventure de l’art au XIXe siècle	Silver
1991	Bernard Bro	La Beauté sauvera le monde	Silver
1989	René-Jean Clot	La Peinture aux abois	Silver
1989	Jacques Thuillier	Nicolas Poussin	Silver
1988	Jean-Claude Daufresne	Louvre et Tuileries	Silver
1987	Michel Martin	Les monuments équestres de Louis XIV. Une grande entreprise de propagande monarchique	Silver
1986	Pascal Bonafoux	Rembrandt, autoportrait	8,000 Francs
1985	Pierre Daix	L’Ordre et l’Aventure. Peinture, modernité et répression totalitaire	4,000 Francs
1984	Francis Toulouse	Le jugement de Cambyse	Silver
1983	Jean Desvoisins	L’univers de Toulouse-Lautrec	3,000 Francs
1983	Viviane Forrester	Van Gogh ou l’enterrement dans les blés	3,000 Francs
1983	Jean Le Pichon	Le mystère du Couronnement de la Vierge	2,500 Francs
1983	Geneviève Noufflard	André Noufflard, Berthe Noufflard, leur vie, leur peinture	
1983	Saint-Jean Bourdin	Analyses des très riches heures du duc de Berry	3,000 Francs
1982	Denise Basdevant	Portrait du sculpteur-peintre Antoine Bourdelle au théâtre des Champs-Élysées	Silver
1982	François Chamoux	La civilisation hellénistique	5,000 Francs
1982	Marcel Giry	Le Fauvisme, ses origines, son évolution	Silver
1982	Hélène Renard	Le Rêve et les Naïfs	3,000 Francs
1982	Maurice Sérullaz	Delacroix	5,000 Francs
1981	Philippe Beaussant	François Couperin	4,000 Francs
1981	Gilbert Rouget	La Musique et la Transe	4,000 Francs
1980	Danielle Elisseeff	La civilisation de la Chine classique	5,000 Francs
1979	Sophie Monneret	L’impressionnisme et son époque	3,000 Francs
1978	Jean-Pierre Jouffroy	Le Jardin des délices, de Jérôme Bosch	3,000 Francs
1978	Pierre Mazars	À l’écoute des peintres	2,000 Francs
1977	Roloff Beny	La Perse, pont de Turquoise	
1977	Seyyed Hossein Nasr	La Perse, pont de Turquoise	
1976	Paul Ardouin	Essai d’une psychanalyse de la lumière	500 Francs
1976	Pierre Miquel	Le paysage français au XIXe siècle	5,000 Francs
1975	Hélène Besnard-Giraudias	Les Sibylles de Sienne	3,000 Francs
1975	Danielle Elisseeff	La civilisation japonaise	3,000 Francs
1974	Jean Chatelain	Dominique Vivant Denon et le Louvre de Napoléon	2,000 Francs
1973	Roger Bonniot	Gustave Courbet en Saintonge	1,000 Francs
1973	Jean Bouret	L’École de Barbizon	2,000 Francs
1972	Liliane Brion-Guérry	L’année 1913. Les formes esthétiques de l’œuvre d’art à la veille de la première guerre mondiale	1,000 Francs
1971	Marianne Roland-Michel	Anne Valayer-Coster	1,000 Francs
1970	Robert Fernier	Gustave Courbet	500 Francs
1970	Clément Gardet	L’Apocalypse des ducs de Savoie	500 Francs
1969	Jean-Paul Crespelle	La Folle Époque	500 Francs
1966	Maurice-Ivan Sicard	Goya, son temps et ses personnages	300 Francs
1965	Jean-Paul Crespelle	Montmartre vivant	500 Francs
1965	Marcelle Wahl	Création picturale et ordre cérébral	500 Francs
1963	Jean Renoir	Renoir	500 Francs
1962	Henri Perruchot	La vie de Gauguin	250 Francs
1961	Jules Combarieu	Histoire de la Musique	1,000 Francs
1961	René Dumesnil	Histoire de la Musique	1,000 Francs
1961	François de Hérain	Peintres et sculpteurs écrivains d’art	500 Francs
1961	Henri Perruchot	La vie de Manet	1,000 Francs
1961	Robert Rey	Poussin	500 Francs
1960	Madeleine Ochsé	Un art sacré pour notre temps	30,000 Francs
1959	Gabriel Vannereau	Saint-Pélerin d’Auxerre, évêque et martyr, le saint au serpent	20,000 Francs
1958	Victor-Lucien Tapié	Baroque et classicisme	10,000 Francs
1957	Denise Aimé-Azam	Mazeppa: Géricault et son temps	
1956	Charles-Pierre Bru	Esthétique de l’Abstraction	2,000 Francs
1955	Jacqueline Copper-Royer	Un joli métier d'art: La Marqueterie de paille	2,000 Francs
1955	Pierre Merle	L’Homme, le Rythme, la Symétrie	2,000 Francs
1955	Jean Vermaest	Ma vieille rue Saint-Jacques	2,000 Francs
1954	Blanche Vogt	L’Isle-Adam, perle de l’Île-de-France	2,000 Francs
1953	Roger Avermaete	Rembrandt et son temps	2,000 Francs
1951	Hélène Adhémar	Watteau, sa vie, son œuvre	1,200 Francs
1951	Jean de Fontanes	Histoire des métiers d’art	
1950	Fred Bérence	Laurent le Magnifique ou La quête de la perfection	800 Francs
1950	Gisèle d'Assailly	Avec les peintres de la réalité poétique	800 Francs
1949	Thadée Natanson	Peints à leur tour	2,000 Francs
1949	Jacques-Gabriel Prod'homme	Glück	2,000 Francs
1948	Fred Bérence	Michel-Ange ou La volonté de puissance	1,000 Francs
1947	Maurice-Pierre Boyé	La mêlée romantique	1,160 Francs
1946	Paul Vuillaud	La pensée ésotérique de Léonard de Vinci	1,160 Francs
1945	Jean-Bernard Bouvier	Cingria	1,600 Francs
1944	Lucien Rudrauf	Eugène Delacroix	1,900 Francs
1943	Louis Hautecoeur	Littérature et peinture en France du XVIIe au XXe siècle	1,500 Francs
1942	Georges Doyen	L'Architecture rurale et bourgeoise en France	1,000 Francs
1942	Robert Hubrecht	L'Architecture rurale et bourgeoise en France	1,000 Francs
1942	Robert Rey	La Peinture moderne	2,000 Francs
1942	Jeanne Villette	L'Ange dans l'Art d'Occident	2,400 Francs
1941	John Rewald	Cézanne. Sa vie, son œuvre, son amitié pour Zola	2,400 Francs
1940	Georges Méautis	Les chefs-d'œuvre de la peinture grecque	1,200 Francs
1939	Guillaume de Jerphanion	La voix des monuments	600 Francs
1939	Marthe Kolb	Ary Scheffer et son temps	600 Francs
1938	René Clozier	L'architecture, éternel livre d'images	1,000 Francs
1938	Micchel Florisoone	Van Gogh	1,000 Francs
1938	Charles-Joseph Quiévreux	Synthèse de l'Histoire générale des Beaux-Arts	1,000 Francs
1938	Raymond Rey	La sculpture romane languedocienne	1,000 Francs
1937	Judith Cladel	Rodin, sa vie glorieuse et inconnue	1,000 Francs
1937	Louise Clément-Carpeaux	La vérité sur l'œuvre et la vie de J.-B. Carpeaux	1,000 Francs
1937	Jean Girou	L'Itinéraire en Terre d'Aude	1,000 Francs
1937	Gueorgui Kreskentievich Loukomski	L'École de Michel-Ange de Pirro Ligorio	1,000 Francs
1937	Léon Van Vassenhove	Vienne éternelle	1,000 Francs
1936	Daniel Baud-Bovy	Les maîtres de la gravure suisse	1,000 Francs
1936	Félia Litvine	Ma vie et mon art	1,000 Francs
1935	Raymond Bayer	L'esthétique de la grâce	1,000 Francs
1935	Joseph Desaymard	Chabrier d'après ses lettres	500 Francs
1935	Philippe Fauré-Frémier	Sculpture religieuse	500 Francs
1935	Germaine Maillet	Peinture religieuse	500 Francs
1934	Marie-Thérèse Dromart-Mairot	Le fond de la Joconde	500 Francs
1934	François Fosca	Daumier	1,500 Francs
1934	Pierre-Barthélemy Gheusi	Le Blason	2,000 Francs
1933	Gaston Baty	Vie de l'art théâtral	500 Francs
1933	Raymond Christoflour	Fernand Maillaud	500 Francs
1933	Marguerite Coleman	Amboise et Léonard de Vinci à Amboise	1,000 Francs
1933	Robert Lambry	Le dessin chez les petits	500 Francs
1933	Gueorgui Kreskentievich Loukomski	Jules Romain	500 Francs
1933	Urbain Mengin	Les deux Lippi	500 Francs
1933	Claude Sézan	Les poupées anciennes	500 Francs
1932	Pierre Chirol	Rouen	1,000 Francs
1932	Jean Delbée	Le sourd et le muet	500 Francs
1932	Émile-François Julia	Antoine Bourdelle	500 Francs
1932	Daniel Marquis-Sébie	Le message de Bourdelle	500 Francs
1932	Hubert Pierquin	Reflets d'art	500 Francs
1932	Kemeri Sandor	Le visage de Bourdelle	500 Francs
1931	Jean Alazard	L’Orient et la peinture française au XIXe siècle	500 Francs
1931	Marc Delmas	Georges Bizet	500 Francs
1931	Jean Stern	François Joseph Belanger architecte des menus plaisirs	1,000 Francs
1931	Julien Tiersot	La chanson populaire et les écrivains romantiques	1,000 Francs
1931	Fernand Vallon	Au Louvre avec Delacroix	500 Francs
1931	Maurice Vloberg	La madone aux roses	500 Francs
1930	André Chagny	Sites et monuments de la région de Crémieu	1,000 Francs
1930	Jean de Nicolay	Les principes de la peinture d’après les maîtres	1,000 Francs
1929	Pierre Francastel	Girardon	1,000 Francs
1929	Louis Guimbaud	Saint-Non et Fragonard	500 Francs
1929	Edomond Joly	Le poème byzantin à Venise	500 Francs
1929	Louise Lefrançois-Pillion	Les sculpteurs de Reims	500 Francs
1928	Georges Bonnenfant	L’Église Saint-Taurin d’Évreux et sa châsse	1,000 Francs
1928	Jean-Baptiste Daranatz	Curiosités du pays basque	500 Francs
1928	François Gebelin	Les châteaux de la Renaissance	500 Francs
1928	Cécile Jéglot	La vie de la Vierge dans l’Art	1,000 Francs
1928	Félix Raugel	Les grandes orgues des églises de Paris et du département de la Seine	1,000 Francs
1927	Hector Lefuel	François-Honoré-Georges-Jacob Desmalter	500 Francs
1927	André Mabille de Poncheville	Carpeaux	1,000 Francs
1927	Henry Prunières	La vie et l’œuvre de Claudio Monteverdi	1,000 Francs
1927	Louis Réau	L’art français aux États-Unis	500 Francs
1927	Raymond Rey	Les vieilles églises fortifiées du Midi de la France. La cathédrale de Cahors	500 Francs
1926	Émile Poiteau	Adrien Demont et Virginie Demont-Breton	500 Francs
1926	Léon Rosenthal	Manet, aquafortiste et lithographe	1,000 Francs
1926	Achille Segard	Jean Gossard dit Mabuse	1,000 Francs
1925	Jean Alazard	Le portrait florentin de Botticelli à Bronzino	1,000 Francs
1925	André Blum	L’œuvre gravé d’Abraham Bosse. Abraham Bosse et la société française au XVIIe siècle	500 Francs
1925	Jean Cordey	Vaux-le-Vicomte	500 Francs
1925	Amédée Gastoué	Le cantique populaire en France	500 Francs
1925	Gustave Soulier	Les influences orientales dans la peinture toscane	1,000 Francs
1924	Paul Courteault	La place royale de Bordeaux	1,000 Francs
1924	Henri Liebrecht	Histoire du théâtre français à Bruxelles au XVIIe et au XVIIIe siècles	1,000 Francs
1924	Marcel Nicolle	Critique d’art, ancien et moderne	1,000 Francs
1923	Charles Bouvet	Les Couperin	500 Francs
1923	Edmond Joly	L’œillet de Séville	1,000 Francs
1923	Louis Réau	L’art russe, de Pierre le Grand à nos jours	1,000 Francs
1923	Sirieyx de Villers	L’Art antique, en douze promenades au Musée du Louvre	500 Francs
1922	Louis Hourticq	De Poussin à Watteau	1,000 Francs
1921	Henri Boissonnot	Histoire et description de la cathédrale de Tours	500 Francs
1921	Joseph Calmette	François Rude	500 Francs
1921	Louis Gielly	L’âme siennoise	500 Francs
1921	Camille Mauclair	Watteau	500 Francs
1921	Louis Schneider	Claudio Monteverdi	500 Francs
1920	Adolphe Boschot	Une vie romantique : Hector Berlioz	1,400 Francs
1920	Auguste Marguillier	La destruction des monuments sur le front occidental	500 Francs
1920	Raymond Ritter	Le château de Pau	500 Francs
1919	Alfred Bel	Les industries de la céramique à Fès	400 Francs
1919	Maurice Landrieux	La cathédrale de Reims	1,000 Francs
1919	André Pératé	Sienne	1,000 Francs
1918	Robert Dubois-Corneau	Pâris de Montmartel	500 Francs
1918	V. Hardy	La cathédrale de Saint-Pierre de Lisieux	500 Francs
1918	Paul Léon	Les monuments historiques	1,000 Francs
1917	Samuel Rocheblave	Le goût en France. Les Arts et les Lettres	1,000 Francs
1917	Benjamin Vallotton	Les Racines	1,400 Francs
1916	Jean de Foville	Pisanello	800 Francs
1916	Joseph de Marliave	Études musicales	600 Francs
1916	André Girodie	Martin Schongauer et l'art du Haut-Rhin au XVe siècle	400 Francs
1916	Georges-Antoine-François-Ludovic Lavergne de Tressan		600 Francs
1916	Gabriel Leroux	Les origines de l'édifice hypostyle en Grèce, en Orient et chez les Romains	1,000 Francs
1915	Paul Cornu	Ensemble de son œuvre	1,000
1915	Jules Écorcheville		400 Francs
1915	Albéric Magnard		1,000 Francs
1914	Édouard André	Alexandre Lunois	500 Francs
1914	Marie Bengesco	Mélanges sur l’art français	400 Francs
1914	Alexis Forel	Voyage au pays des sculpteurs romans	500 Francs
1914	Louis Gillet	La Peinture, XVIIe et XVIIIe siècles	500 Francs
1913	Louis Hautecœur	Rome et la Renaissance de l’Antiquité à la fin du XVIIIe siècle	500 Francs
1913	Paul-André Lemoisne	Eugène Lami	500 Francs
1913	Louise Pillion	Les sculpteurs français du XIIIe siècle	500 Francs
1913	Edmond Pillon	Watteau et son école	500 Francs
1913	Henri Stein	Augustin Pajou	500 Francs
1912	Auguste Boppe	Les peintres du Bosphore au XVIIIe siècle	500 Francs
1912	Jacques de Biez	Emmanuel Frémiet	500 Francs
1912	Edmond Frisch de Fels	Ange-Jacques-Gabriel	400 Francs
1912	Paul Gout	Le Mont Saint-Michel	500 Francs
1912	Eugène Méhu	Salles en Beaujolais	500 Francs
1911	Daniel Baud-Bovy	En Grèce par monts et par vaux	500 Francs
1911	Frédéric Boissonnas	En Grèce par monts et par vaux	500 Francs
1911	Jean de Foville	Histoire de la peinture classique	500 Francs
1911	Fernand de Girardin	Iconographie de J.-J. Rousseau	400 Francs
1911	Marcel Reymond	Le Bernin	500 Francs
1911	Archille Segard	Giov-Antonio Bazzi detto Sodoma et la fin de l’École de Sienne au XVIe siècle	500 Francs
1910	François-Louis Bruel	Inventaire de la Collection de Vinck	700 Francs
1910	René Jean Baptiste de Savigny de Moncorps	Almanachs illustrés du XVIIIe siècle	700 Francs
1910	Urbain Mengin	Benozzo Gozzoli	1,000 Francs
1909	Gustave Clausse	Les Sforza et les arts en Milanais	900 Francs
1909	Louis Hourticq	La Peinture, des origines au XVIe siècle	500 Francs
1909	Joséphin Péladan	Textes choisis de Léonard de Vinci	500 Francs
1908	Adolphe Boschot	Un romantique sous Louis Philippe : Hector Berlioz (1831-1842)	500 Francs
1908	Jules Combarieu	La musique, ses lois, son évolution	800 Francs
1908	Louis Gillet	Raphaël	500 Francs
1907	Raymond Fournier-Sarlovèze	Les peintres de Stanislas-Auguste II	500 Francs
1907	Cyrille Gabillot	Le peintre des fêtes galantes	500 Francs
1907	Jacques-Gabriel Prod'homme	Les symphonies de Beethoven (1800-1827)	800 Francs
1906	Alphonse Bertrand	Versailles	500 Francs
1906	Louis Bréhier	Les basiliques chrétiennes, les églises romanes, les églises byzantines, les églises gothiques	500 Francs
1906	Paul Gaultier	Le Rire et la Caricature	1,400 Francs
1905	Daniel Baud-Bovy	Peintres genevois	500 Francs
1905	Émile Bertaux	Rome	1,000 Francs
1905	Émile Dacier	Le Musée de la Comédie-Française (1680-1905)	400 Francs
1905	Arthur Hustin	Le Palais du Luxembourg	500 Francs
1904	Gustave Cahen	Eugène Boudin, sa vie et son œuvre	500 Francs
1904	Pierre Gusman	La villa impériale de Tibur	2,000 Francs
1903	Maurice Dreyfous	Dalou, sa vie et son œuvre	500 Francs
1903	Paul Eudel	L’orfèvrerie algérienne et tunisienne	500 Francs
1903	Louis Flandrin	Hippolyte Flandrin	1,000 Francs
1903	Louis Juglar	Le style dans les arts et sa signification historique	500 Francs
1902	Victor Champier	Le Palais Royal d’après des documents inédits (1629-1900)	800 Francs
1902	Louis Dimier	Le Primatice	800 Francs
1902	Henry Lapauze	Les dessins d’Ingres	800 Francs
1902	Gustave-Roger Sandoz	Le Palais Royal d’après des documents inédits (1629-1900)	800 Francs
1900	Pierre Gusman	Pompéi, la ville, les monuments, les arts	2,000 Francs

== See also ==
- Académie Française
- Former prizes awarded by the Académie française
