= Raymond Loucheur =

French composer

Raymond Loucheur (1 January 1899 – 14 September 1979) was a French composer.

== Life ==
Very early, he left the town of Tourcoing where he was born to study at Le Havre with Henri Woollett who had Arthur Honegger among his students. Then, he entered the Conservatoire de Paris and worked with Henri Dallier, Paul Fauchet, Nadia Boulanger for harmony, André Gedalge for counterpoint and fugue, Max d'Ollone and Paul Vidal for musical composition, Vincent d'Indy for conducting. At the same time, Joseph Baggers taught him the practice of timpani.

In 1928, he brilliantly won the 1st Grand Prix de Rome with the cantata Héraklès à Delphes on a libretto by René Puaux and performed on 26 October 1929 by the Concerts Lamoureux where it received an excellent welcome.

Between 1925 and 1940, he taught in schools in the city of Paris. In 1935, he received the Georges Bizet Prize. In 1942, he was principal inspector of music education in the schools of the Seine then became general inspector of public instruction (1946) and director of the Conservatoire de Paris (1956 - 1962).

He received the Grand Prix national de musique in 1934.

Loucheur died in Nogent-sur-Marne at age 80.

== Works ==
=== Ballet ===
- Hop-Frog, tale by Edgar Allan Poe with choreography by Harold Landes (1935-1948; Opéra de Paris, 17 June 1953 from which he extracted two symphonic suites, Paris 30 June 1949).

=== Vocal music ===
- Héraklès à Delphes, cantata (Le Havre, 12 June 1928),
- 3 Duos pour soprano, chœur et orchestre: Nostalgiques, Pour Mnasidica from a poem by Sappho and the Chanson des Ingénieurs from Verlaine's Poèmes saturniens, (1934),
- La Ballade des petites filles qui n'ont pas de poupée for 4 soloists, choir and piano (1936),
- L'apothéose de la Seine pour récitant, mezzo-soprano, choir, ondes Martenot and orchestra (1937; Paris, 7 July 1937 for the Exposition Internationale des Arts et Techniques dans la Vie Moderne in collaboration with Fernand Gregh for the literary part),
- 5 poems by Rainer Maria Rilke for mezzo-soprano and string quartet (1952-1957),
- Mélodies: Qui est gris, la Poule jaune, Complainte de l'organiste de Notre-Dame de Nice, etc.,
- Psaume XXXIX pour chœur et orchestre,

=== Music for orchestra ===
- 3 symphonies: n° 1 (1929-1933; 1st complete performance at Concerts Colonne on 15 December 1936; revised in 1969) – n° 2 (1944; Paris, 15 February 1945), n° 3 (1971; Paris, 17 October 1972),
- En famille, pour orchestre de chambre ou sextuor de clarinettes (1932; orchestration in 1940),
- Défilé inspired by a sports photograph comprising 4 parts: Convocation, les enfants, les jeunes filles et les jeunes gens (1934),
- Pastorale (1939),
- Rapsodie malgache for the fiftieth anniversary of Madagascar's attachment to France in 1895 is divided into four parts: Les musiciens – les Piroguiers – les Sorciers and les Guerriers (1945; Paris, 10 October 1946, Manuel Rosenthal conducting),
- Divertissement (1951),
- Concertino pour trompettes et orchestre ou sextuor de clarinettes (1954; orchestration in 1956)
- Concerto pour violon (1960-1963; Paris, 28 February 1965),
- Concertino pour percussion (1963; Paris, 9 January 1966),
- Cortège Interlude et danse en hommage à Rameau pour instruments à vent, harpe et percussion (1964-1965),
- Concerto pour violoncelle (1967-1968, Radio Luxembourg 11 July 1968),
- Thrène pour orchestre à cordes et flûtes (1971),
- Hommage à Raoul Dufy (1973; Paris, 27 October 1974).
- Evocations pour orchestre d'harmonie (1974; Paris, 7 March 1976).

=== Chamber music ===
- En famille for clarinet sextet, oboe and bassoon (1947),
- 4 Pièces en quintette pour harpe, flûte, violon, alto et violoncelle (1953),
- Concertino pour trompette et sextuor de clarinettes (1954; orchestration in 1956),
- Sonate pour violon seul (1959),
- Dialogues pour flûte et harpe (1965),
- Rencontres pour hautbois et violoncelle (1972),
- Divertissement sur les flûtes pour 10 flûtes (1975),
- Reflets pour quintette de cuivres (1976).
- Portraits pour trio d'anches (hautbois, clarinette et basson)

== Bibliography ==
- Adolphe Boschot: Héraklès à Delphe (L'Écho de Paris, 28 October 1929),
- Florent Schmitt: Héraklès (Le Temps, 2 November 1929 and Les envois de Rome de Monsieur loucheur (Le Temps, 28 December 1936),
- Paul Dambly: Mélodies de Raymond Loucheur (Le Petit Journal, 29 January 1934),
- René Dumesnil: Deuxième symphonie de Raymond Loucheur (Le Monde, 4 and 5 March 1945),
- Alain Pâris: Les Quatre-vingts ans de Raymond Loucheur in Le Courrier musical de France.

== Sources ==
- Baker, Theodore; Slonimsky, Nicolas (1995). Dictionnaire biographique des musiciens; Baker's Biographical Dictionary of Musicians). Bouquins (in French). Paris: Éditions Robert Laffont. ISBN 2-221-06787-8.
- René Dumesnil, Histoire de la musique : tome V la première moitié du XXe.
