= Josette Hébert-Coëffin =

French sculptor (1906–1973)

- Born: Josette Marcelle Laurentine Hébert; 16 December 1906; Rouen, France
- Died: 3 June 1973 (aged 66); Paris, France
- Known for: Sculpture
- Awards: Guggenheim Fellow (1937) and Gold medal at the Exposition Internationale des Arts et Techniques dans la Vie Moderne (Exposition universelle), 1937
- Patrons: Richard Dufour, Robert Wlérick, Charles Despiau, Maurice Gensoli

Josette Hébert-Coëffin (16 December 1906 Rouen – 3 June 1973 Neuilly-sur-Seine) was a French sculptor, medallist and a recipient of a 1937 Guggenheim Fellowship.

== Early life and education ==
Hébert-Coëffin was born on 16 December 1906 in Rouen, France. She studied at the École supérieure d'art et design Le Havre-Rouen under the direction of Victorien Lelong and earned first prize in sculpture and architecture at age 16 in 1922. She was later a student of Robert Wlérick and Charles Despiau in Paris. She later studied under Richard Dufour and worked in Alphonse Guilloux's studio.

== Career ==
In 1927, Hébert-Coëffin exhibited two busts, Beethoven and Resignation, at the Salon des artistes francais. In 1937, she received a Guggenheim Fellowship and created models for the manufacture nationale de Sèvres. She also won gold medals at the 1937 World's Fair and the société d'encouragement pour l'industrie. She was elected to the académie des sciences, belles-lettres et arts de Rouen the following year as the third female member after Colette Yver and Louise Lefrançois-Pillion. In 1939, she showed her work at the Salon des Arts Décoratifs. Between 1938 and 1947, she worked under Maurice Gensoli. Much of her work was destroyed during bombings that devastated the Manufacture nationale de Sèvres in March 1942. At this time, she began developing skills in chamotte (stoneware chamotte), as she found it suitable for depicting goat hair, hornbills, kiwis, and feathers. She drew much of her inspiration from fauna. In 1948, she painted La Biche et son faon for President Vincent Auriol and in 1950 illustrated the book Chats des villes et chants des chats by Yahne Lambray and Renée Herrmann.

Hébert-Coëffin spent time at the Monnaie de Paris learning to become a medallist. Throughout her career, she made nearly 300 medals, including one for René Coty. She was the first woman to be commissioned to create a medal for a head of state since the time of François the 1st She also created a medal for Charles de Gaulle. In 1968, she presented de Gaulle with a medal in honor of the Winter Olympics. The medal was later awarded to the French national team. Jean Cocteau requested her specifically for the creation of his medal after seeing her drawings of cats.

== Personal life ==
Hébert-Coëffin was married to industrialist and aviator Charles Coëffin. She died on 3 June 1973 in Paris and is buried next to her husband in Pont-Audemer's Saint-Germain Cemetery. She is surrounded by a grand-duc, her last unfinished work.

== Selected works ==
=== Sculptures ===
- Jean Tambareau, bust in bronze
- Henri Gadeau de Kerville (1936), bust in bronze - Musée des Beaux-Arts de Rouen, Rouen, France
- Coupe aux Boeufs de Hongrie (1940), bronze
- Virgin and Child, known as Madonna statuette - Sainte-Foy Church, Lacalm, France
- Bas-relief (1947) - Hôtel des Postes, Rouen, France
- The doe and her fawn (1948)
- Our Lady of Prudence (1958), statue, on the side of the route nationale 13 in Pacy-sur-Eure, France.
- Saint Vincent de Paul, bas-relief - Collégiale Notre-Dame d'Écouis, Écouis, France
- Monument to Tristan Bernard - Place Tristan Bernard, Paris, France
- Bust of Tristan Bernard - Comédie-Française. Commissioned by Comédie-Française, donated by Bernard's family, and displayed in the foyer.
- René Tamarelle, bronze medallion - Square René-Tamarelle, Bihorel, France
- William the Conqueror stele - Saint-Valery-sur-Somme, France
- Commemorative plaque of the Mora (1966) bronze plaque - Barfleur, France
- Plaque du Général Giraud (1954) - Barentin (Seine-Maritime), France
- Monument in bronze for Jean Perrin - Jardin des Champs-Élysées, (opposite the Grand Palais), Paris, France
- Bust of Louis Ricard - Court of Appeals, Rouen, France
- Stele and bronze portrait of Charles de Gaulle - Place du Général-de-Gaulle
- Bust of Etienne Louis Malus, plaster - Museum of the École polytechnique

=== Medals ===
- The Pont Saint-Jean (Bordeaux) (1965), bronze. Other version in silver plated bronze.
- French Republic. Ministère du travail. Caisse nationale de prévoyance (1975), bronze
- Sud-Ouest, bronze
- Marie Curie (1867–1934) (1967), bronze - Monnaie de Paris, Paris, France
- 1968 Winter Olympics, Grenoble (1968), bronze
- Joan of Arc (1431–1456) (1971), bronze - Monnaie de Paris, Paris, France
- Philippe Boiry (1927–2014) (1965)
- Dean Denis Leroy (1973) - Rennes, France
- Memorial of the Natzweiler-Struthof concentration camp liberation

=== Paintings ===
- Napoleon III : study for the allegory of France, charcoal drawing - Musée Hébert, Paris, France
- Ophelia with Cornflowers, painting - Musée Hébert, Paris, France

== Exhibitions ==
=== France ===
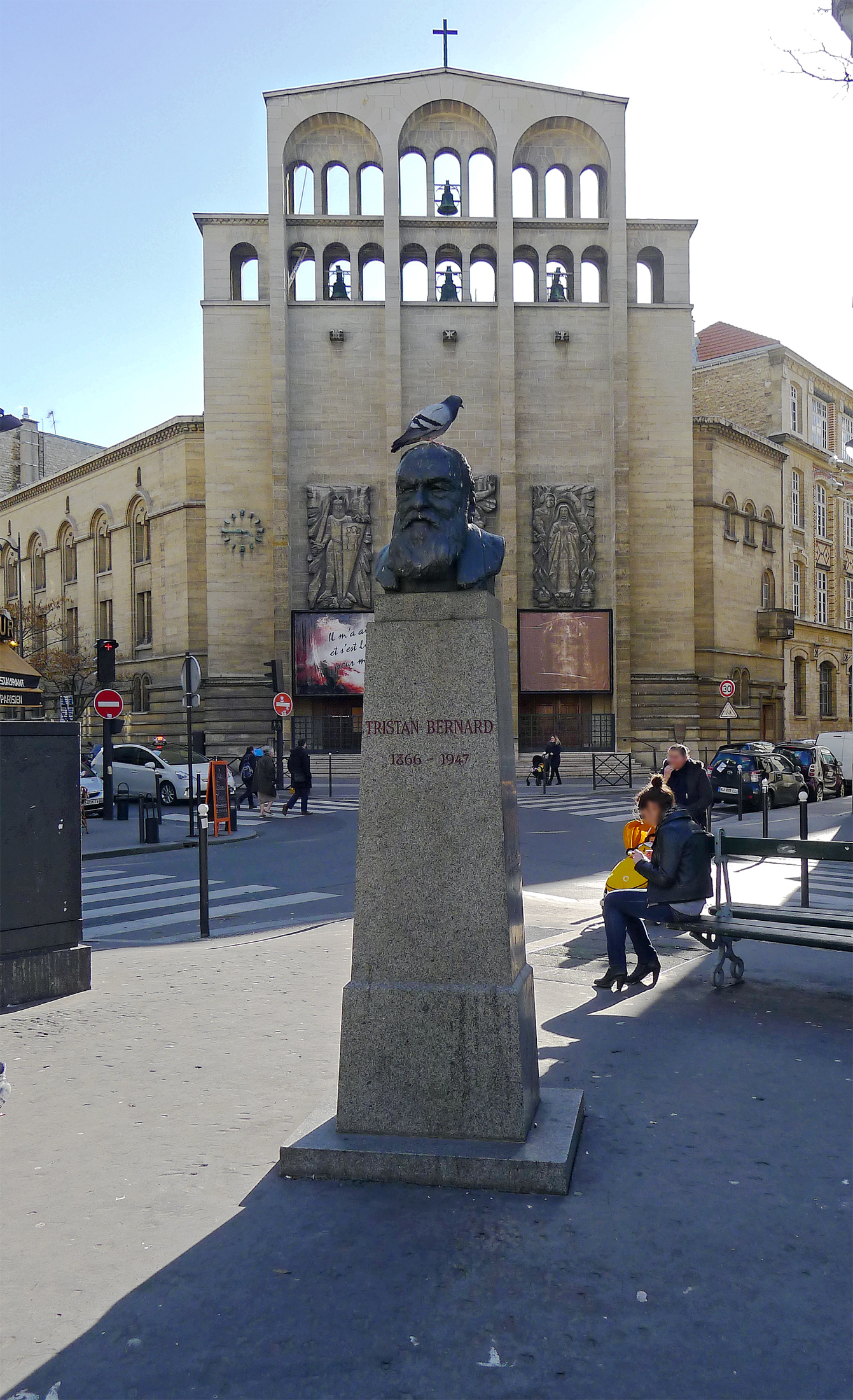
Bust of Tristan-Bernard, place Tristan-Bernard in Paris

- 1927: Salon des artistes français - Beethoven and Resignation, busts
- 1927-1939: Salon des artistes rouennais
- 1931: Salon des artistes français - bronze sculpture of the Société des artistes français
- 1933: Salon d'automne
- 1935: Salon des Indépendants. Acquired by the General Council of the Seine.
- 1936: Salon des Indépendants - sparrow. Stolen during the exhibition.
- 1936: Salon des arts ménagers - Le Toucan
- 1936: Salon d’automne - Oiseaux
- 1936: Exposition des Seize, Rouen - aviation monument, Ministry of Air
- 1938: Galerie L’Équipe - Abstract and Non-Objective Art exhibition
- 1938: Petit Palais - 33rd Group of Artist de ce temps
- 1938-1953: Salon des Tuileries
- 1940: Salon d'automne
- 1962: Musée Carnavalet - Medal of the SS France (1960)
- Unknown date: Château de Rambouillet

=== Austria ===
- 1957: Kunsthistorisches Museum - Modern French Medallists exhibition

=== Brazil ===
- Ambassade de France au Brésil - Vase decorated with ram's head

=== Italy ===
- Villa Médicis

=== United Kingdom ===
- 2006 (post-mortem): British Museum - Médaille des 1968 Winter Olympics Grenoble
- 2019 (post-mortem): The Sladmore Gallery - Sculptures of Les Animaliers 1900–1950

=== United States ===
- 1939: Solomon R. Guggenheim Foundation - Non-Objective Painting Collection. No. 7 and No. 8, oil on paper.
- 1940: Solomon R. Guggenheim Foundation - Ten American Non-Objective Painters
- 1951: National Gallery of Art - Medal Jean Cocteau

== Awards ==
- 1934: Bouctot Prize (fine arts), Académie des sciences, belles-lettres et arts de Rouen
- 1936: Silver Plaquette, 21st annual competition organized by the Société d'encouragement à l'art et à l'industrie
- 1937: Gold medal, Exposition Internationale des Arts et Techniques dans la Vie Moderne
- 1937: Guggenheim Fellowship
- 1938: Membership, Académie des sciences, belles-lettres et arts de Rouen
- Officer of the National Order of the Legion of Honour
- Knight of the National Order of Merit
- Knight of the Ordre des Arts et des Lettres
- Knight of the Order of Cultural Merit (Monaco)
