= Alpuech =

Part of Argences-en-Aubrac in Occitanie, France

- Part of Argences-en-Aubrac
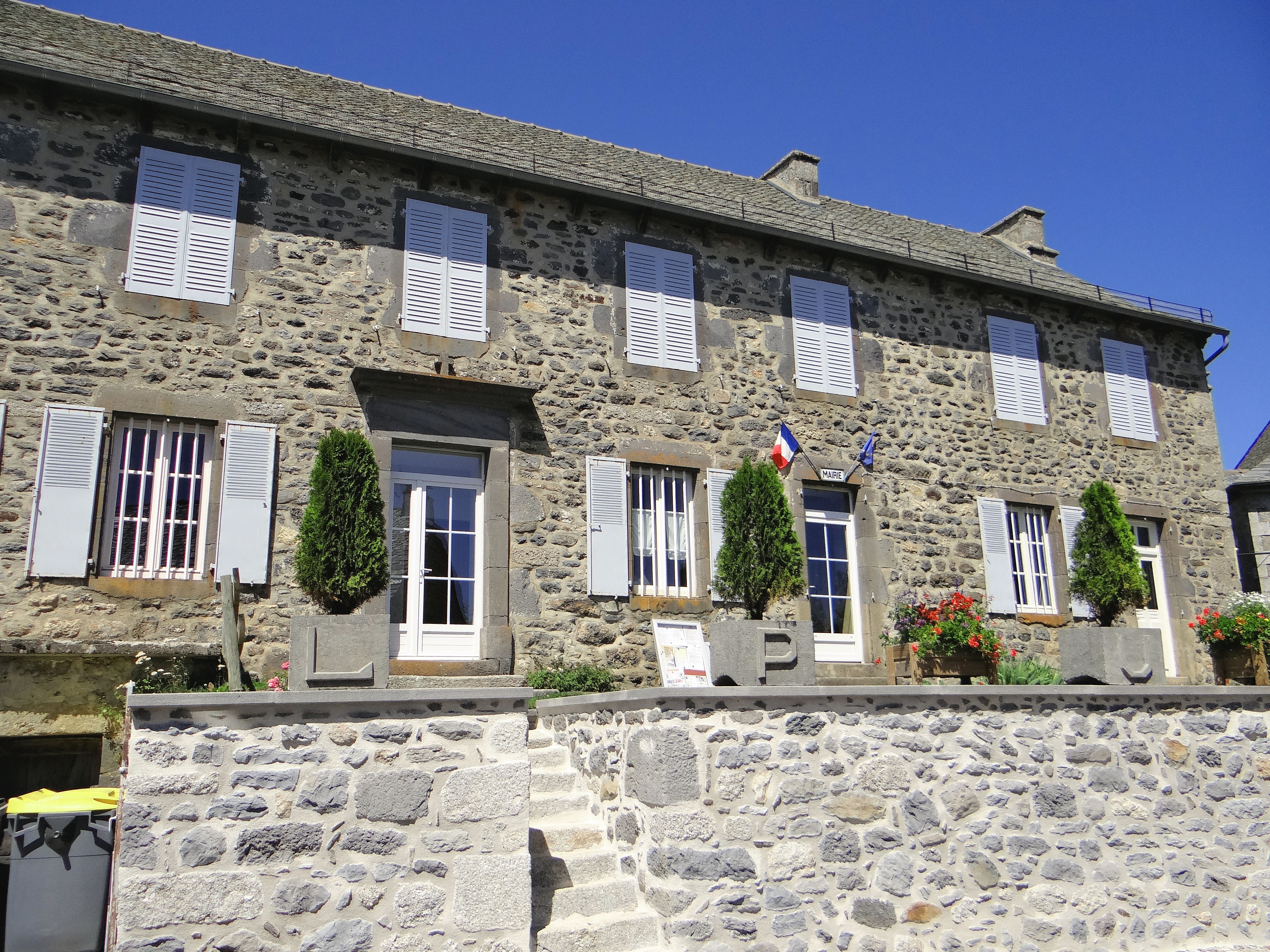
- The town hall in Alpuech
- Location of Alpuech
- Location within France Location within Occitanie
- Coordinates: 44°45′47″N 2°50′57″E
- Country: France
- Region: Occitania
- Department: Aveyron
- Arrondissement: Rodez
- Canton: Aubrac et Carladez
- Commune: Argences-en-Aubrac
- Area^{1}: 14.88 km^{2} (5.75 sq mi)
- Elevation: 1,082 m (3,550 ft)
- Highest elevation: 1,303 m (4,275 ft)
- Lowest elevation: 950 m (3,120 ft)
- Population (2018): 70
  - Density: 4.7/km^{2} (12/sq mi)
- Time zone: UTC+01:00 (CET)
  - Summer (DST): UTC+02:00 (CEST)
- Postal code: 12210
- ^{1} French Land Register data, which excludes lakes, ponds, glaciers > 1 km^{2} (0.386 sq mi or 247 acres) and river estuaries.

Alpuech (Languedocien: Alpuèg) is a former commune in the Aveyron department in the Occitanie region of southern France. On 1 January 2016, it was merged into the new commune of Argences-en-Aubrac.

== Geography ==
This commune lies below the south-central portion of the Massif Central on the plateau of the Viadène to the northwest of the plateau of Aubrac.

The commune is long and narrow oriented from north-west to south-east about 50 km south-west of Saint-Flour and 50 km north-west of Marvejols. Access to the commune is by road D921 which crosses the central waist of the commune from Laguiole in the south-west to Lacalm in the north east. The D34 road starts from this road on the eastern border of the commune and passes through to the north-west, through the village and continues west to La Terrisse. There are a number of country roads in the commune but no other villages or hamlets.

The Argence Vive stream forms the western border of the commune and flows westward to join the river Truyère. Its tributary Argence Morte also rises in the commune and flows north where it forms part of the northern border before continuing westwards to the Argence Vive. Apart from the Ruisseau de Fluols in the south-western border these are the only significant waterways in the commune.

== History ==
Alpuech existed in 976 and from the fourteenth century fairs that took place there were famous in the country.

The Castle of Alpuech as well as that of Cantoin, the Barony of Benaven, and Lacalm castle all belonged to the County of Rodez. This gave the benefit to Alpuech of the monastery of Pebrac (Haute Loire) in 1215. The castle was destroyed in 1550. The oldest houses surround the church which is from the 11th century in the Roman style with a Latin cross. In good weather the bell tower has views over the Cantal Mountains. There are traces of Roman roads and also paths from the 16th century on the road to Vitrac and a remarkable "tau cross" from the 12th century north of the village.

== Administration ==
List of Successive Mayors of Alpuech

Mayors from the French Revolution to 1935

From	To	Name
1793	1803	Gailhac Bouldoires
1804	1806	Bertrand Vigouroux
1806	1811	Pierre Valadier
1812	1841	Gabriel Capoulade
1841	1858	Charles Noël
1858	1876	Edouard Noël
1877	1884	J. François Allie
1884	1888	Edouard Daude
1888	1896	Casimir Brevier
1896	1902	Ferdenand Noël
1902	1908	Edouard Daude
1908	1912	Guillaume Cambournac
1912	1924	Léon Allie
1924	1928	Cayla
1928	1935	Eugène Blancher

Mayors from 1935

From	To	Name
1935	1944	Marius Dangles
1944	1960	Fernand Bouldoires
1960	2008	Jean Balitrand
2008	2015	André Raymond

== Population ==
The inhabitants of the commune are known as Alpuechois or Alpuechoises in French.

Historical population
Year	Pop.	±% p.a.
2006	80	—
2011	72	−2.09%
2018	70	−0.40%
Source: INSEE

== Sites and monuments ==
- The Church of Saint Martin (11th century) is registered as an historical monument

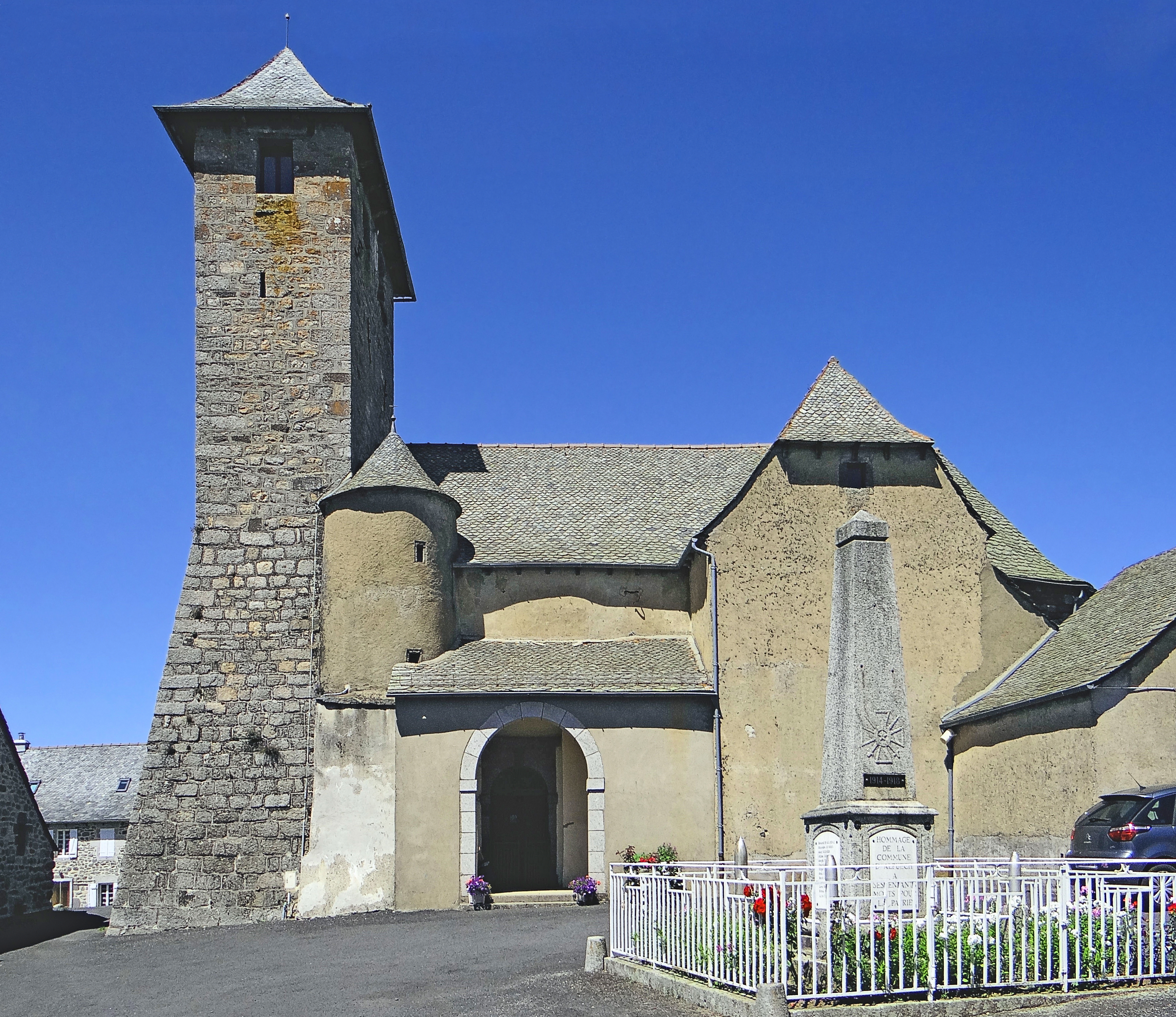
Church of Saint Martin at Alpuech

== Notable people linked to the Commune ==
- J.P. Bouyssou, known as the 'Thief of Alpuech' was an outlaw and Royalist who was a "Robin Hood" of the revolutionary era: he took from the rich to give to the poor.

== See also ==
- Communes of the Aveyron department
