= Nouvelle École (disambiguation) =

Nouvelle École is an annual French-language political and philosophy magazine.

Nouvelle École, a French phrase meaning New School, may also refer to:

- "Nouvelle École", a song by French rapper Booba from the 2002 album Temps mort
- La Nouvelle Ecole de Paris, a postwar group of artists; see Pierre Emile Lelong
- École Nouvelle de la Suisse Romande, a school in Lausanne, Switzerland
