= The Feast in the House of Simon the Pharisee (Champaigne) =

Painting by Philippe de Champaigne

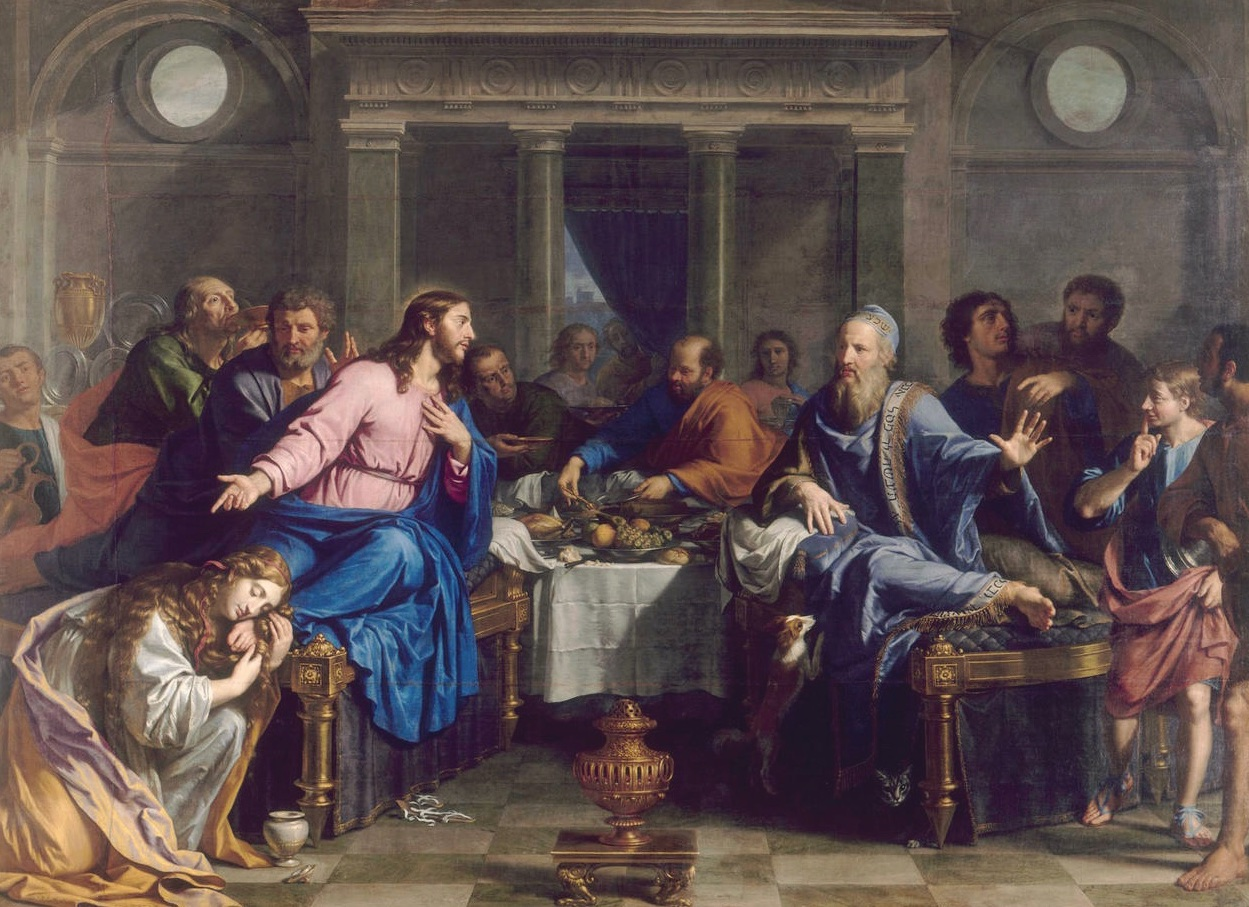
The Feast in the House of Simon the Pharisee (c. 1656) by Philippe de Champaigne

The Feast in the House of Simon the Pharisee is a c.1656 oil on canvas painting by Philippe de Champaigne, now in the Fine Arts Museum of Nantes. It was commissioned around 1656 by Queen Anne of Austria, wife of Louis XIII.

== Bibliography (in French) ==
- Theodor W. Adorno, Théorie esthétique, Klincksieck, 1982
- Giulio Carlo Argan, L'Europe des capitales 1600-1700, Skira, 1978, 215 p.
- François Avril, L’enluminure à l’époque gothique, 1200-1420, Bibliothèque de l’image, Paris, 1995
- Roland Barthes, La chambre Claire, Note sur la photographie, Gallimard, Paris, 1980, col. Cahier du Cinéma
- Bruno Bettelheim, Psychanalyse des contes de fées, Robert Laffont, 1976, 512 p., (collection Pluriel)
- André Breton, Manifestes du surréalisme, Folio, Paris, 1989, col. Essais
- André Chastel, La pala ou le retable italien des origines à 1500, Liana Levi, Paris, 1993
- Hubert Damisch, Théorie du nuage, Le Seuil, 1972, 334 p.
- Gilles Deleuze, Félix Gattari, L'anti-Œdipe, Éditions de Minuit, 1972, 494 p., (collection critique)
- Georges Didi-Huberman, Fra Angelico, dissemblance et figuration, Flammarion, 1990, 259 p.
- Georges Duby, Fondements d’un nouvel humanisme, 1280-1440, Skira, Paris
- Anton Ehrenzweig, L'ordre caché dans l'art, Gallimard, 1967, 366 p., (collection Tel)
- Filibien, Entretiens sur les vies des peintres anciens I et II, Les Belles Lettres, Paris, 1987, textes et notes de René Démoris
- Pierre Francastel, Peinture et société, Denoël, 1977, 362 p., (collection grand format médiation)
- Michael Fried, Esthétique et origines de la peinture moderne, Le réalisme de Courbet, Gallimard, collection Essai, Paris, 1993
- Claude Gintz, Regards sur l’art américain des années soixante, Anthologie critique, Territoires, Paris, 1979
- Nelson Goodman, Langage de l’art, Jacqueline Chambon, Nîmes, 1990
- Paul Guillaume, La psychologie de la forme, Flammarion, 1979, 260 p., (collection Champs Flammarion)
- Vassily Kandinsky, Du spirituel dans l’art, Folio, Paris, 1954, col. Essais
- Robert Klein, La forme et l'intelligible, Gallimard, 1970, 496 p., (col. Tel)
- Jean-François Lyotard, La condition post-moderne Éditions de Minuit, 1979, 109 p., (collection critique)
- Pierre Legendre, Leçon III, Dieu au miroir, Étude sur l’institution des images, Fayard, 1994, Paris
- Émile Male, L’art religieux au 13th century en France, Livre de poche, Paris, 1948, col. Biblio Essais
- Louis Marin, Philippe de Champaigne ou la présence cachée, Hazan, coll. 35/37, 1995
- Catherine Millet, L’art contemporain en France, Flammarion, Paris, 1987,
- Erwin Panovsky, Idea, Gallimard, 1983, 284 p., trad. Henri Joly, (collection idées)
- Marcelin Pleynet, Système de peinture, Le Seuil, 1977, 188 p. (collection Points Anthropologie, Science Humaine)
- Pierre Restany, L'autre face de l'Art, Galilée, 1979, 171 p., (collection écritures/figures)
- Meyer Schapiro, Style, artistes et société, Gallimard, 1982, 443 p., (collection Sciences Humaines)
- Jean Starobinski, 1789 Les emblèmes de la Raison, Champs Flammarion, 1979, 225 p.
- Lionello Venturi, Histoire de la critique d’art, Éditions de la Connaissance, Bruxelles, 1938
- Leonardo da Vinci, Les carnets de Léonard de Vinci, Tomme I et II, Gallimard, Paris, 1942, trad. Louise Servicen, coll. Tel
- Vitruvius, Les dix livres d’architecture de Vitruve, Bibliothèque de l’Image, Paris, 1995, préface d’Antoine Picon
- Heinrich Wolfflin, Renaissance et baroque, Ed. Livre de poche, Paris
