= Pierre Gusman =

French artist and art historian (1862-1941)

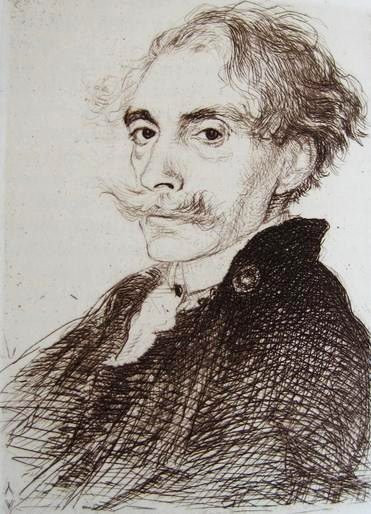
Pierre Gusman in 1924; portrait by Albert Váradi (1896-1925)

Pierre Gustave Adolphe Gusman, born Gusmand (6 December 1862, Paris – 18 December 1941, Grosrouvre) was a French engraver, illustrator, and art historian, specializing in wood engraving techniques and Roman architecture.

== Biography ==
He was born to the engraver, Adolphe Gusman, and his wife, Marie Émilie née Cleftie. He graduated from the École Nationale Supérieure des Beaux-Arts, and held his first exhibition at the Salon in 1885. Various grants allowed to make visits to Italy, between 1894 and 1902. He was awarded the Charles-Blanc Prize in 1900, for his work on Pompeii, and again in 1904, for his work on the Villa Jovis.

Later, he joined the École de Rambouillet, founded in 1905 by a community of artists; including Julien Tinayre and Pierre Emile Lelong In 1911, he was one of the co-founders of the "Société de la gravure sur bois originale" (SGBO), which was dissolved in 1935.

He was the author of numerous essays on the decorative arts of ancient Rome, and contributed regularly to several publications such as Nouvel Imagier and Le Livre et l'estampe. He also served as the Director for the collection "Documents d'art", belonging to the editor, Albert Morancé. From 1922 to 1931, he managed one of Morancés magazines, Byblis, issued quarterly. During this time, in 1925, he was named a Knight in the Legion of Honor.
