= Argences-en-Aubrac =

Commune in Occitanie, France

- Commune
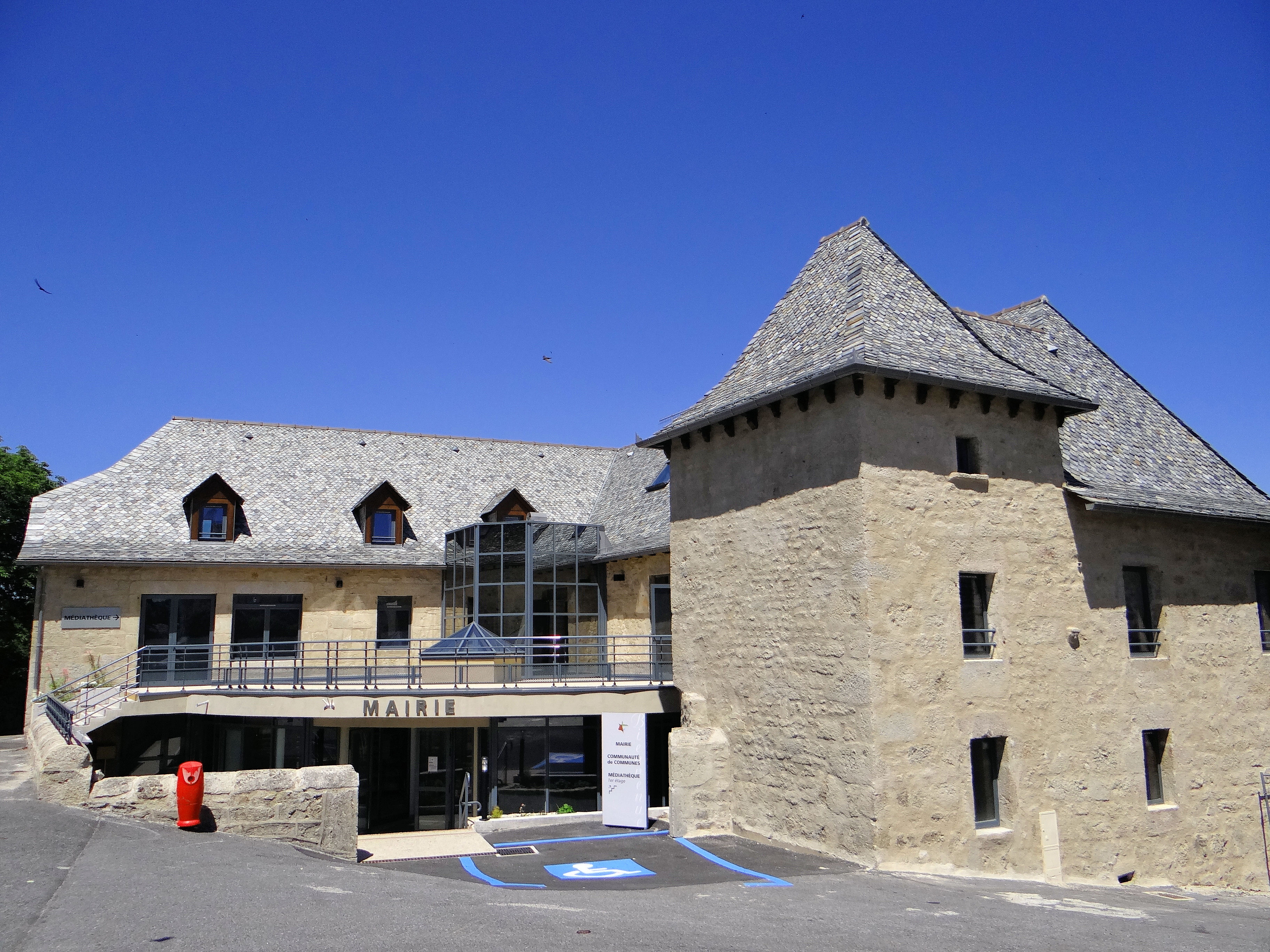
- The town hall in Sainte-Geneviève-sur-Argence
- Location of Argences-en-Aubrac
- Location within France Location within Occitanie
- Coordinates: 44°48′11″N 2°45′32″E
- Country: France
- Region: Occitania
- Department: Aveyron
- Arrondissement: Rodez
- Canton: Aubrac et Carladez
- Intercommunality: Aubrac, Carladez et Viadène

Government
  - Mayor (2020–2026): Jean Valadier
- Area^{1}: 151.78 km^{2} (58.60 sq mi)
- Population (2023): 1,581
  - Density: 10.42/km^{2} (26.98/sq mi)
- Time zone: UTC+01:00 (CET)
  - Summer (DST): UTC+02:00 (CEST)
- INSEE/Postal code: 12223 /12420, 12210
- ^{1} French Land Register data, which excludes lakes, ponds, glaciers > 1 km^{2} (0.386 sq mi or 247 acres) and river estuaries.

Argences-en-Aubrac (French pronunciation: [aʁʒɑ̃s ɑ̃.n‿obʁak], lit. 'Argences in Aubrac'; Occitan: Argenças d'Aubrac) is a commune in the department of Aveyron, southern France. The municipality was established on 1 January 2016 by merger of the former communes of Sainte-Geneviève-sur-Argence, Alpuech, Graissac, Lacalm, La Terrisse and Vitrac-en-Viadène.

== See also ==
- Communes of the Aveyron department
