= Louise Lefrançois-Pillion =

French art historian, university teacher (1871–1959))

- Born: 8 August 1871; Les Andelys, France
- Died: 14 August 1959 (aged 88); Amiens
- Education: École du Louvre
- Occupations: art historian, professor

Louise Lefrançois-Pillion (8 August 1871 in Les Andelys– 14 August 1959 in Amiens) was a French art historian, a specialist in medieval sculpture and professor of art history.

== Early Life and Education ==
She studied art history at the École du Louvre. On 4 November 1904, she defended her thesis titled: La Porte de Calende et les Libraires dans la cathédrale de Rouen (The Calende Portal and the Booksellers at Rouen Cathedral). This research was conducted under the supervision André Michel, and Théophile Homolle.

== Work ==
From shortly before 1910 until 1914, she worked for Jacques Doucet at the Bibliothèque d’art et d’archéologie (Library of Art and Archaeology). There, she compiled the Répertoire d’iconographie chrétienne de l’Occident (Repertory of Western Christian Iconography), a reference work for historians of Western medieval art.

Throughout her professional career, spanning from 1900 to 1959, Louise Lefrançois-Pillion compiled a collection of documents that now bears her name within the Library of Art and Archaeology an institution that later evolved into the library of the Institut national d’histoire de l’art (National Institute for Art History).

This collection comprises a diverse range of materials, including notebooks used to compile an Iconographic Index of Western Christianity, handwritten notes on medieval artworks, annotated documents, travel journals from her 1906 stay in Italy, and sketchbooks. Later in her career, she turned to new pursuits outside her primary field as an art historian.

Handwriting and signature of Louise Lefrançois Pillion

Beginning in 1949, she also engaged in translating works from English into French; most notably, she translated The Romance of Conversion by the Catholic Cardinal John Henry Newman. Louise Lefrançois-Pillion continued to publish works on the history of medieval art until the end of her life. Her final book, titled Églises et cathédrales (Churches and Cathedrals), was published in 1956 three years before her passing.

== Death ==
Louise Le François-Pillion passed away on August 14, 1959, in the city of Amiens at the age of 88, and was buried in Crèvecœur-le-Grand (located in the Oise department).

=== Distinctions ===
- The Charles-Blanc Prize for Les Sculpteurs français du XIIIe siècle in 1913.
- The Charles-Blanc Prize for Les Sculpteurs de Reims in 1929.
- The Montyon Prize for Les Sculptures du XIIe siècle in 1932.
- The Prix Bordin for Les Sculpteurs français du XXe siècle in 1933.
- The Prix Alice-Louis-Barthou in 1944.
- The Prix Amic for Abbayes et Cathédrales in 1957.
- Finally, in 1958, at the age of 87, she was named a *Chevalier* (Knight) of the Legion of Honour, upon the recommendation of the Académie française.

=== Publications ===
- Les sculpteurs de Reims (The Sculptors of Reims), Paris, Rieder, 1928.
- Les sculpteurs français du XIIe siècle (French Sculptors of the 12th Century), Paris, Plon-Nourrit, 1931.
- La cathédrale d'Amiens (Amiens Cathedral), Paris, Plon, 1937.
- Notre-Dame de Paris, Paris, Éditions d'art et d'histoire, Plon, 1942.
- L'art roman en France: architecture, sculpture, peinture, arts mineurs (Romanesque Art in France: Architecture, Sculpture, Painting, Minor Arts), Paris, G. Le Prat, 1945.
- L'esprit de la cathédrale (The Spirit of the Cathedral), Paris, Plon, 1946.
- Maitres d'oeuvre et tailleurs de pierre des cathédrales (Master Builders and Stonemasons of the Cathedrals), Paris, R. Laffont, 1949.
- Les cathédrales de France présentées à la jeunesse française (The Cathedrals of France Presented to the Youth of France), Paris, Amiot-Dumont, 1950.
- L'art du XIVe siècle en France. Suivi d'un chapitre sur le vitrail par Jean Lafond (14th-Century Art in France. Followed by a chapter on stained glass by Jean Lafond), Paris, A. Michel, 1954.
- Abbayes et cathédrales (Abbeys and Cathedrals), Paris, A. Fayard, 1956.
