= Sainte-Geneviève-sur-Argence =

Part of Argences-en-Aubrac in Occitanie, France

- Part of Argences-en-Aubrac
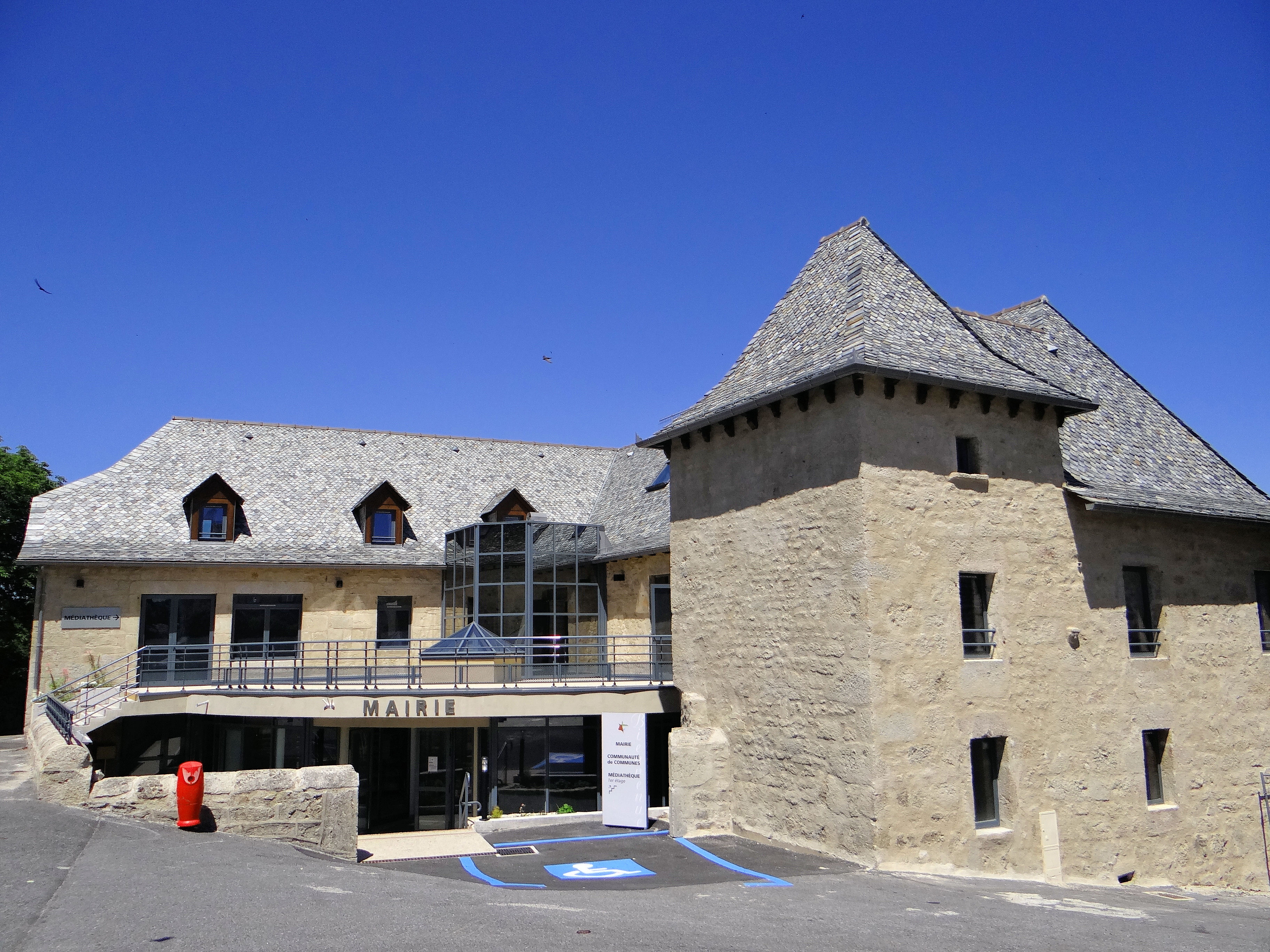
- Town hall

- Coat of arms
- Location of Sainte-Geneviève-sur-Argence
- Location within France Location within Occitanie
- Coordinates: 44°48′10″N 2°45′33″E
- Country: France
- Region: Occitania
- Department: Aveyron
- Arrondissement: Rodez
- Canton: Aubrac et Carladez
- Commune: Argences-en-Aubrac
- Area^{1}: 43.4 km^{2} (16.8 sq mi)
- Elevation: 800 m (2,600 ft)
- Highest elevation: 928 m (3,045 ft)
- Lowest elevation: 316 m (1,037 ft)
- Population (2018): 972
  - Density: 22.4/km^{2} (58.0/sq mi)
- Time zone: UTC+01:00 (CET)
  - Summer (DST): UTC+02:00 (CEST)
- Postal code: 12420
- ^{1} French Land Register data, which excludes lakes, ponds, glaciers > 1 km^{2} (0.386 sq mi or 247 acres) and river estuaries.

Sainte-Geneviève-sur-Argence (French pronunciation: [sɛ̃t ʒənvjɛv syʁ aʁʒɑ̃s]; Languedocien: Sant Jurvèva) is a former commune in the Aveyron department in southern France. On 1 January 2016, it was merged into the new commune of Argences-en-Aubrac.

== Population ==
Historical population
Year	Pop.	±% p.a.
2006	1,020	—
2011	996	−0.48%
2018	972	−0.35%
Source: INSEE

== See also ==
- Communes of the Aveyron department
