= Alfred Bel =

French orientalist (1873–1945)

- Born: May 14, 1873; Salins-les-Bains, Jura, France
- Died: February 18, 1945 (aged 71–72); Meknes, Morocco
- Awards: Charles-Blanc Prize

Letter by Alfred Bel (1919)

Alfred Bel (14 May 1873, Salins-les-Bains – 18 February 1945, Meknes, aged 71) was a French orientalist and scholar of Arab culture. He was the director of the Médersa de Tlemcen from 1905 to 1935.

== Works ==
- Les Benou Ghanya et leur lutte contre l'Empire almohade, Paris, Leroux, 1903.
- Tlemcen et ses environs, guide illustré du touriste, Oran, Fouque, 1908.
- Histoire des Beni 'Abd-el-Wâd, rois de Tlemcen, par Abou Zakariya Yahia Ibn Khaldoun, texte et traduction, 2 vol., Alger, Fontana frères, 1913.
- with Prosper Ricard, Le travail de la laine à Tlemcen, Alger, Jourdan, 1913.
- Un atelier de poterie de de faïences au X^{e} siècle de J.-C. découvert à Tlemcen, Constantine, Braham, 1914.
- Le Maroc pittoresque : Fès, Meknès et Régions, Paris, 1917.
- Les industries de la céramique à Fès, Alger et Paris, Carbonel et Leroux, 1918.
- Catalogue des livres arabes de la bibliothèque de la mosquée d'El Qarawiyin, Fès, Imprimerie municipale, 1918.
- with Mohammed Bencheneb, Takmilat es-sila d'Ibn El 'Abbar, texte arabe, Alger, Fontana, 1920.
- Zahrat el-as (la fleur du myrte), fondation de la ville de Fès, par Abou I-Hasan 'Ali Djaznaï, texte et traduction, Alger, Carbonel, 1923.
- La religion musulmane en Berbérie, t. I, « Établissement et développement de l'Islam en Berbérie du VIIe au XXe siècle », Paris, Librairie orientaliste Paul Geuthner, 1938.
