= Graissac =

Part of Argences-en-Aubrac in Occitanie, France

- Part of Argences-en-Aubrac
- Location of Graissac
- Location within France Location within Occitanie
- Coordinates: 44°45′59″N 2°46′49″E
- Country: France
- Region: Occitania
- Department: Aveyron
- Arrondissement: Rodez
- Canton: Aubrac et Carladez
- Commune: Argences-en-Aubrac
- Area^{1}: 22.42 km^{2} (8.66 sq mi)
- Elevation: 915 m (3,002 ft)
- Highest elevation: 984 m (3,228 ft)
- Lowest elevation: 776 m (2,546 ft)
- Population (2018): 177
  - Density: 7.89/km^{2} (20.4/sq mi)
- Time zone: UTC+01:00 (CET)
  - Summer (DST): UTC+02:00 (CEST)
- Postal code: 12420
- ^{1} French Land Register data, which excludes lakes, ponds, glaciers > 1 km^{2} (0.386 sq mi or 247 acres) and river estuaries.

Graissac (French pronunciation: [ɡʁɛsak]) is a former commune in the Aveyron department in southern France. On 1 January 2016, it was merged into the new commune of Argences-en-Aubrac.

== Population ==
Historical population
Year	Pop.	±% p.a.
2006	219	—
2011	207	−1.12%
2018	177	−2.21%
Source: INSEE

== See also ==
- Communes of the Aveyron department
