= André Michel (art historian) =

French art historian (1853–1925)

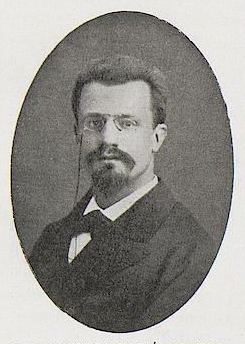
André Michel (1880s)

Charles Paul André Michel (7 November 1853, Montpellier - 13 October 1925, Paris) was a French art historian.

== Biography ==
He came from a Protestant family, and originally studied history at the University of Montpellier. From 1872 to 1876, he attended the University of Provence, where he obtained a law degree. Then, from 1877 to 1880, he was at the École Pratique des Hautes Études in Paris. While there, he also studied with Charles Blanc at the Collège de France, and Hippolyte Taine, at the École des Beaux-Arts.

Shortly after, he became an art critic for several magazines. From 1884, he was a regular contributor to the Gazette des Beaux-Arts and, from 1886, to the Journal des Débats. He taught art history at the École Spéciale d'Architecture from 1883 to 1893. He quit teaching to accept the position of assistant to Louis Courajod, curator of the Département des Sculptures at the Louvre. He succeeded Courajod in 1896, and began teaching at the École du Louvre.

In 1900, he was named a Knight in the Legion of Honor. In 1918, he was elected to the Académie des Beaux-Arts, where he took Seat #8 in the "Unattached" section; succeeding Louis de Fourcaud, who had died in 1914.

He left the Louvre in 1920 to become a professor of French art history at the Collège de France. His multi-volume magnum opus, Histoire de l'Art was left unfinished at his death. The final volume was published in 1929 by Paul Vitry, his successor at the Louvre.
