= Louis Courajod =

French art historian (1841–1896)

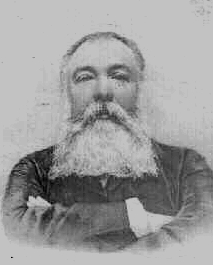
Louis Courajod (date unknown)

Louis Charles Jean Courajod (22 February 1841 – 26 June 1896) was a French art historian, museum curator and connoisseur-collector, who was born and died in Paris.

== Biography ==
Courajod was trained as a lawyer, then as an historian at the École Nationale des Chartes (1864–67), then served an apprenticeship at the Cabinet des estampes of the Bibliothèque Nationale, under chief curator Henri Delaborde, while he pursued his studies at the École Pratique des Hautes Études. His first publication (1867) was an article on the Plantagenet tombs at Fontevrault

In 1874 he began his career at the Musée du Louvre, developing at first his special interest in the Gothic sculpture of the 14th and 15th centuries, then turning to the art franc, of the Carolingians. In 1887, he was appointed a professor at the École du Louvre, teaching Medieval and Renaissance sculpture; he was director of the department from 1893. Among his students were André Michel, who succeeded him at the Louvre, and Paul Vitry.

Courajod was a regular contributor to the Gazette des Beaux-Arts. He served on the Commission des monuments historiques and was a member of the Société des Antiquaires de France.

Courajod introduced the term "International Gothic" to describe the Late Gothic movement expressed in sculptures and other media.

A commemorative memoir, Louis Courajod, un historien de l'art français, was published by Courajod's former pupil, Albert Marignan, in 1896.
