= Jean Alazard =

French art historian (1887–1960)

Jean Alazard

Jean Alazard (5 August 1887 – 3 October 1960) was a French art historian who was an expert on the art of the Renaissance and Orientalism.

== Early life ==
Alazard was born in Lacalm in the Aveyron. He attended the Lycée and moved to Italy, where he became an authority on the art of the Renaissance.

== Algeria ==
In 1921 Alazard moved to Algeria where he continued his research into Italian art and began to be interested in Orientalism.

Alazard was the first curator of the National Museum of Fine Arts of Algiers from 1930 to 1960.

== Selected publications ==
- Michelangelo Sculptures. Tudor Publishing, New York, 1965.
- The Florentine portrait. Schocken Books, New York, 1968.
- Ingres et L'Ingrisme.
- L'Orient et la peinture française.
