= Louis Hourticq =

French art historian

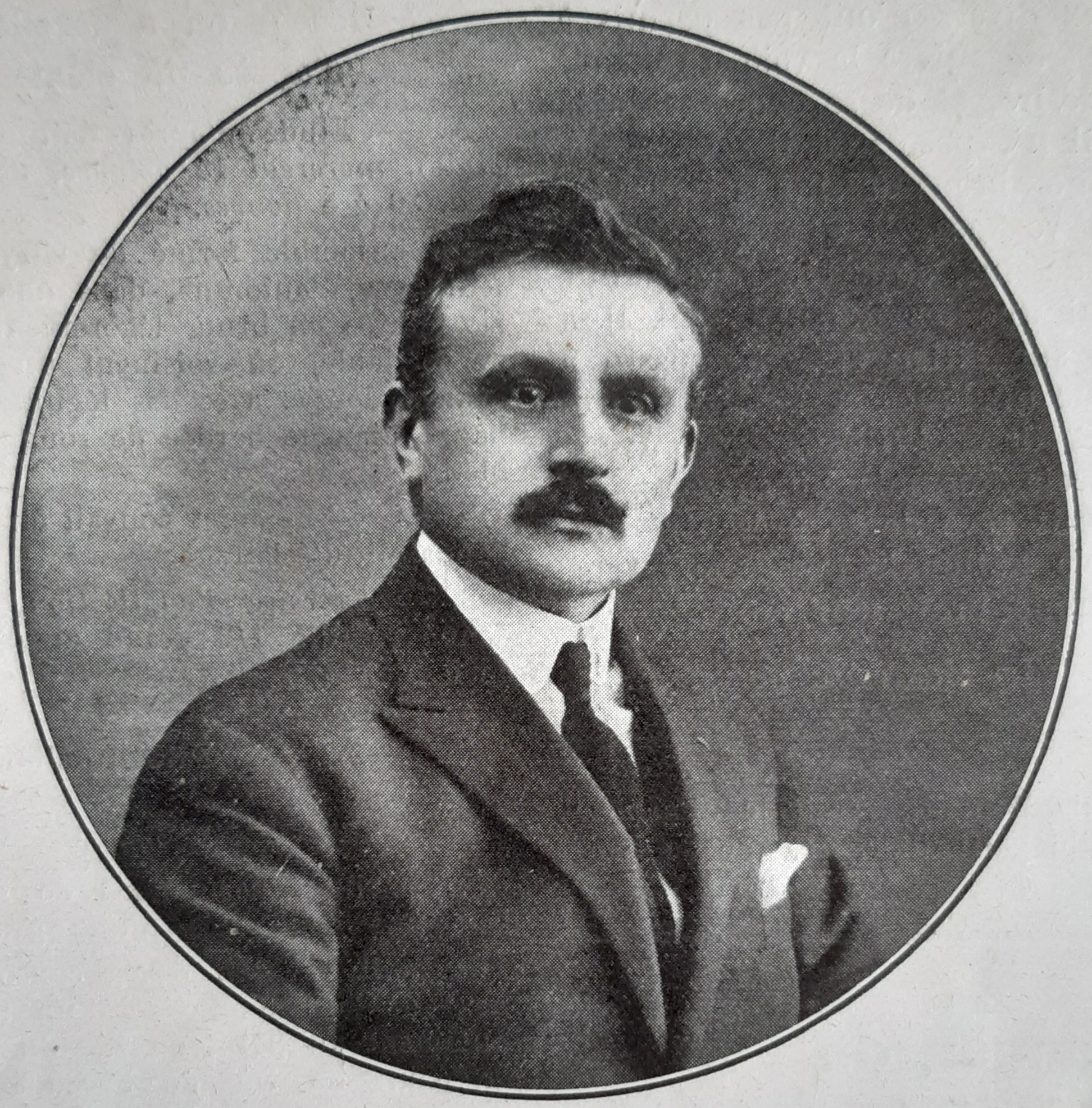
Louis Hourticq; from Le Moniteur du Dessin, #8 (1924)

Louis Edmond Joseph Hourticq (31 December 1875, Brossac - 15 March 1944, Neuilly-sur-Seine) was a French art historian, and popularizer of art appreciation.

== Life and work ==
In 1898, after completing his secondary studies at the Collège de Cognac, he went to Paris and entered the École Normale Supérieure. This was followed, in 1902, by a brief period as a substitute teacher at the Lycée Henri-IV. He passed his examination and became an agrégé in letters the following year.

From 1904 to 1906, he served as a substitute lecturer in art history at several girls' schools, including the Lycée Racine and the Lycée Lamartine. In 1906, he was named a sub-inspector of fine arts for the City of Paris. During his first period in office, he attended conferences in England (1911) and North America (1912), then served as Commissioner General for the Exposition d'Art Français in São Paulo (1913). The following year, shortly after the beginning of World War I, he was mobilized as an officer. His services earned him the Croix de Guerre.

Upon being discharged in 1918, he resumed his duties, but only for a year. Thanks to his doctoral thesis on the youth of Titian, published in 1919, he became a professor of art history and aesthetics at the École des Beaux-Arts. In 1924, he was appointed Inspector General of drawing education, a position he held until 1940. He was elected to the Académie des Beaux-Arts in 1927; where he took Seat#5 in the "Unattached" section. In his later years, he was a member of the Conseil supérieur de l'instruction publique, the Conseil supérieur des Beaux-Arts, and the Commission des Monuments historiques.

His notable writings include; De Poussin à Watteau, ou des origines de l'école parisienne de peinture, Hachette, 1921 (winner of the Charles-Blanc Prize, 1922), La Vie des images, Hachette, 1927, and L’Art et la Science. Flammarion, 1943.

== Sources ==
- Biographical notes and a critique of his works @ the Institut National d'Histoire de l'Art
- Biographical notes and references from the Comité des travaux historiques et scientifiques @ La France Savante
