= Vitrac-en-Viadène =

Part of Argences-en-Aubrac in Occitanie, France

- Part of Argences-en-Aubrac
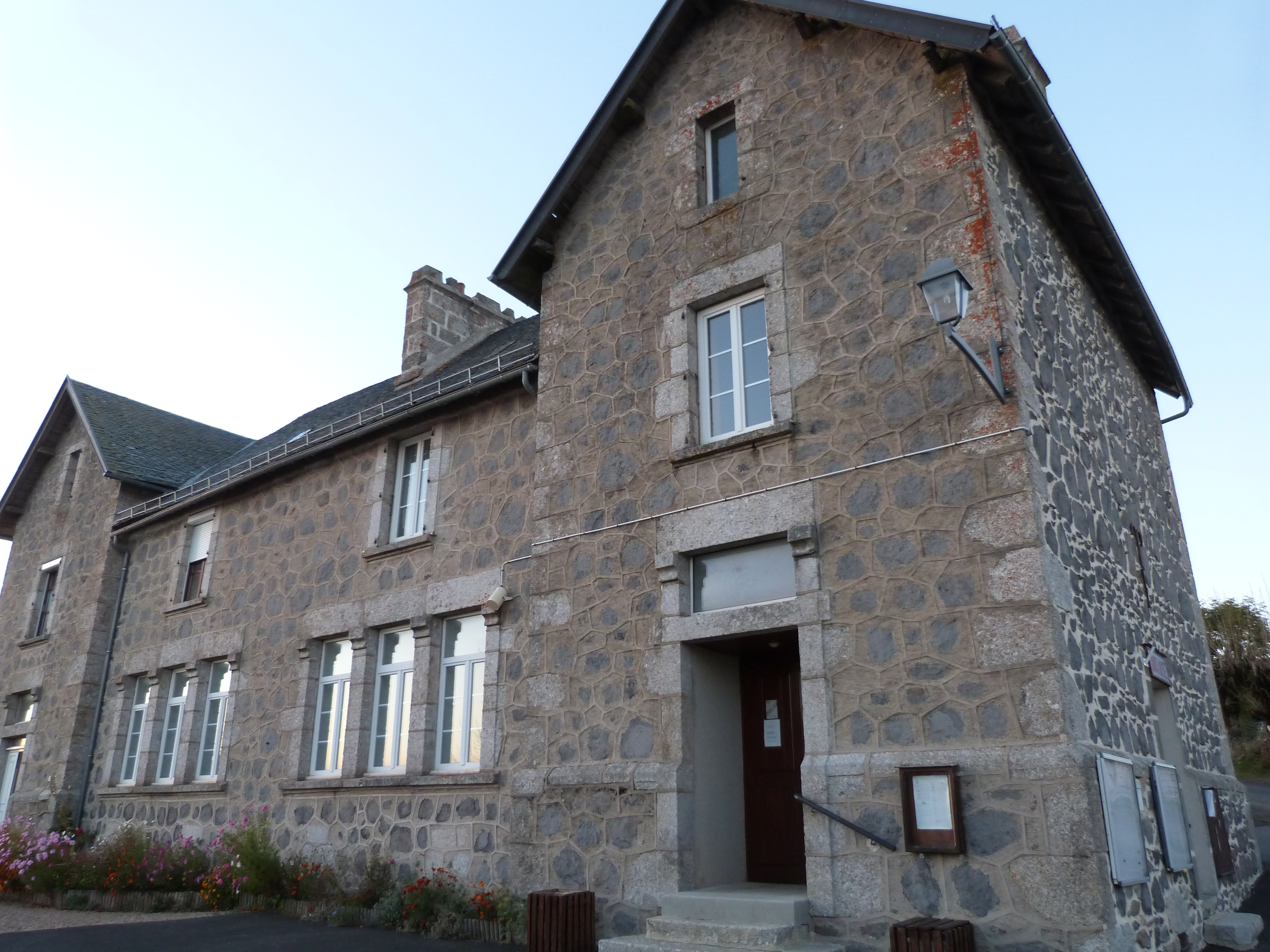
- Town hall
- Location of Vitrac-en-Viadène
- Location within France Location within Occitanie
- Coordinates: 44°47′45″N 2°50′06″E
- Country: France
- Region: Occitania
- Department: Aveyron
- Arrondissement: Rodez
- Canton: Aubrac et Carladez
- Commune: Argences-en-Aubrac
- Area^{1}: 16.99 km^{2} (6.56 sq mi)
- Elevation: 1,010 m (3,310 ft)
- Highest elevation: 1,102 m (3,615 ft)
- Lowest elevation: 858 m (2,815 ft)
- Population (2018): 93
  - Density: 5.5/km^{2} (14/sq mi)
- Time zone: UTC+01:00 (CET)
  - Summer (DST): UTC+02:00 (CEST)
- Postal code: 12420
- ^{1} French Land Register data, which excludes lakes, ponds, glaciers > 1 km^{2} (0.386 sq mi or 247 acres) and river estuaries.

Vitrac-en-Viadène (French pronunciation: [vitʁak ɑ̃ vjadɛn]) is a former commune in the Aveyron department in southern France. On 1 January 2016, it was merged into the new commune of Argences-en-Aubrac.

== Population ==
Historical population
| Year | Pop. | ±% p.a. |
|---|---|---|
| 2006 | 115 | — |
| 2011 | 113 | −0.35% |
| 2018 | 93 | −2.74% |
Source: INSEE

== See also ==
- Communes of the Aveyron department
