= Jules Combarieu =

French musicologist and music critic

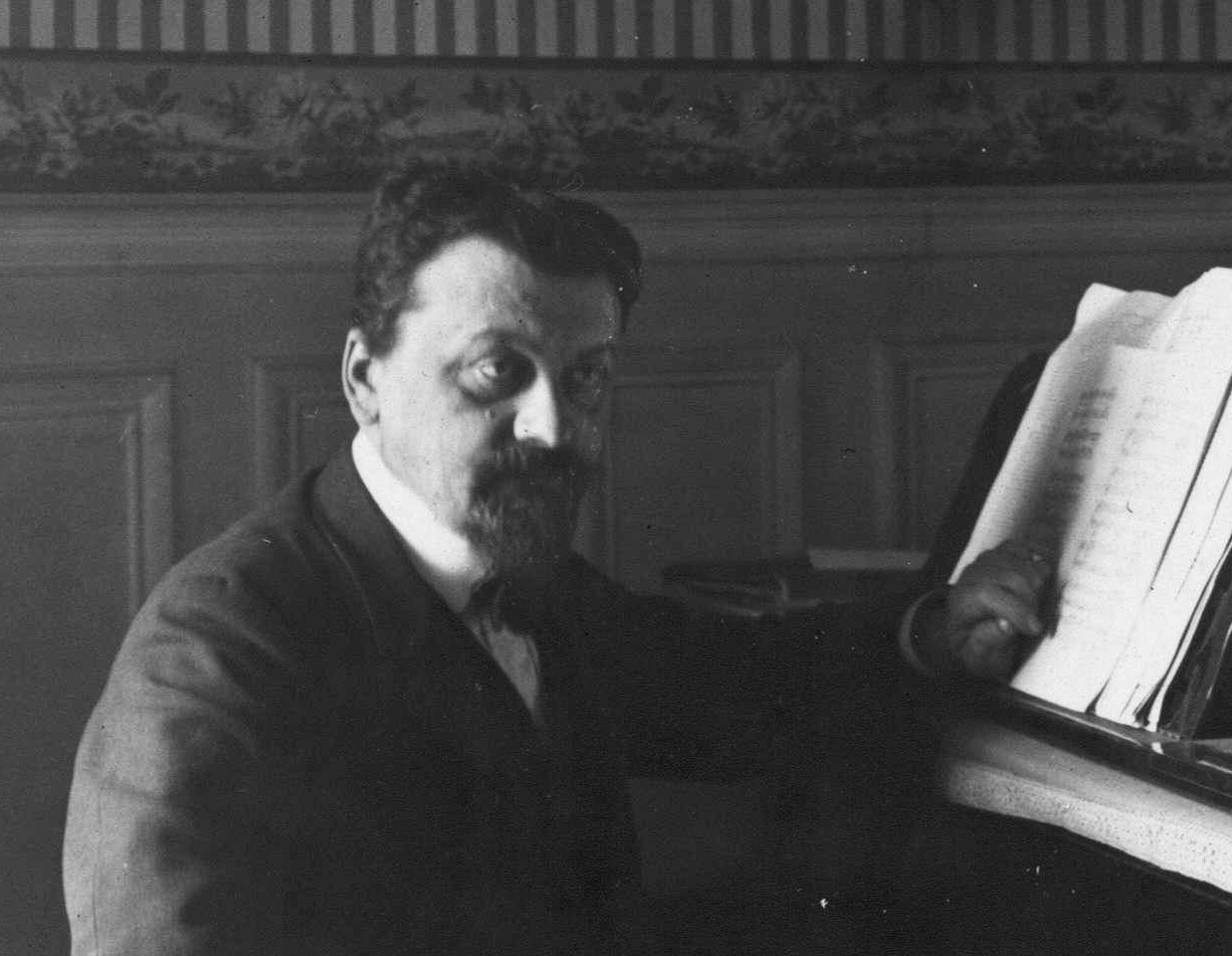
- Jules Combarieu, 1909
- Born: Jules Léon-Jean Combarieu; 4 February 1859; Cahors
- Died: 7 July 1916 (aged 57); Paris
- Occupation: Musicologist

Jules Léon-Jean Combarieu (4 February 1859 – 4 February 1916) was a French musicologist and music critic.

== Life ==
Like his elder brother, Abel Combarieu (born 30 January 1856 in Cahors) who was to become the Private Secretary of Président de la République Émile Loubet, Jules Combarieu was the son of Henri Combarieu, a printer, and Marie-Louise Salbant, who married in Quercy in 1855.

He first studied at La Sorbonne, then in Berlin with Philipp Spitta. He was first a professor of letters at the Lycee de Cahors. In 1884, he passed the "Agregation de Lettres". In 1894, he received the title of doctor of letters with Les Rapports de la Musique et de la poésie considérées au point de vue de l'expression. He then taught for a few years at the Lycée Louis-le-Grand.

In 1901, Combarieu founded the Revue d'histoire et de critique musicales, which became La Revue musicale in 1904 before merging with the journal of the Société internationale de musique (S.I.M.) in 1912.

Between 1904 et 1910, he was professor of music at the Collège de France.

His brother Abel Combarieu was the uncle of diplomat and writer Paul Morand, a member of the Académie française.

== Works ==
- Le Rapport de la poésie et de la musique considérée du point de vue de l'expression (thesis, 1893)
- "L'Influence de la musique allemande sur la musique française", in: Jahrbuch Peters (1895)
- studies in musical philology:
1. Théorie du rythme dans la composition moderne d'après la doctrine antique (1896)
2. Essai sur l'archéologie musicale au XXe et le problème de l'origine des neumes (1896)

– these two works were awarded the prize of the Académie)

1. Fragment de l'Énéide en musique d'après un manuscrit inédit (1898)
- Élément de grammaire musicale historique (1906)
- La Musique: ses lois, son évolution (Paris, Flammarion, 1907) Bibliothèque de philosophie scientifique (numerous editions in English), Prix Charles Blanc of the Académie française
- Histoire de la musique des origines au début du XXe (3 volumes, Paris 1913–19, an authoritative work – then 5 volumes with René Dumesnil, Armand Colin 1955–1960).
- Poésies de Valentin (Henri Bourette), (Ferdinand de Laroussilhe and Jules Combarieu) (Cahors: Lemerre, 1885)

== Sources ==
- Dictionnaire bibliographique des musiciens (éditions Robert Laffont).
