= Hubert Damisch =

French philosopher

Hubert Damisch (28 April 1928 – 14 December 2017) was a French philosopher specialised in aesthetics and art history, and professor at the École des Hautes Études en Sciences Sociales (EHESS) in Paris from 1975 until 1996. He was born and died in Paris.

Damisch studied at the Sorbonne with Maurice Merleau-Ponty and, later, with Pierre Francastel. In 1967 he founded the Cercle d’histoire/théorie de l’art that would later become the CEHTA (Centre d'histoire et théorie des arts) at the EHESS.

Damisch wrote extensively on the history and theory of painting, architecture, photography, cinema, theatre, and the museum. His works are landmark references for a theory of visual representations. He died on 14 December 2017, aged 89.

== Selected books in French ==
- 1966: Alexandres Iolas (éd.), Hubert Damisch, lettre à Matta. Matta, lettre à Hubert Damisch, New York, Genève, Milan, Paris.
- 1972: Théorie de la peinture. Pour une histoire de la peinture, Paris, Seuil.
- 1972: Théorie du nuage: pour une histoire de la peinture, Paris, Seuil, 1972.
- 1974: Huit thèses pour (ou contre ?) une semiologie de la peinture.
- 1976: Ruptures/Cultures. Paris, Éditions du Minuit, 1976.
- 1984: Fenêtre jaune cadmium ou les Dessous de la peinture. Paris, Seuil, 1984.
- 1987: L’origine de la perspective. Paris, Flammarion, 1987.
- 1992: Le jugement de Pâris. Iconologie analytique, I, Paris, Flammarion, 1992.
- 1993: L’Art est-il nécessaire?
- 1993: Américanisme et modernité. L'idéal américain dans l'architecture (co-directeur avec Jean-Louis Cohen), Paris, EHESS-Flammarion, 448 p. Lire le compte-rendu.
- 1995: Traité du trait: tractatus tractus, Paris, Réunion des Musées Nationaux, 1995.
- 1997: Skyline. La ville narcisse, Paris, Seuil, 1996.
- 1997: Un "souvenir d'enfance" par Piero della Francesca. Paris, Seuil, 1997.
- 1999: Hubert Damisch et Jacqueline Salmon, Villa Noailles, Marval.
- 2000: L’amour m'expose. Le projet Moves, Bruxelles, Y. Gevaert, 2000 [rééd., Paris, Klincksieck, 2007].
- 2001: La Dénivelée. À l'épreuve de la photographie, Paris, Seuil, 2001.
- 2001: La peinture en écharpe: Delacroix, la photographie, Paris, Klincksieck, 2001.
- 2004: Voyage à Laversine, Paris, Seuil, 2004.
- 2008: Ciné fil, Paris, Seuil, 2008.

== Books in English ==
- 1994: The origin of perspective; translated by John Goodman. Cambridge, Mass.: MIT Press, 1994. ISBN 0-262-04139-1
- 1996: The judgment of Paris; translated by John Goodman. Chicago: University of Chicago Press, 1996. ISBN 0-226-13510-1, ISBN 0-226-13512-8.
- 1997: Moves: playing chess and cards with the museum/Moves: schaken en kaarten met het museum; with an essay by Ernst van Alphen. Rotterdam: Museum Boijmans Van Beuningen, 1997. ISBN 90-6918-184-3.
- 2001: Skyline: the narcissistic city; translated by John Goodman. Stanford University Press, 2001. ISBN 0-8047-3245-0, ISBN 0-8047-3246-9.
- 2002: A theory of /cloud/: toward a history of painting; translated by Janet Lloyd. Stanford University Press, 2002. ISBN 0-8047-3439-9, ISBN 0-8047-3440-2.
- 2007: A childhood memory by Piero della Francesca; translated by John Goodman. Stanford University Press, 2007. ISBN 0-8047-3441-0, ISBN 0-8047-3442-9.
- 2016: Noah's Ark: Essays on Architecture; introduction by Anthony Vidler, translated by Julie Rose. MIT Press, 2016. ISBN 9780262528580, ISBN 9780262334990.

== Critical influence ==
- Baetens J. Exposer dans un musée. Une lecture sémiotique à partir du travail d’Hubert Damisch
- Bird J. Hubert Damisch. Oxford: Oxford UP, 2005.
- Bowman, M, “The Intertwining—Damisch, Bois, and October’s Rethinking of Painting” in Journal of Contemporary Painting, volume 5, issue 1, April 2019, pp. 99–116. doi: 10.1386/jcp.5.1.99_1
- Cohn, D. (ed.). Y voir mieux, y regarder de plus près: autour d’Hubert Damisch. Paris: Rue d’Ulm, 2003
