= Jacques-Gabriel Prod'homme =

French writer and musicologist

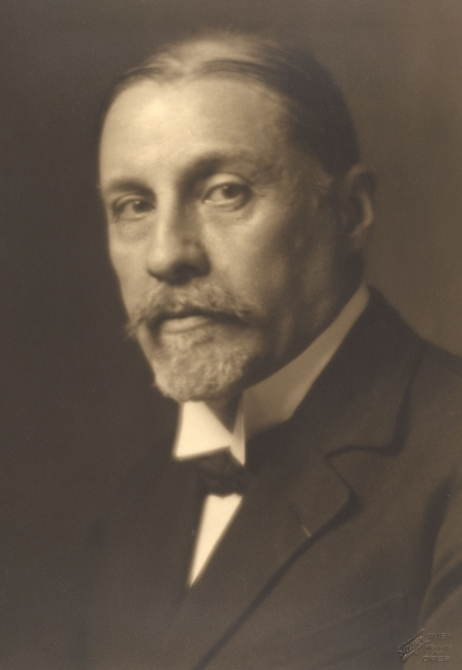
Jacques Gabriel Portrait

Jacques-Gabriel Prod’homme (28 November 1871, Paris – 18 June 1956, Paris) was a French musicologist and president of the Société française de musicologie, the French association of musicologists, in 1944.

== Books ==
- Les Menus Plaisirs du Roi. L'École Royale et le Conservatoire de Musique, with E. de Crauzat, collection « Paris qui disparaît », Delagrave, 1929.
- Vingt Chefs-d'œuvre jugés par leurs contemporains. Corneille, Montesquieu, Beaumarchais, Flaubert etc. Opinions, critics, selected correspondence and annotated by Albert Thibaudet, Stock, 1931.
- Hector Berlioz 1803–1869. Sa vie et ses œuvres, after new documents and the most recent work, followed by a musical and literary bibliography an iconography and a genealogy of the family of Hector Berlioz from the 16th, foreword by Alfred Bruneau, Paris, Ch. Delagrave, 1904; 1913.
- Gounod 1818–1893. Sa vie et ses œuvres d'après des documents inédits, with A. Dandelot, preface by Camille Saint-Saëns, deux volumes, Paris, Delagrave, 1911.
- Paganini, collection « Les Musiciens Célèbres », Henri Laurens, 1927.
- Voltaire raconté par ceux qui l'ont vu. Souvenirs, lettres, documents, etc., réunis, annotés et accompagnés de résumés biographiques, foreword by Édouard Herriot, to mark the 150th anniversary of the death of Voltaire, Paris, librairie Stock, Delamain et Boutelleau, 1929
- Gluck, Sefi, 1948.
- Franz Liszt, Portraits d'hier, deuxième année, numéro 43, 15 December 1910.
- W.A Mozart, sa vie et ses œuvres, Paris, Librairie Delagrave, 1925. Translation adaptation after the second edition of the book by A. Schurig.
- L'Opéra (1665–1925)., Paris 1925. Description du nouvel opéra.– Historique.– Salles occupées par l'opéra depuis son origine.– Dénominations officielles.– Directions.– Répertoire.– Principaux artistes.– Bibliographie. with a catalog of works presented at the Opéra since 1669.
- L'Immortelle Bien-aimée de Beethoven, « collection Petits Mystères de l'Histoire et de l'Art » (numéro 4). Paris, Éditions Glomeau, 1946.
- Napoléon – Lettres, Discours, Proclamations, Ordres, Messages, adorned with a portrait of Napoleon after Vignen, frontispiece, collection « Les plus belles pages », Paris, Mercure de France, 1938
- Vingt chefs-d'œuvre jugés par leurs contemporains (from Le Cid to Madame Bovary). Opinions, critiques, correspondances choisies et annotées, preface by Albert Thibaudet, Éd. Stock, 1930.
- François-Joseph Gossec (1734–1829 ). La Vie – Les Œuvres. – L'Homme et l'Artiste, Paris, La Colombe, 1949.
- Wagner et la France, éditions Maurice Sénart, 1921; Text on IA
- Pensées sur la Musique et les Musiciens, Paris, Heugel, 1926.
- La Toilette féminine à travers les âges de 1490 à 1645 et de 1645 à 1720, Nilsson, circa 1930, 2 vol.
- Beethoven raconté par ceux qui l'ont vu, Stock, 1927.
- Les Sonates pour piano de Beethoven, letter preface by Louis Barthou of the Académie Française, Paris, Delagrave, 1944.
- Les Symphonies de Beethoven, foreword by Édouard Colonne, Éditions Delagrave, 1906. Work crowned by the Académie Française (Prix Charles-Blanc)

== Translations ==
- Œuvres en prose de Richard Wagner, translated into French by J. -G. Prod’homme, in collaboration with Dr phil. F. Holl, F. Caillé et L. van Vassenhove, Librairie Ch. Delagrave, 13 volumes, 1907–1925.
- Richard Wagner, Les Maîtres Chanteurs de Nuremberg (Die Meistersinger von Nürnberg), three-act comédie lyrique, Librairie Delagrave. 1922. Translation in prose preceded by a notice by J.-G. Prod’Homme.
- W.- A. Mozart, La Flûte enchantée (The Magic Flute), two-part opera, poem by Ludwig Giesecke and Emanuel Schikaneder, French translation of the original libretto by J.-G. Prod’homme and Jules Kienlin.
