= La Terrisse =

Part of Argences-en-Aubrac in Occitanie, France

- Part of Argences-en-Aubrac
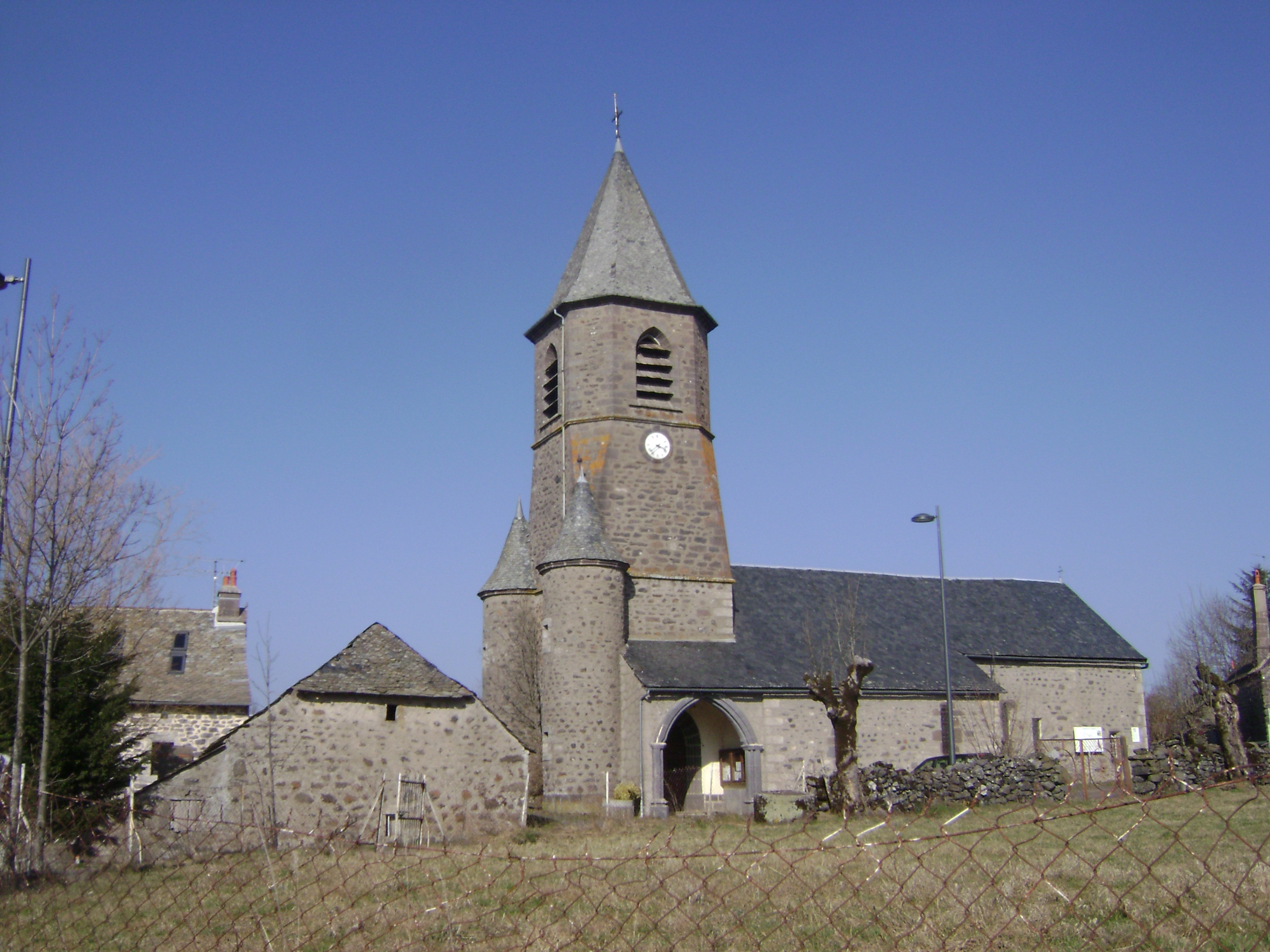
- The church in La Terrisse
- Location of La Terrisse
- Location within France Location within Occitanie
- Coordinates: 44°45′19″N 2°49′05″E
- Country: France
- Region: Occitania
- Department: Aveyron
- Arrondissement: Rodez
- Canton: Aubrac et Carladez
- Commune: Argences-en-Aubrac
- Area^{1}: 27.6 km^{2} (10.7 sq mi)
- Elevation: 980 m (3,220 ft)
- Highest elevation: 1,222 m (4,009 ft)
- Lowest elevation: 820 m (2,690 ft)
- Population (2018): 145
  - Density: 5.25/km^{2} (13.6/sq mi)
- Time zone: UTC+01:00 (CET)
  - Summer (DST): UTC+02:00 (CEST)
- Postal code: 12210
- ^{1} French Land Register data, which excludes lakes, ponds, glaciers > 1 km^{2} (0.386 sq mi or 247 acres) and river estuaries.

La Terrisse (French pronunciation: [la tɛʁis]) is a former commune in the Aveyron department in southern France. On 1 January 2016, it was merged into the new commune of Argences-en-Aubrac.

== Population ==
Historical population
Year	Pop.	±% p.a.
2006	167	—
2011	160	−0.85%
2018	145	−1.40%
Source: INSEE

== See also ==
- Communes of the Aveyron department
