= Jean-Paul Crespelle =

French journalist

Jean-Paul Crespelle (24 December 1910 – 1994) was a journalist and author. He was born in Nogent-sur-Marne, Île-de-France, France.

Crespelle wrote important historical works on the artistic and nocturnal life of the artists who gathered in Montmartre and Montparnasse at the turn of the 20th century.

== Works ==
(Partial bibliography)

- A la découverte de l'art dans les musées de Paris (1961)
- The Fauves (1962)
- Montparnasse vivant (1962) – Prix Hercule Catenacci
- Montmartre vivant (1964) – Prix Charles Blanc
- La folle époque: Des ballets russes au surréalisme (1968) – Prix Charles Blanc
- Picasso and his women (1969)
- Modigliani: Les femmes, les amis, l'œuvre (1969)
- The Love, The Dreams, The Life of Chagall (1969)
- Utrillo: La bohème et l'ivresse à Montmartre (1970)
- Degas et son monde (1972)
- Pablo Picasso (1975)
- La vie quotidienne à Montparnasse à la grande époque 1905-1930 (1976)
- La vie quotidienne des impressionnistes, 1863-1883 (1981)
- La vie quotidienne a Montmartre au temps de Picasso, 1900-1910 (1982)
- Monet : Chefs d'Â uvres (1986)
- La Epoca de Los Impresionistas (1990)
