= Louis Gillet =

French art historian and literary historian

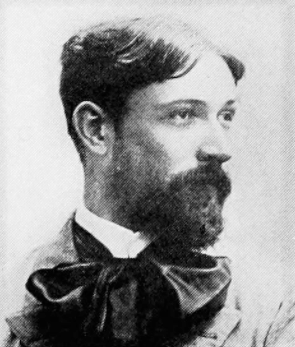
- Born: Louis-Marie-Pierre-Dominique Gillet; 11 December 1876; Paris, France
- Died: 1 July 1943 (aged 66); Paris, France
- Resting place: Père Lachaise Cemetery
- Education: Collège Stanislas de Paris; École normale supérieure
- Writing career
- Language: French
- Genre: Non-fiction
- Subject: Art

Louis-Marie-Pierre-Dominique Gillet (French: [lwi ʒilɛ]; 11 December 1876 – 1 July 1943) was a French art historian and literary historian.

== Life ==
Louis Gillet was born in Paris on 11 December 1876. He studied at the Collège Stanislas de Paris and the École normale supérieure. In 1900, he became a lecturer on the French at the University of Greifswald; from 1907 to 1909 he was a professor at the Université Laval in Montreal. He became an art critic in Paris, before entering the armed forces. Gillet contributed a number of articles to the Catholic Encyclopedia.

== Works ==
- Raphaël, 1907
- Watteau, 1921
- Trois variations sur Claude Monet, 1927
- Esquisses anglaises, 1930
- Shakespeare, 1931
- Essais sur l'art français, 1937, dedicated to Bernard Berenson.
