= Charles Blanc =

French art critic (1813–1882)

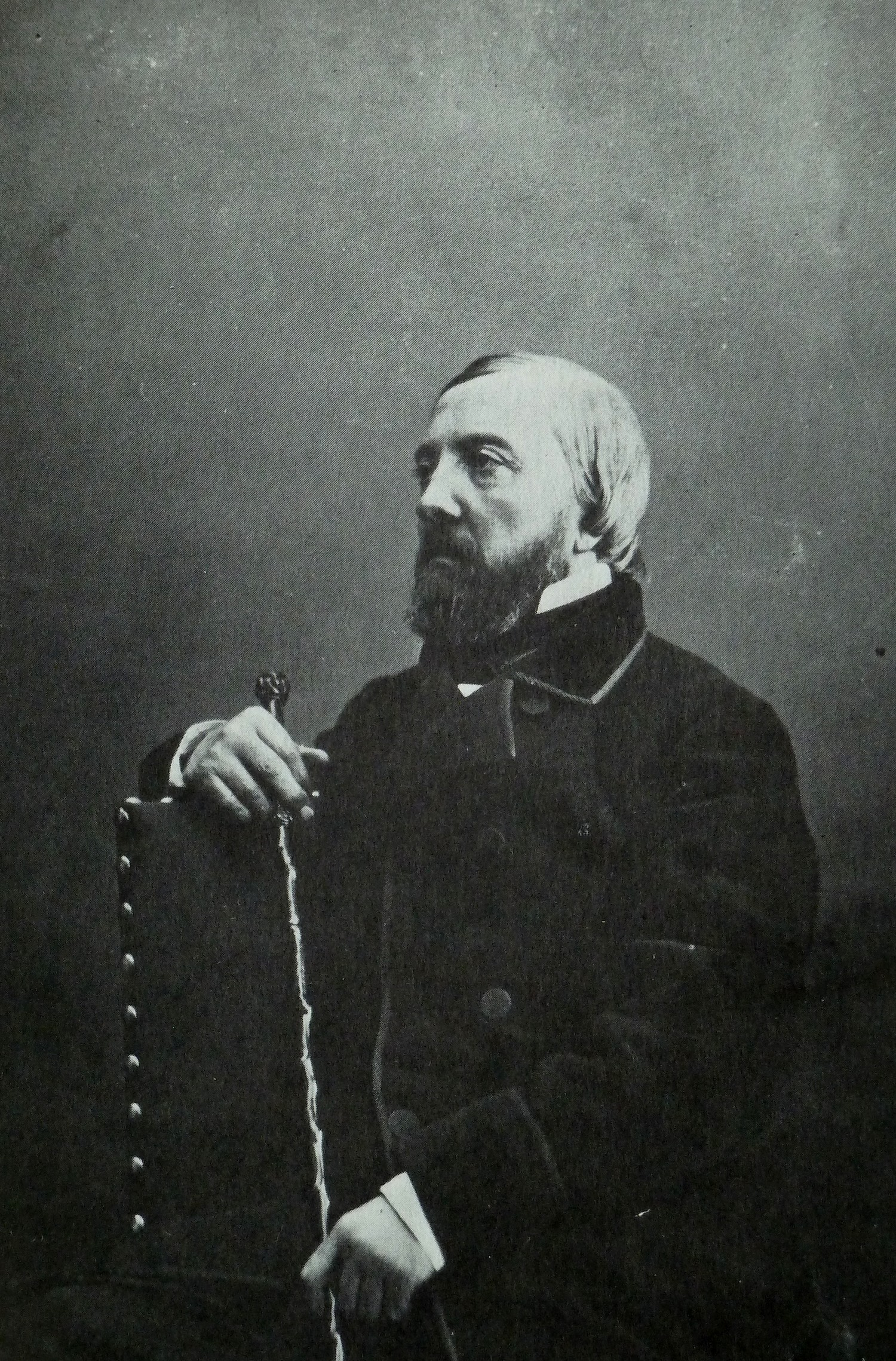
Portrait by Nadar, c. 1865

Charles Blanc's Color Star

Charles Blanc (17 November 1813, Castres (Tarn) – 17 January 1882, Paris) was a French art critic.

== Life and career ==
He was the younger brother of the French socialist politician and historian Louis Blanc. After the February Revolution of 1848, he was director of the Department for the Visual Arts at the Ministry of the Interior. As director of the École des Beaux-Arts he reinstituted a program of copying from casts after the antique and commissioned a series of copies of Old Masters for a projected "Musée des copies" that was objected to by the school's overseers, who cashiered Blanc.

He published the Histoire des peintres de toutes les écoles (Par. 1849–69, 14 vols.), which was translated into English and German.

In his book, Chromophobia, David Batchelor argues that Charles Blanc thought of color in art as something not to be totally relied upon. With regard to painting, Blanc says that while color is essential, its place is delegated behind the formal characteristics of composition, chiaroscuro and drawing.

Blanc is the namesake of the Charles-Blanc Prize.

== Works ==
- De Paris à Venise. 1828.
- Le trésor de la curiosité (1857–1858, 2 vols.)
- L'œuvre complet de Rembrandt (4. Aufl. 1873, 2 vols.)
- Grammaire des arts du dessin (1867, 3. Ed. 1876)
- Ingres, sa vie et ses ouvrages (1870)
- L'art dans la parure et dans le vêtement (1875)
- Les artistes de mon temps (1876)
- Voyage de la Haute-Égypte, observations sur les arts égyptien et arabe (1876)
