= Paul Léon =

French art professor and historiographer

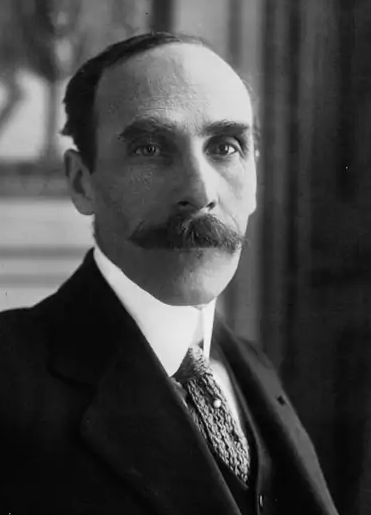
- Photograph by Louis Meurisse (1922)
- Born: 2 October 1874; Rueil-Malmaison, France
- Died: 1 August 1962 (aged 87); Chantilly, Oise, France
- Education: Baccalauréat
- Alma mater: Lycée Condorcet
- Occupations: Art professor; historiographer
- Spouse: Madeleine Alexandre (m. 1906)
- Children: 2

Paul Léon (2 October 1874 – 1 August 1962) was a French art professor and historiographer.

== Biography ==
He spent his childhood in Vosges, where his family originated. He attended college in Épinal. After receiving his baccalauréat, he continued his studies at the Lycée Condorcet. He passed his examinations and became an agrégé in 1898. After a few years of teaching, he was employed by the Ministry of Public Works, then became a contributor and staff member at the Annales de géographie.

In 1905, he found a position as chief-of-staff to the Undersecretary of State for Fine Arts, Étienne Dujardin-Beaumetz. The following year, he married Madeleine Alexandre; daughter of Paul Alexandre, Engineer for Bridges and Roadways. They had a son and a daughter. In 1907, he became chief of the architectural division at the Undersecretariat, a division he helped to create. In 1919, he was named the Director of Fine Arts and, in 1928, the Director General. During that time, in 1922, he was elected to the Académie des Beaux-Arts, where he took Seat #6 in the "Unattached" section. He held that position until his death forty years later.

He retired from his functions as Director General in 1933 to become a professor at the Collège de France, teaching the history of monumental art. He also was the principal historiographer in the service of France's Monuments Historiques. As were thousands of others, he was seriously affected by the "racial laws" of 1940/41, and took refuge in the zone libre. After the fall of the Vichy government, he was officially retired from the Collège.

During his retirement, he was a conservator at the Musée Condé in Chantilly, and President of the Artistic Council of the Réunion des Musées Nationaux. He wrote numerous books on the history of Paris and historic monuments.
