= Jules Écorcheville =

French musicologist and writer (1872–1915)

Jules-Armand-Joseph Écorcheville
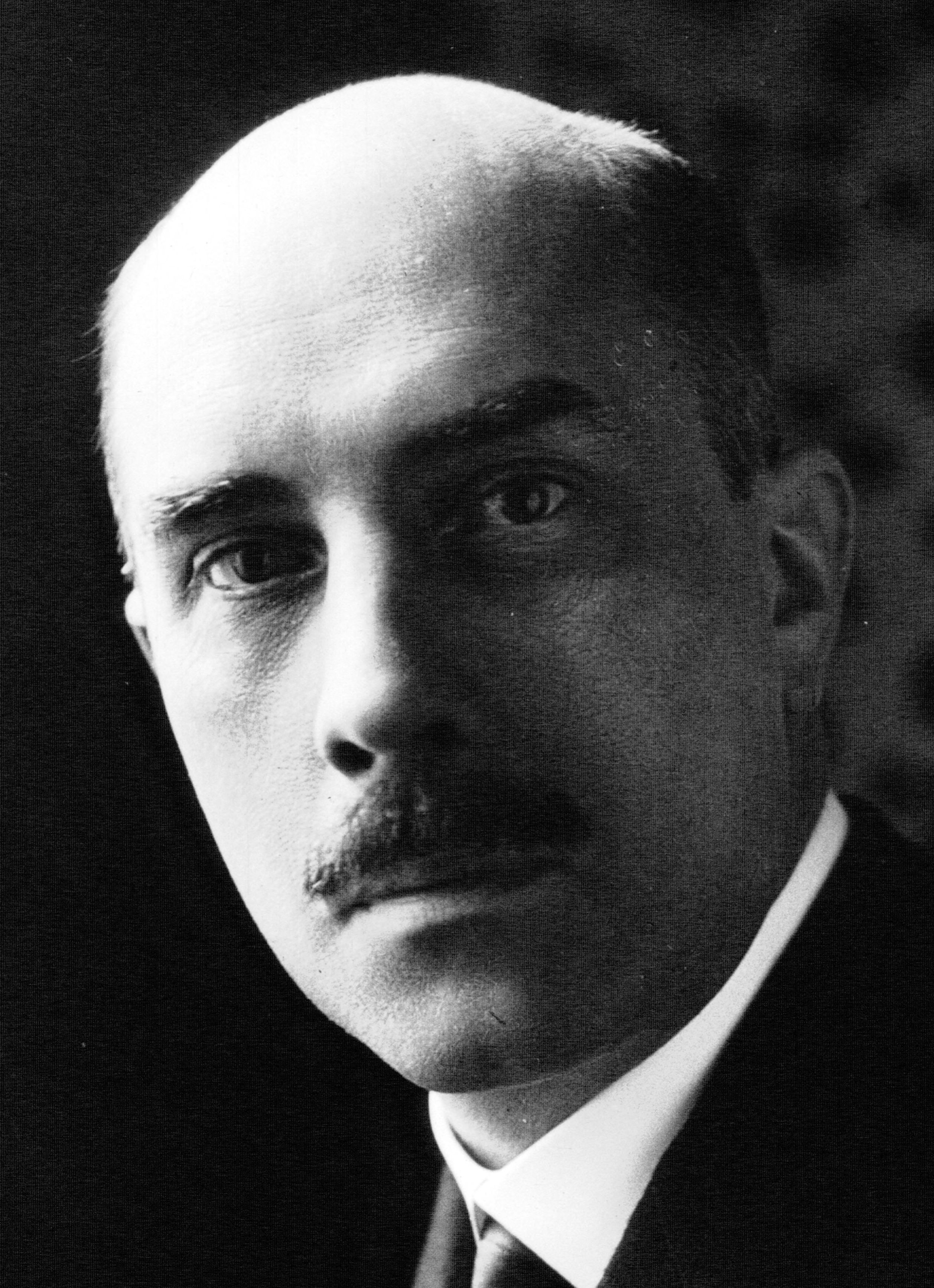
- Born: 1872
- Died: 1915 (aged 42–43); France
- Occupation: Musicologist

Jules-Armand-Joseph Écorcheville (17 March 1872, Paris – 19 February 1915, Perthes-lès-Hurlus, Marne) was a French musicologist and collector.

He studied literature and philosophy, caught interest in music (a student of César Franck from 1887 to 1890), in musicology (a student of Hugo Riemann in 1904–1905 in Leipzig), a discipline to which he devoted himself entirely after that period.

In 1912, he was elected president of the Société Internationale de Musique. Engaged in the French army during the First World War, he was killed during the assault of a German trench.

He had devoted the heritage of his parents to the acquisition of a rich collection of ancient instruments and books on music. The collection was dispersed in 1920.

== Works (out of more than 20 studies) ==
- Vingt suites d´orchestre du XVIIe siècle français: (1640–1670); publiées pour la première fois d'après un manuscrit de la Bibliothèque de Cassel et précedées d'une étude historique in 2 volumes, Paris 1906
- De Lulli (sic) à Rameau, 1690–1730 L'Esthetique Musicale, Paris 1906
- Catalogue du Fonds de Musique ancienne de la BN (Bibliothèque Nationale de France) in 8 volumes 1910–1914
