= Pierre Francastel =

French art historian (1900–1970)

Pierre Francastel (French: [fʁɑ̃kastɛl]; 8 June 1900 in Paris – 2 January 1970 in Paris) was a French art historian, best known for his use of sociological method.

== Career ==
Francastel's initial period of study was in literature, at the Sorbonne. He worked in building conservation at Versailles while undertaking research toward his doctoral degree, which was on the sculpture of Versailles, and in 1928 he published a monograph, including a critical catalogue, on the seventeenth-century French sculptor François Girardon. In 1930, he was appointed director of the Warsaw Institut français, and in 1936 he was appointed professor at the University in Strasbourg. In 1948, he was created inaugural Professor of the Sociology of Art at the École pratique des hautes études in Paris.

Francastel's research interests varied between the French seventeenth century and the nineteenth century, but his sociological methodology, strongly influenced by the work of Émile Durkheim, remained the intellectual basis upon which his scholarly thought and corpus were organised. Francastel is also noted for his promotion of spatial concerns, both physical and conceptual, prefiguring the "spatial turn" of later scholars such as Henri Lefebvre. Two of his key works, that emphasise Francastel's view of art as a system both embedded within and productive of social relations, are his Art et Sociologie (1948) and Peinture et Société (1951).

== Works ==
- Girardon. Biographie et catalogue critiques, l’œuvre complète de l’artiste (Paris, 1928)
- La sculpture de Versailles. Essai sur les origines et l’évolution du gout français classique (Paris, 1930)
- Peinture et société (Paris, 1951)
- Art et Technique aux 19e et 20e siècles' (Paris, 1956). English translation by Randall Cherry: Art & Technology in the Nineteenth and Twentieth Centuries (New York, 2000)
- La réalité figurative : éléments structurels de sociologie de l'art (Paris, 1965)
