= René Dumesnil =

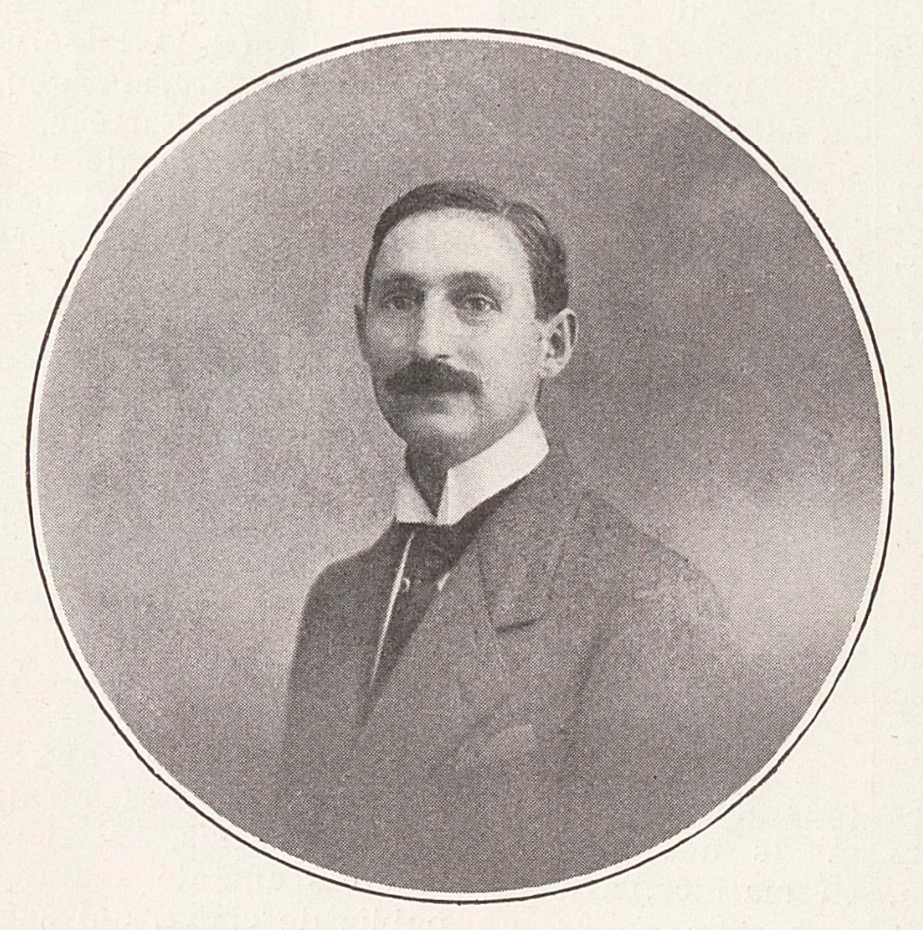
- René Dumesnil, in 1921
- Born: René, Alphonse, Adolphe Dumesnil; 19 June 1879; Rouen
- Died: 24 December 1967 (aged 88); Paris
- Occupations: Musicologist literary critic
- Spouse: Jeanne Bailly (1888-1972)

René Dumesnil (19 June 1879 – 24 December 1967) was a French physician, literary critic and musicologist.

Dumesnil studied literature at the Sorbonne and became a literary critic. Then he was music critic for Le Mercure de France and Le Monde.

He was elected a member of the Académie des beaux-arts in 1965. In addition to his publications in literature (numerous studies on Flaubert, Maupassant and realism, he has written a number of books on music. Dumesnil won four prizes awarded by the Académie française.

== Publications ==
His writings were published in Paris (unless otherwise stated).

=== Critics and literary history ===
- 1912: Autour de Flaubert, (in collaboration with René Descharmes)
- 1928: En marge de Flaubert
- 1928: La publication de Madame Bovary
- 1931: La publication d'En Route, by J.-K. Huysmans
- 1932: Gustave Flaubert, l'homme et l'œuvre
- 1933: La publication des Soirées de Médan
- 1936: L'Éducation Sentimentale de Gustave Flaubert
- 1939: Bibliographie de Gustave Flaubert, (in collaboration with D.-L. Demorest)
- 1945: La Vie littéraire et l'Époque réaliste et naturaliste
- 1945: Le grand amour de Flaubert
- 1947: Guy de Maupassant, l'homme et l'œuvre
- 1955: Le Réalisme et le Naturalisme

=== Musical critic ===
- 1921: Le Rythme musical; 2nd ed. augmented, 1949
- 1924: Le Monde des musiciens
- 1927: Le Don Juan de Mozart; 2nd ed. augmented, 1955
- 1928: Musiciens romantiques
- 1929: Richard Wagner
- 1930: La Musique contemporaine en France; 2nd ed. augmented 1949
- 1931: Le Livre du disque — with P. Hemarinquer
- 1934: Histoire illustrée de la musique
- 1936: Portraits de musiciens français
- 1945: La Musique romantique en France
- 1946: La Musique en France entre les deux guerres — Geneva
- 1949: L'Envers de la musique
- 1953: Histoire illustrée du théâtre lyrique; Grand prix de la littérature musicale
- 1954: Richard Wagner, a more important work than the one published in 1929
- 1964: L'Opéra
- 1965: Mozart présent dans ses œuvres lyriques — Brussels
- Histoire de la musique des origines à nos jours — with Jules Combarieu — 5 volumes, Armand Colin

=== Essays, history ===
- 1929: Supplément aux Ridicules du Temps, de Barbey d'Aurevilly
- 1935: La Seine normande
- 1936: Histoire illustrée de la Médecine
- 1938: L'Âme du Médecin

=== Novels and tales ===
- 1919: L'Absence
- 1924: Quatre histoires couleur des saisons

== Bibliography ==
- Dictionnaire bibliographique des musiciens — Éditions Robert Laffont
- G. Van der Kemp: Notice sur la vie et les travaux de René Dumesnil (1970)
