= Pierre Emile Lelong =

French painter (1908–1984)

Pierre Emile Gabriel Lelong (24 March 1908 – 29 June 1984) was a neo-Impressionist painter based in France, winner of the Grand Prix des Peintres Témoins de Leur Temps in 1972. He is considered one of the postwar group of artists referred to as “La Nouvelle Ecole de Paris.”

== Biography ==
Pierre Emile Lelong was born in 1908 in Neuilly-sur-Seine. His father, Albert Lelong, was a military man from Alsace; his mother, Marie Odette Collot, came from a Parisian family. She died when Pierre was six years old, at the outbreak of the First World War in 1914. Pierre was brought up largely by his grandmother, Madeleine Collot and his great-aunt Huguette. He began to draw and paint at an early age.

In the 1920s he took classes at the Atelier Julien in Paris, but stopped painting in his late teens and early twenties – the period during which he was required to complete his military service. After finishing his tour of duty, he went to work for an insurance company, Mutualité Agricole, where he had a successful career and was able to travel during his vacations.

In about 1933 he started to paint again and by 1935 had rented a studio in Montmartre (91, rue Caulaincourt). He continued to work for the insurance company and to travel. His work appeared in newspapers and magazines. He first exhibited his work at the Salon des Indépendants in 1935, and as part of a group at the Galerie Rotgé. He later destroyed much of his earliest work, so few paintings from this period survive.

Pierre Lelong married Marie-Rose Salvatori, whose family came from Trinidad, in July 1938, and the couple spent four months in Trinidad not long after the wedding. In 1939 he moved his studio to 30 quai de Passy (later the avenue President Kennedy).

When World War II broke out, he became a liaison officer for a British regiment. He was taken prisoner at Dunkirk and sent to Camp Oflag IV-D near Dresden. He spent his time sketching his fellow prisoners and the events in the camp. He was later transferred to an outpost of Stalag IV-A, at Zittau, near the Czech frontier. After at least one failed attempt at escape, he succeeded in 1942 and returned to France, where he turned his sketches into a book Une Vie de Camp, published in 1943. He spent the remainder of the war in Trinidad with his wife’s family.

During this period (1943–45), he worked on his painting technique, which had been interrupted by his earlier military service and professional career. He and his wife moved to New York City after the war, where their only son, Jean-François, was born. The family returned to France in 1947, and Lelong took a studio at 10, rue des Batignolles.

During the late 1940s, he produced illustrations for various journals, including Cavalcade, Paysage, La Pensée Française, Lisez-moi, Champs-Elysées, Paris-Dimanche, and Fantasia.

La Galerie Doucet arranged a solo exhibition for Pierre Lelong in 1950. Thereafter, he exhibited more and more frequently: the Salon d'Automne, the Salon de la Peinture à l’Eau, the Salon des Indépendants, the Salon du Dessin. His work became increasingly well-known and in 1956, he was invited to do a portrait of the composer Jacques Ibert. He was also commissioned to paint frescos for several institutional clients.

He spent most summers in the south of France, and created a large body of work depicting boats, beaches, bathers, and southern towns. A fall from a horse in March 1961 led to a spell in hospital, but he recovered and continued to paint. A monograph on his work by Gerard Mourgue was published later that year.

He exhibited in the Salon des Peintres Témoins de Leur Temps in 1963. In 1966 he moved to a studio at 74, rue des Plantes, in the 14th arrondissement.

As abstract art became more popular, he wrote articles defending figurative art, including “Pourquoi je suis figuratif” in Connaissance des Hommes in 1971.

He received the Grand Prix of the Peintres Témoins de Leur Temps in 1973 after a successful exhibit at the Galerie Minet. A retrospective of his work was mounted in Nice in 1974 at the Palais de la Méditerranée.

His last major exhibition was at the Galerie d’art de la Place Beauvau in 1980, a series of works depicting the city of Paris. His health began to fail the following year and he died on 29 June 1984. Six months later, his only son was killed in a car accident in Morocco.

== Examples of books illustrated by Pierre Lelong ==
Une vie de camp, preface by Henri Curtil, Presses Victor Michel, 1943.

Les cent nouvelles, special edition produced for the Cercle des Professeurs Bibliophiles de France, 1962.

L’Amour, edition prepared for Peintres Témoins de Leur Temps, 1964.

Les Français, edition prepared for Peintres Témoins de Leur Temps, 1966.

La Bruyère de Septembre, Yves Frontenac, SNPMD Publishers, 1972.

L’Escalier de la Nuit, Yves Frontenac, SNPMD Publishers, 1973.

L’Art d’Aimer, Ovid, Moulin de Vauboyen–Pierre de Tartas. 1973.

L’Art d’Aimer, Ovid, translation by Pirault des Chaumes, Editions Roissard, 1979.

== Awards ==
Prix des Beaux Arts, 1945.

Prix Othon Friesz, finalist, 1952.

Prix Portier, 1955.

Prix de la Biennale de Menton, 1957.

Chevalier de la Légion d’Honneur, 1959.

Grand Prix des Peintres Témoins de Leur Temps, 1972.

== Solo exhibitions ==
Galerie Maurice Deuillet, Paris, 1958.

Galerie Carlier, Paris, 1959.

Leicester Galleries, London, 1960.

Galerie Carlier, Paris, 1961.

Galerie Walter, New York, 1967.

Galerie Mirage, Montpellier, 1968.

Galerie Carlier, Paris, 1969.

Galerie Walter, New York, 1970.

Distelheim Galleries, Chicago, 1971.

Galerie Squarcifichi, Tokyo, 1972.

Galerie d’art de la Place Beauvau, Paris, 1972.

Galerie 65, Cannes, 1973.

Galerie d’art de la Place Beauvau, Paris, 1973.

Retrospective, Palais de la Méditerranée, Nice, 1974.

Galerie d’art de la Place Beauvau, Paris, 1976.

Galerie de Noyers, Yonne, 1977.

Galerie d’art de la Place Beauvau, Paris, 1978.

Galerie Squarcifichi, Tokyo, 1979.

Galerie d’art de la Place Beauvau, Paris, 1980.

Galerie Triade, Barbizon, 1987.
