= Adolphe Boschot =

French music critic

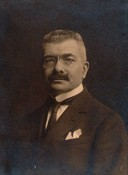
Adolphe Boschot

Adolphe Boschot (4 May 1871 in Fontenay-sous-Bois – 1 June 1955 in Neuilly-sur-Seine) was a French essayist, musicologist, and music critic.

== Publications ==
- La Crise poétique, and also Le Poète, les Courtisanes et l’Amour, Perrin, Paris, 1897
- Poèmes dialogués, Perrin, Paris, 1901
- L'histoire d'un romantique : Hector Berlioz.
1. La jeunesse d'un romantique : Hector Berlioz, 1803-1831, d'après de nombreux documents inédits, Plon, Paris, 1906 (Many subsequent reprints)
2. Un romantique sous Louis-Philippe : Hector Berlioz 1831–1842, d'après de nombreux documents inédits, Plon, Paris, 1908 (Many subsequent reprints)
3. Le crépuscule d'un romantique : Hector Berlioz 1842-1869, d'après de nombreux documents inédits, Plon, Paris, 1913 (Many subsequent reprints)
- Le Faust de Berlioz : Étude sur la "Damnation de Faust" et sur l'âme romantique, Costallat, Paris, 1910 (reprint: éd. musicales de la librairie de France, Paris, 1927; Plon, Paris, 1945)
- Une Vie romantique. Hector Berlioz, Plon, Paris, 1920
- Chez nos Poètes, Plon, Paris, 1925
- La lumière de Mozart, Plon, Paris, 1928. Reprinted in 1941: La lumière de Mozart. Florilège. Plon. Éditions d'histoire et d'art, Paris
- Le mystère musical, Plon, Paris, 1929
- La musique et la vie, Plon, Paris, 1931
- Mozart, Plon, Paris, 1935
- Musiciens poètes : Bach, Mozart, Beethoven, Schubert, Liszt, Chopin, Plon, Paris, 1937
- Portraits de musiciens, Plon, Paris, 1946
- Souvenirs d'un autre siècle, Plon, Paris, 1946
