= Lacalm =

Part of Argences-en-Aubrac in Occitanie, France

- Part of Argences-en-Aubrac
- Location of Lacalm
- Location within France Location within Occitanie
- Coordinates: 44°46′19″N 2°52′58″E
- Country: France
- Region: Occitania
- Department: Aveyron
- Arrondissement: Rodez
- Canton: Aubrac et Carladez
- Commune: Argences-en-Aubrac
- Area^{1}: 26.49 km^{2} (10.23 sq mi)
- Elevation: 1,130 m (3,710 ft)
- Highest elevation: 1,284 m (4,213 ft)
- Lowest elevation: 981 m (3,219 ft)
- Population (2018): 166
  - Density: 6.27/km^{2} (16.2/sq mi)
- Time zone: UTC+01:00 (CET)
  - Summer (DST): UTC+02:00 (CEST)
- Postal code: 12210
- ^{1} French Land Register data, which excludes lakes, ponds, glaciers > 1 km^{2} (0.386 sq mi or 247 acres) and river estuaries.

Lacalm (French pronunciation: [lakalm]; Languedocien: La Calm) is a former commune in the Aveyron department in southern France. On 1 January 2016, it was merged into the new commune of Argences-en-Aubrac. Lacalm is located northwest of the plateau of Aubrac, in contact with the Viadène on Lebot river. Its area is 2649 hectares ( 26.49 km2 ) with an altitude between 981 meters and 1284 meters. The Church of Lacalm is very old, with two very distinct parts, the actual church is Romanesque, with a semi-circular apse and the bell tower is square and no particular style. A plausible explanation is that the main tower of the fort of Lacalm may have been moved to serve both as a watchtower and bell tower, without attracting the attention of English by the presence of a military structure. The Church of Lacalm, characteristic of Romanesque style, contains a massive arch resting on two columns semicircular in capitals representing the fighters carrying an oval shield, which would place it was built around the eleventh century. We also note the presence of a splendid way of the cross and the arms of the Rolland bugle.

== Population ==
Historical population
Year	Pop.	±% p.a.
2006	204	—
2011	190	−1.41%
2018	166	−1.91%
Source: INSEE

== See also ==
- Communes of the Aveyron department
