= List of Académie des Beaux-Arts members: Unattached =

This is a list of past and present members of the Académie des Beaux-Arts in Section VI: Unattached ("Free").

== Seat #1 ==
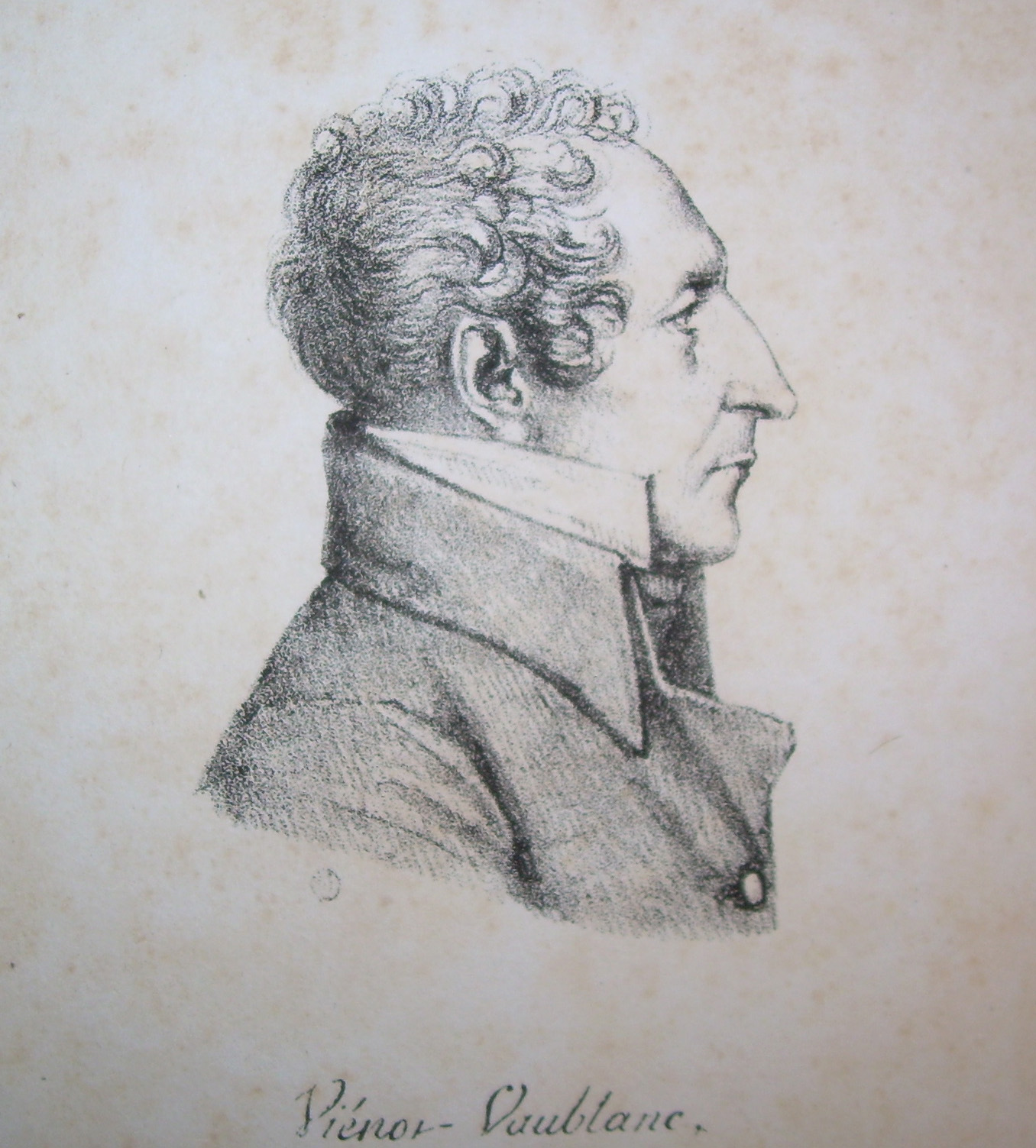
The Comte de Vaublanc

- elected 1816: Comte de Vaublanc (1756–1846)
- 1845: Alphonse de Cailleux (1787–1876)
- 1876: Émile Perrin (1815–1885)
- 1885: Alphonse de Rothschild (1827–1905)
- 1905: Paul Richer (1849–1933)
- 1934: David David-Weill (1871–1952)
- 1953: Albert Sarraut (1872–1962)
- 1964: Robert Rey (1888–1964)
- 1965: André Arbus (1903–1969)
- 1970: Pierre David-Weill (1900–1975)
- 1975: Germain Bazin (1901–1990)
- 1991: Marcel Marceau (1923–2007)
- 2008: William Christie (born 1944)

== Seat #2 ==
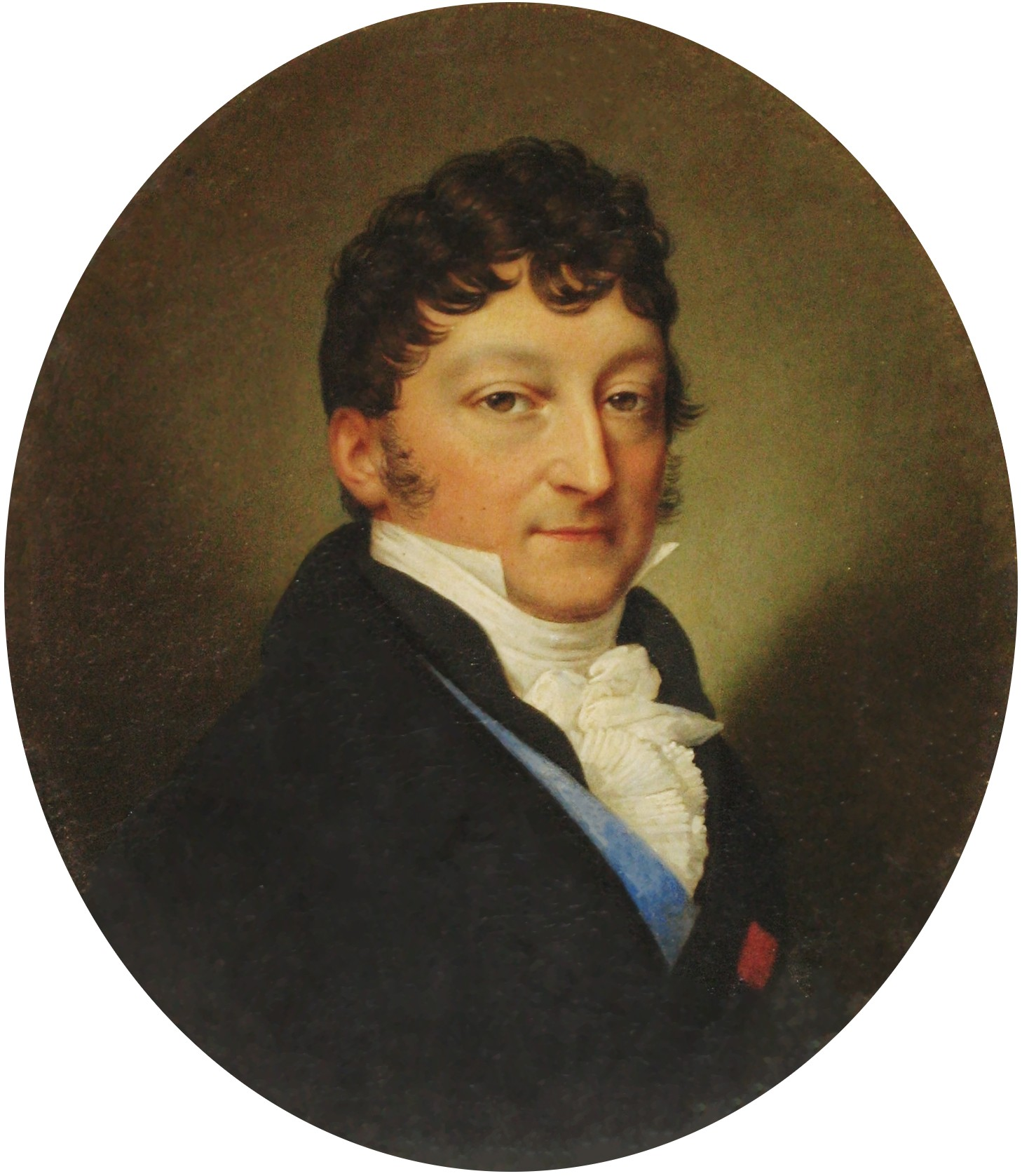
Pierre Blacas d'Aulps

- 1816: Pierre Blacas d'Aulps (1771–1839)
- 1839: Aristide-Laurent Dumont (1790–1853)
- 1853: Émilien de Nieuwerkerke (1811–1892)
- 1892: Emile Michel (1828–1909)
- 1909: Jules Comte (1846–1912)
- 1913: Henry Lemonnier (1842–1936)
- 1937: Maurice de Rothschild (1881–1957)

This seat was eliminated in 1959.

== Seat #3 ==
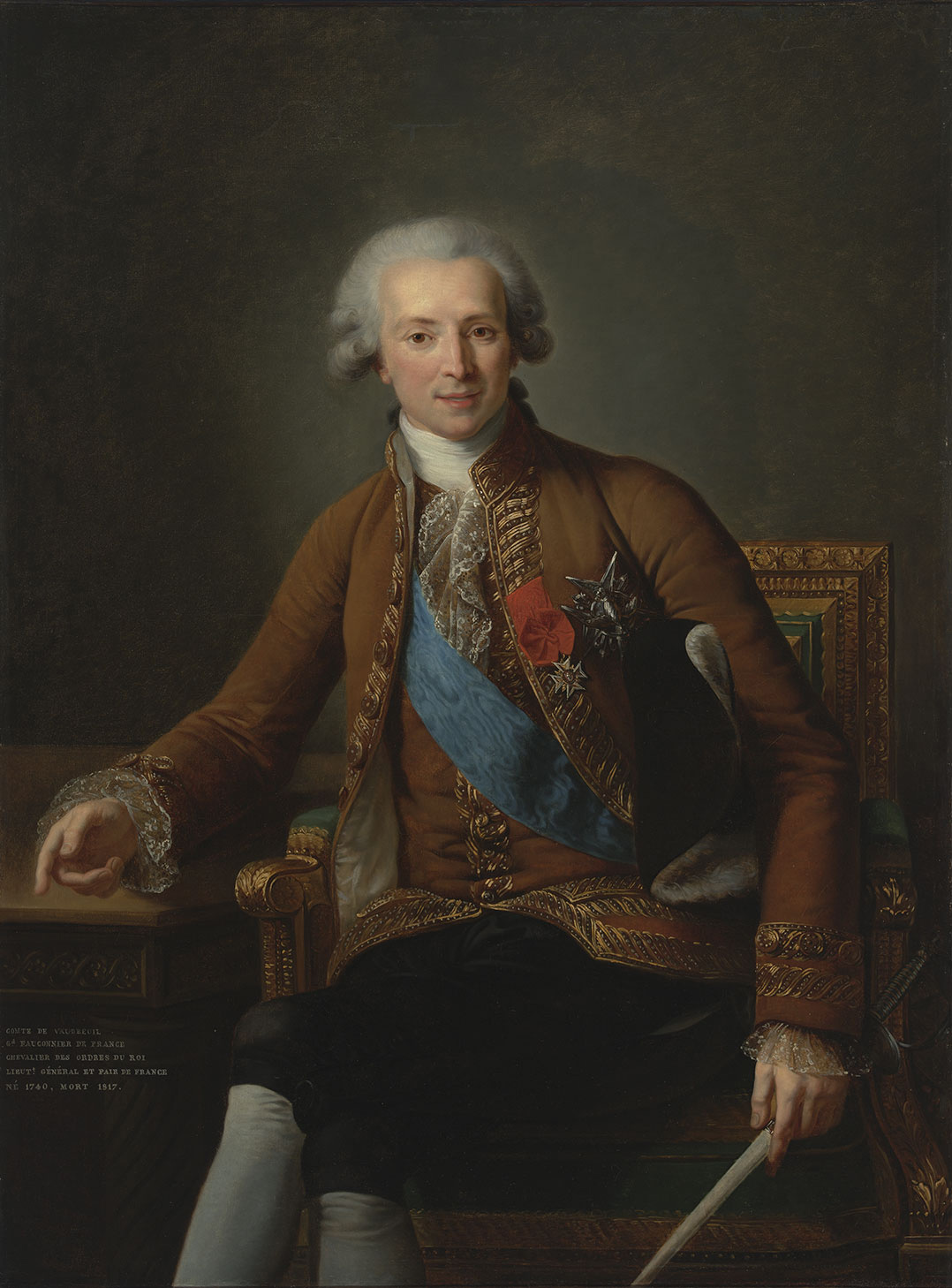
The Comte de Vaudreuil

- 1816: Comte de Vaudreuil (1740–1817)
- 1817: Duc de Richelieu (1766–1822)
- 1822: Jacques Lauriston (1768–1828)
- 1828: Comte Siméon (1781–1846)
- 1846: Tanneguy Duchâtel (1803–1867)
- 1868: Henri Delaborde (1811–1899)
- 1874: Étienne de Cardaillac (1818–1879)
- 1880: Duc d'Aumale (1822–1897)
- 1897: Prince d'Arenberg (1837–1924)
- 1924: Jacques Rouché (1862–1957)
- 1958: Raymond Subes (1891–1970)
- 1971: Daniel Wildenstein (1917–2001)
- 2002: Hugues Gall (born 1940–2024)

== Seat #4 ==
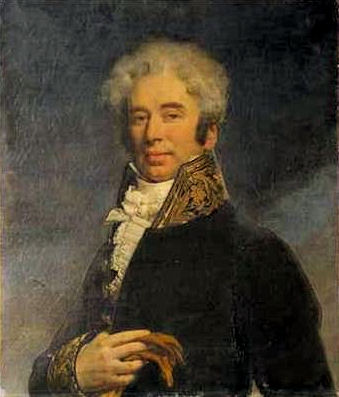
The Comte de Pradel

- 1816: Comte de Pradel (1779–1857)
- 1857: Achille Fould (1800–1867)
- 1867: Baron Haussmann (1809–1891)
- 1891: Jean-Charles Adolphe Alphand (1817–1891)
- 1892: Georges Lafenestre (1837–1919)
- 1919: Vicomte de Castelnau (1851–1944)
- 1945: Paul-André Lemoisne (1875–1964)
- 1965: Paul-Louis Weiller (1893–1993)
- 1994: Maurice Béjart (1927–2007)
- 2017: Muriel Mayette-Holtz (born 1964)

== Seat #5 ==
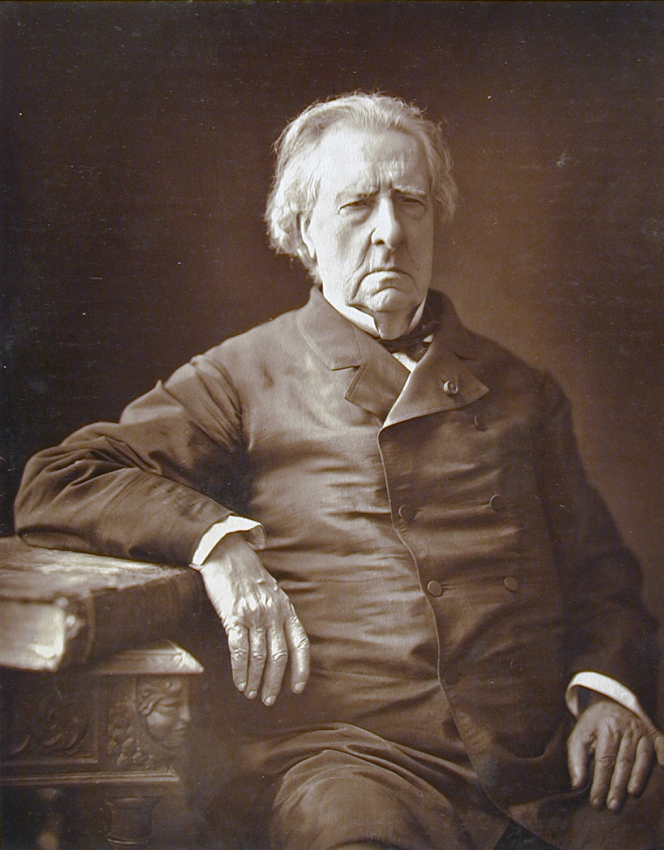
Baron Taylor

- 1816: Antoine-Laurent Castellan (1772–1838)
- 1838: Comte de Clarac (1777–1847)
- 1847: Baron Taylor (1789–1879)
- 1879: Marquis de Chennevières (1820–1899)
- 1899: Henry Roujon (1853–1914)
- 1903: Georges Berger (1834–1910)
- 1910: Théophile Homolle (1848–1925)
- 1925: Etienne Moreau-Nelaton (1859–1927)
- 1927: Louis Hourticq (1875–1944)
- 1945: François Labrousse (1878–1951)
- 1952: Julien Cain (1887–1975)
- 1975: Bernard Gavoty (1908–1981)
- 1982: Michel David-Weill (1932–2022)
- 2026: Guy Savoy (b. 1953)

== Seat #6 ==
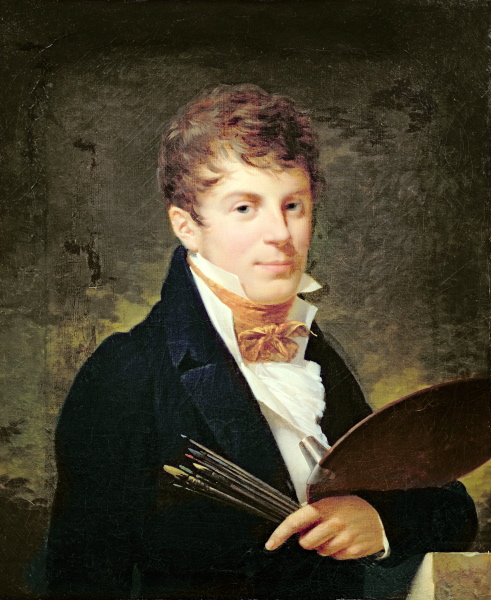
The Comte de Turpin de Crissé

- 1816: Comte de Turpin de Crissé (1782–1859)
- 1859: Jean-Georges Kastner (1810–1867)
- 1868: Comte de Walewski (1810–1868)
- 1868: Charles Blanc (1813–1882)
- 1882: Edmond Du Sommerard (1817–1885)
- 1885: Léon Heuzey (1831–1922)
- 1922: Paul Léon (1874–1962)
- 1963: Georges Wildenstein (1892–1963)
- 1965: René Dumesnil (1879–1967)
- 1968: Gérald Van der Kemp (1912–2002)
- 2005: Marc Ladreit de Lacharriere (born 1940)

== Seat #7 ==
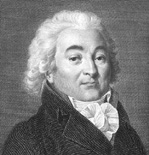
The Comte de Choiseul-Gouffier

- 1816: Comte de Choiseul-Gouffier (1752–1817)
- 1817: Comte de Chabrol de Volvic (1773–1843)
- 1843: Comte de Rambuteau (1781–1869)
- 1869: Albert Lenoir (1801–1891)
- 1891: Georges Duplessis (1834–1899)
- 1899: Jules-Joseph Guiffrey (1840–1918)
- 1919: Maurice Fenaille (1855–1937)
- 1938: Gabriel Cognacq (1880–1951)
- 1952: Louis Hautecœur (1884–1973)
- 1975: Pierre Dehaye (1921–2008)
- 2017: Adrien Goetz (born 1966)

== Seat #8 ==
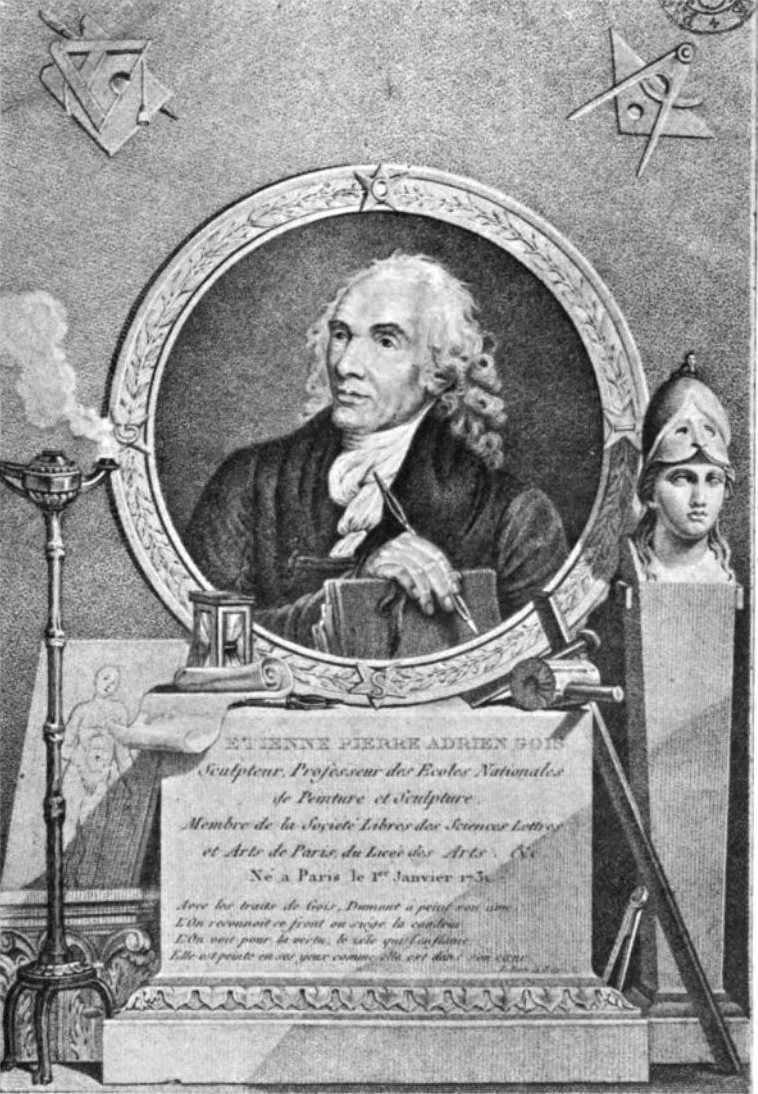
Étienne-Pierre-Adrien Gois

- 1816: Étienne-Pierre-Adrien Gois (1731–1823)
- 1823: Amédée de Pastoret (1791–1857)
- 1857: Prince Napoléon Bonaparte (1822–1891)
- 1891: Gustave Larroumet (1852–1903)
- 1898: Henri Delaborde (1811–1899)
- 1899: Philippe Gille (1830–1901)
- 1901: Édouard Aynard (1837–1913)
- 1913: Louis de Fourcaud (1851–1914)
- 1918: André Michel (1853–1925)
- 1926: Adolphe Boschot (1871–1955)
- 1937: Henri Verne (1880–1949)
- 1949: Jean Bourguignon (1876–1953)
- 1954: Charles Kunstler (1887–1977)
- 1978: Pierre Dux (1908–1990)
- 1992: Pierre Cardin (1922–2020)

== Seat #9 ==
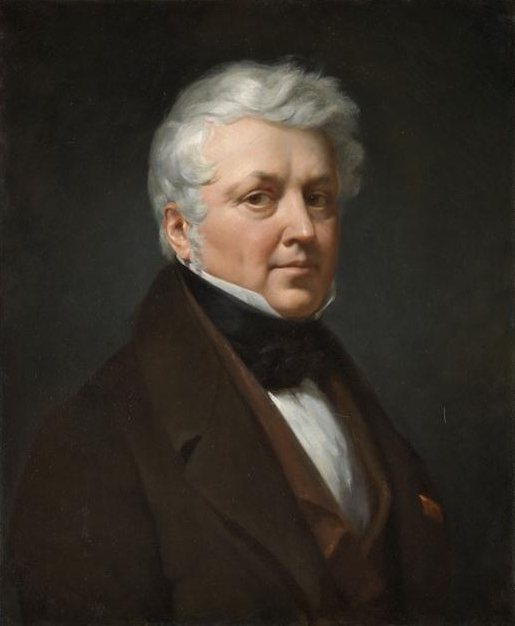
Frédéric-Christophe d'Houdetot

- 1816: Comte de Forbin (1777–1841)
- 1841: Frédéric-Christophe d'Houdetot (1778–1859)
- 1859: Frédéric Bourgeois de Mercey (1803–1860)
- 1860: Jules Pelletier (1823–1875)
- 1875: François-Anatole Gruyer (1825–1909)
- 1890: Justin de Selves (1818–1934)
- 1935: René Baschet (1860–1949)
- 1950: Arnauld Doria (1890–1977)
- 1979: Marcel Carné (1906–1996)

This seat was transferred to section VII in 1985.

== Seat #10 ==
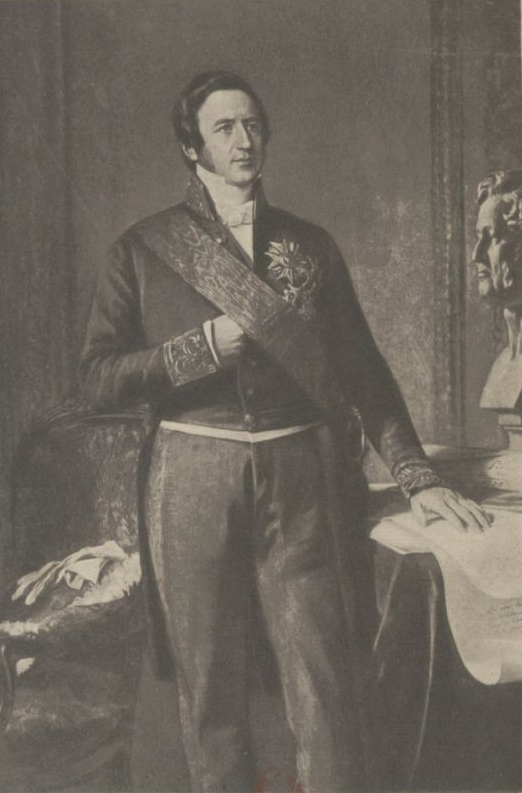
The Comte de Montalivet

- 1816: Alexandre de La Motte-Baracé (1781–1840)
- 1840: Comte de Montalivet (1801–1880)
- 1880: Henry Barbet de Jouy (1812–1896)
- 1896: Édouard Corroyer (1835–1904)
- 1904: Henri Bouchot (1849–1906)
- 1906: Edmond de Rothschild (1845–1934)
- 1935: Lucien Lacaze (1860–1955)
- 1955: Jacques Jaujard (1895–1967)
- 1968: Gaston Palewski (1901–1984)
- 1985: Louis Pauwels (1920–1997)
- 1997: Henri Loyrette (born 1952)

== Seat #11 ==
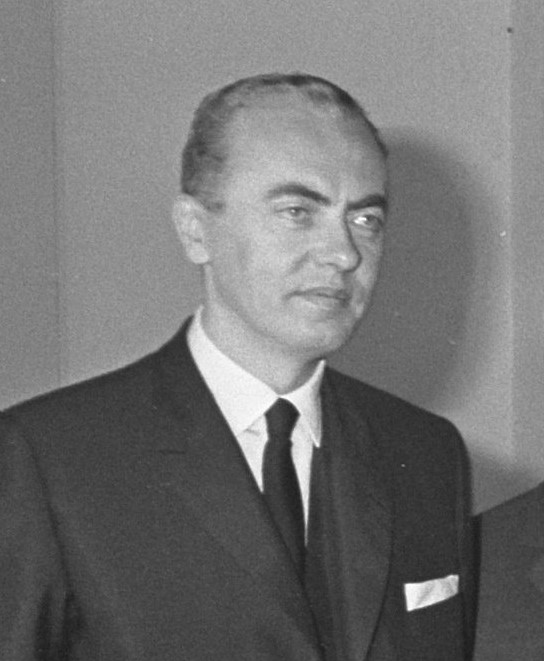
André Bettencourt

Seat created by decree on 18 June 1946

- 1947: Louis Réau (1881–1961)
- 1962: André Cornu (1892–1980)
- 1981: Michel Faré (1913–1985)
- 1986: André Bettencourt (1919–2007)
- 2010: Patrick de Carolis (born 1953)

== Seat #12 ==
Seat created by decree on 18 June 1946 and suppressed by decree on 28 November 1956.

- 1947: François Debat (1882–1956)

== Seat #13 ==
Seat created by decree on 8 June 1998

- 2000: François-Bernard Michel (born 1936)

== Sources ==
- List of members @ the Académie des Beaux-Arts website.

== See also ==
- List of Académie des Beaux-Arts members: Painting
- List of Académie des Beaux-Arts members: Sculpture
- List of Académie des Beaux-Arts members: Architecture
- List of Académie des Beaux-Arts members: Engraving
- List of Académie des Beaux-Arts members: Music
- List of Académie des Beaux-Arts members: Cinema
