= List of works by Jean Antoine Injalbert =

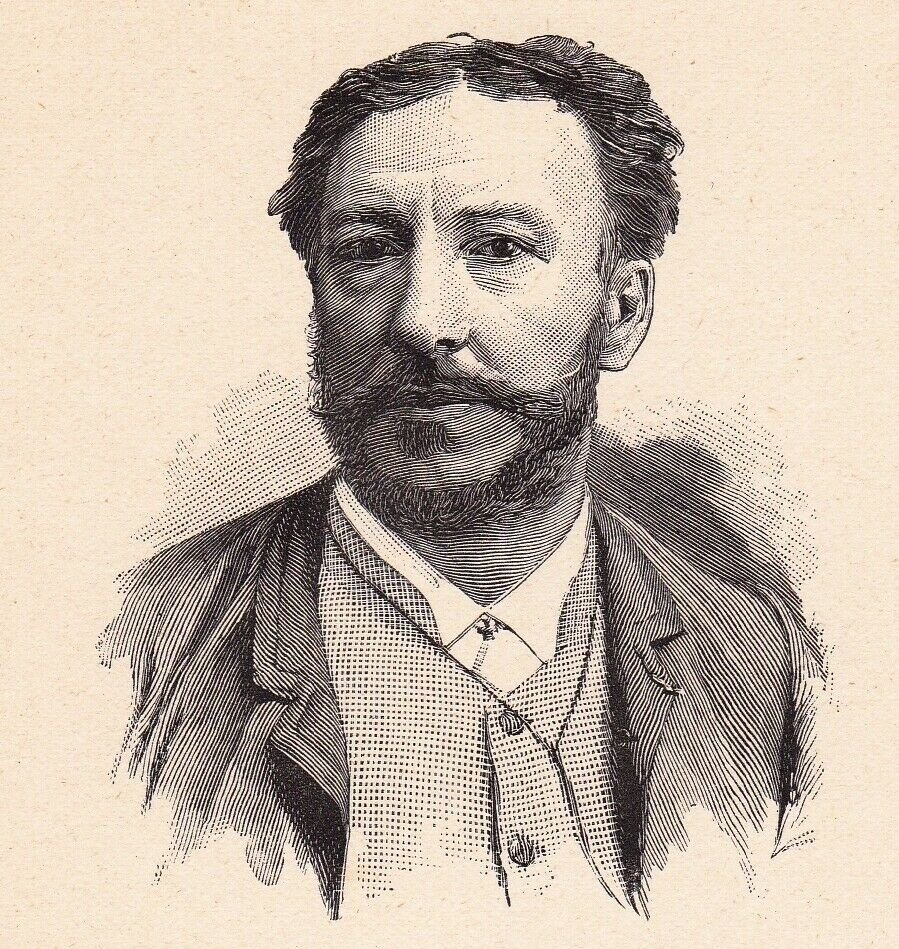
Jean Antoine Injalbert

Jean Antoine Injalbert was born in Béziers in 1845 and died in 1933. He was one of France's greatest sculptors. He worked in many of the great towns and cities of France and examples of his work can be seen in Paris, Pézenas, Reims, Montpellier, Sète etc. The son of a stonemason, Injalbert first served an apprenticeship with an ornamental sculptor, then entered the École des Beaux-Arts in Paris in 1866 with a municipal scholarship. His teacher was Augustin-Alexandre Dumont. In 1874 he won the Prix de Rome with a figure of Orpheus, and at the Éxposition of 1889 he won the Grand Prix. His first commission was to create the tympanum for La Chapelle du Bon Pasteur in Béziers.

== List of works. "Marianne" and some Injalbert public works in Paris ==
Name	Location	Notes
Busts of "Marianne"	Various-see notes	There must be dozens of Injalbert's busts of "Marianne", whether in plaster, marble or bronze, scattered throughout France. A "Marianne" bust is almost obligatory for French hôtel de villes/mairies and many of these would be by Injalbert, particularly based on his 1889 model which he had executed to celebrate the centenary of the French Revolution and this has been replicated many times and cast in bronze by many foundries including Soit-Decauville. They are always given pride of place and are often decked with the tricolour. Whilst in most instances the work is called "Marianne", it can also be known as "La République". A bust of "Marianne" was also favoured as a centre-piece for public fountains and Injalbert's model is often used, mostly in bronze, which is more suitable in a water environment. However many of the public fountain busts were requisitioned by the Germans during their occupation, or by the Vichy regime The busts were melted down so that the metal could be reused in the manufacture of armaments. Given the volume involved it would not therefore seem appropriate to itemize all the locations of Injalbert's "Marianne", whether in town halls and mairies or used on public fountains. As stated many public water fountains had Injalbert "Marianne" busts incorporated into their design. For example, in Villemagne in the Aude there is an Injalbert bronze bust of "Marianne" decorating the fountain which was a gift from Monsieur Dujardin Beaumetz. "Marianne" wears a Phrygian bonnet and a stole with a brooch depicting a lion's head. This is a version of the 1889 "Marianne" this time cast in bronze by J.Malesset in 1908. Then in Trassanel in the Aude, there is another fountain which featured Injalbert's "Marianne". It was erected in 1927 but the bronze content was requisitioned during the occupation and melted down. The same applies to the public fountain in Paulhan in Hérault. Jean Antoine Injalbert's 1889 bust of "Marianne" often called "La République"
The Pont de Bir-Hakeim	Paris	The Pont de Bir-Hakeim is a bridge that crosses the Seine River in Paris. It connects the city's 15th and 16th arrondissements, Originally named the Viaduc de Passy, Passy being the suburb to which the bridge runs. The bridge was renamed in 1948 to commemorate the Battle of Bir Hakeim, fought by Free French forces against the German Afrika Korps in 1942. This Paris bridge has two sculptures by Injalbert one representing "Commerce" and the other "Electricity".
Pont Mirabeau	Paris	Injalbert was responsible for the four allegorical statues which decorate the Pont Mirabeau bridge in Paris. These are entitled "The City of Paris", "Navigation", "Abundance" and "Commerce". The statues "The City of Paris" and "Abundance" face the Seine, while the two allegories "Navigation" and "Commerce" face the bridge. The four statues are surmounted, at the level of the parapet, by the coat of arms of the City of Paris. The work dates to 1896. The sculpture "Abundance" by Injalbert on the Pont Mirabeau in Paris
Statue of Mirabeau in the Panthéon	Paris	The Panthéon had started out as a church. King Louis XV had vowed in 1744 that if he recovered from his illness he would replace the ruined church of the Abbey of St Genevieve with an edifice worthy of the patron saint of Paris. He did recover, and instructed Abel-François Poisson, marquis de Marigny to see that his promise was fulfilled. In 1755, Marigny commissioned Jacques-Germain Soufflot to design the church, and construction started two years later. The remodelled Abbey of St. Genevieve was finally completed in 1790, coinciding with the early stages of the French Revolution. Upon the death of the popular French orator and statesman Honoré Gabriel Riqueti, comte de Mirabeau on 2 April 1791, the National Constituent Assembly, whose president had been Mirabeau, ordered that the building be changed from a church to a mausoleum for the interment of great Frenchmen, retaining Quatremère de Quincy to oversee the project. Mirabeau was the first person interred there on 4 April 1791. However, in 1792 his secret dealings with the king were uncovered, and in 1794 his remains were removed from the Panthéon and were replaced with those of Marat. Mirabeau's remains were then buried anonymously. Injalbert was commissioned to create a statue in honour of Mirabeau and this is still in the Panthéon. Mirabeau is shown making a speech. Mirabeau's statue in the Panthéon
Hippomane/ Hippomène	Paris	Injalbert created this composition in 1886 and it is a work that is much reproduced and in various materials. A copy of the work can be found in the Jardin du Luxembourg in Paris. Hippomène was the husband of Atalanta in Greek mythology. He is usually depicted running, reminding one of Hippomane's running race to secure Atalanta's hand in marriage, which he won, albeit by cheating.
The Louis Gabriel Charles Vicaire monument	Paris	Louis Gabriel Charles Vicaire (January 25, 1848 – September 23, 1900) was a French poet. He was born at Belfort and served in the campaign of 1870. He then settled in Paris to practice at the bar, which, however, he soon abandoned for literature. This work by Injalbert is in the Jardin du Luxembourg in Paris. Gabriel Vicaire by Injalbert
The tympanum of the Petit Palais	Paris	The Petit Palais in Paris was built for the Éxposition Universelle in 1900 and now houses the City of Paris Museum of Fine Arts (musée des beaux-arts de la ville de Paris). Injalbert executed the relief carving on the tympanum which depicts the city of Paris surrounded and inspired by various muses.
Monument to Auguste Comte	Paris	This statue, honouring the French philosopher Auguste Comte, is located in the Place de la Sorbonne in Paris and was inaugurated in 1902. In the centre of Injalbert's composition is a bust of Auguste Comte and to the left is Clotilde de Vaux depicted as a "Madonna with Child" whilst on the right the "proletariat" give de Vaux instructions. Auguste Comte by Injalbert. Place de la Sorbonne
Gobelins Factory in 42 av des Gobelins Paris	Paris	It was in 1912 that this building was erected, designed by Jean-Camille Formigé. The Gobelins tapestry manufacture was one of France's oldest and most prestigious enterprises. Some of the earlier buildings had been destroyed by fire in 1871 or fallen into general disrepair, so Formigé was asked to design a new building . He decorated the front of the building with four columns each surmounted by a caryatid and commissioned Injalbert to sculpt them and Paul Landowski was commissioned to carve a bas-relief. Today the Gobelins premises consist of four irregular buildings dating to the seventeenth century, plus the building on the avenue des Gobelins built by Formigé. These buildings contain Charles Le Brun's residence and workshops that served as foundries for most of the bronze statues in the park of Versailles, as well as looms on which tapestries are still woven following seventeenth century techniques. The Gobelins factory still produces a limited amount of tapestries for the decoration of French governmental institutions these with contemporary subjects. Formigé's Gobelins building in Paris. Injalbert's 4 caryatides can be seen as well as Landowski's bas-relief
Cercle national des armées, a.k.a. Cercle militaire interarmes	Paris	This important Army headquarters is situated in Paris. It was built in 1927 on the site of former barracks and designed by architect Charles Lemaresquier. It is decorated with sculptures by Jean-Antoine Injalbert, François-Léon Sicard, Jean Boucher and Paul Landowski.

== Works by Injalbert in the Musée d'Orsay ==
This museum/art gallery has many works by Injalbert These include-

- "Ariane couchée"
- "Bacchante au Biniou"
- "Baigneuse"
- "Baiser"
- "Confidence"
- "Enfant"
- "Fondeur"
- "L'Hérault"
- "Satyre assis et Nymphe".
- "Satyre et Nymphe".
- "Satyre poursuivant une Nymphe".
- "Sibylle de Panzoult".
- "Supplication d'aprés Aubanel".
- "Triomphe de la République".
- "Vase orné de mascarons, de nymphes et de satyres".
- "Maitre Vigeant".
- "Poemes Idylliques Paiens".

== Works by Injalbert in the Louvre ==
Name	Location	Notes
Works by Injalbert in the Louvre	Paris	* "Statue d'une femme nue, assise, sur un socle" in held in the musée du Louvre département des Arts graphiques.: "Jules Eugene Lenepveu" is held in Angers; musée des beaux-arts.; "Victor Hugo". Blois; musée du château de Blois; "L'Amour dompte la Force" Nantes; musée des beaux-arts; "La République" Bourbon-Lancy; musée Saint-Nazaire; "Ermengaud" in Lyon; musée des beaux-arts.; "Jeune Femme assise au Tambourin" in Toulouse; musée des Augustins.; "La Republique" in Rennes; musée des beaux-arts.; "La Republique" in Pau; musée national du château de Pau

== Injalbert public works in Béziers' Plateau des Poètes ==
Name	Location	Notes
The “Plateau des Poètes”	Béziers	The “Plateau des Poètes" involves fifty thousand square meters of parkland that join the lower end of the “Allées Paul Riquet” with the railway station. This garden, designed by the Swiss born architects the Bühler brothers, contains many examples of Injalbert's work, all of which can be seen and admired in an idyllic setting of exotic trees and shrubs. In the park are several busts of Languedoc poets by Injalbert, hence the name Plateau des Poètes. There is also the massive war memorial located at the lower end of the gardens and opposite the Béziers railway station. Details of this are given in the section covering "War memorials". Also in the park is the Titan fountain with its statue of Atlas and a lake containing Injalbert's "Enfant au poisson"
Bust of Matfre Ermengaud	Béziers	One of the busts in the plateau des poètes' garden is of Matfre Ermengaud who died in 1322 and was a Franciscan friar and troubadour. The bust is in marble and rests on a stone pedestal. The inscription reads "LE MOINE MATFRE ERMENGAUD AUTEUR DU BREVARI D'AMOR 1288". Injalbert executed the plaster model in February/March 1902 and completed the marble version in July of that year. He offered the work as a gift to the town and the inauguration took place on the 18 August 1902 at the same time as the busts of Hugo, Rosier and Viennet were unveiled.
Bust of Benjamin Fabre	Béziers	Another bust in the plateau des poètes' garden is that of the poet Benjamin Fabre. The inscription reads "BENJAMIN FABRE POETE LANGUEDOCIEN BITERROIS 1832–1911" Injalbert executed this bust in 1921, based on a plaster model which he sculpted in 1876. This plaster model is held by the musée de Béziers . Inauguration took place on 7 October 1923. Fabre had been a childhood friend of Injalbert.
Bust of Jean Bernard Rosier	Béziers	Another bust in the plateau des poètes' garden is that of the writer Jean Bernard Rosier. The pedestal is inscribed "Rosier auteur dramatique 1798 -1888".
Bust of Jean-Pons-Guillaume Viennet	Béziers	Another of those remembered is Jean-Pons-Guillaume Viennet. The inscription reads "J P G VIENNET PAIR DE FRANCE MEMBRE DE L'ACADEMIE FRANÇAISE 1777–1868" The bust was based on a model made in 1884. Viennet was a politician and academic.
Bust of Victor Hugo	Béziers	Another bust is of that of Victor Hugo. Unfortunately Injalbert's 1902 work was destroyed and Jean Magrou executed a replacement.
Bust of Gabriel Azais	Béziers	In the plateau des poètes' garden there is also an Injalbert marble bust of Gabriel Azais dating to 1904. The pedestal is inscribed "GABRIEL AZAIS POETE LANGUEDOCIEN AUTEUR DU DICTIONNAIRE DES IDIOMES ROMANS DU MIDI DE LA FRANCE 1805–1888".
The Titan Fountain in the garden of the Plateau des Poètes in Béziers	Béziers	Injalbert executed an elaborate marble grouping for this fountain with a bronze depiction of Titan at the top. There are also caryatides in marble in the fountain's lower basin. In the marble grouping Atlas carries a globe and a large mask of a faune is surrounded by sea horses and small children. The statue of Titan was executed in 1877, exhibited in Rome and Paris in 1879, then reworked for the 1883 Salon. It was then purchased by the State and cast in bronze, the bronze version being shown at the 1884 exhibition. A maquette of the entire fountain was presented in 1885 and finally the fountain was inaugurated on 14 July 1893. Fontaine du Titan, Béziers, Plateau des Poètes. Jean Antoine Injalbert's Titan Fountain. Photograph courtesy Annie in Béziers
L'enfant au poisson	Béziers	Also in the plateau des poètes is a smaller fountain dating to 1898 with Injalbert's composition featuring a child holding a fish. This composition had been shown at the Salon in 1891 and was installed on the fountain in 1893. There are a number of copies in circulation featuring just the child's head including one in marble in the musée d'Orsay.

== Works in Béziers' Cimetière Vieux/The "Old" Cemetery ==
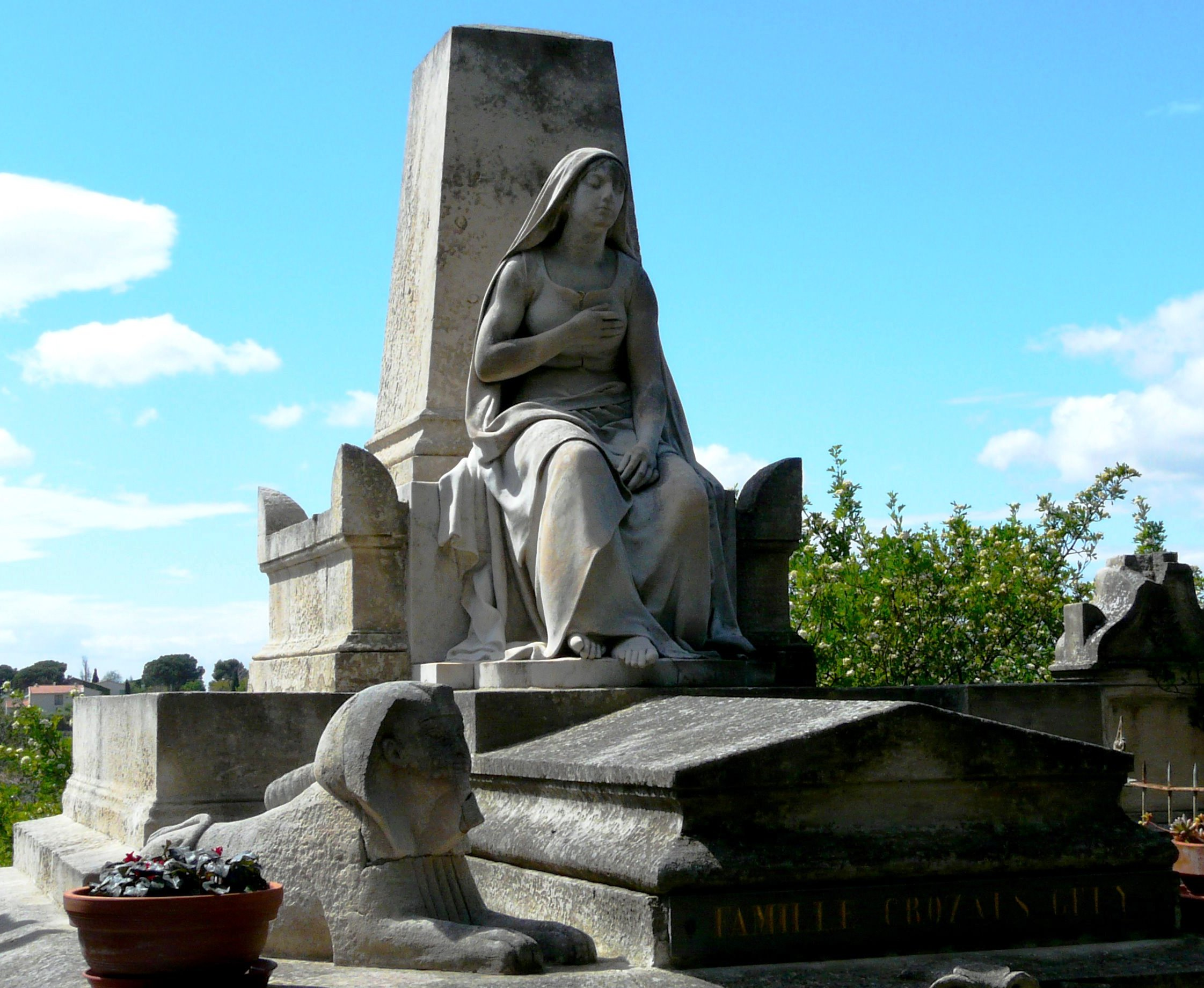
Tomb in Béziers Old Cemetery. Photograph courtesy Brigitte Hamey

Many families in Béziers made good fortunes from the region's wine trade and were able to afford commissioning some of the day's top sculptors to work on their family tombs.

Name	Location	Notes
Tomb of the Injalbert family	Béziers' Cimetière Vieux	The Injalbert family grave is located in Béziers old cemetery. The basic tomb was created in 1896 the year after his father's death. Injalbert added a bas- relief in 1897 and the statue of a grieving woman was added in 1902. In that year a plaster model of this statue was shown at the Paris Salon. Medallions were added in 1915. See Brigitte Hamey's photograph here and that in the "Gallery" being a close-up of the grieving woman, also shown courtesy Brigitte Hamey. The tomb of Jean Antoine Injalbert. Photograph shown courtesy Brigitte Hamey
Tomb of Clauzel Milhau family	Béziers' Cimetière Vieux	Another tomb in the cimetière vieux in Béziers is that for the Clauzel Milhau family. It has a marble statue by Injalbert. This work dates to 1889 and was shown in 1891 to the Salon de la société nationale des beaux-arts. In Injalbert's composition he shows a grieving woman standing bare foot by the trunk of a tree.
Tomb of Azais Hot family	Béziers' Cimetière Vieux	For this tomb Injalbert executed a bas-relief for the door to the small funeral chapel which was then cast in bronze by the Andro foundry. The work was executed in 1921.
Tomb of Chappaz family	Béziers' Cimetière Vieux	Here Injalbert executed a bas-relief featuring a "pleureuse" or grieving woman. The work dates to 1897. Bas-relief on the tomb.
Tomb of Fabre Gourguet family	Béziers' Cimetière Vieux	Injalbert carried out work for this tomb which comprised a marble statue of a woman holding a crown of flowers.
Tomb of the Auguste Fabregat family	Béziers' Cimetière Vieux	For Auguste Fabregat's family grave, Injalbert executed a bronze bust of Fabregat with the inscription "À LA MEMOIRE DE MR FABREGAT AUGUSTE AVOCAT ANCIEN MAIRE DE BEZIERS 1804–1879" This replicated a marble bust which Injalbert had created in Rome in 1879 and which is now held by the musée de Béziers. The tomb of Fabregat, topped by the bust sculpted by Injalbert.
Tomb of the Gleizes Péril family	Béziers' Cimetière Vieux	Here Injalbert executed a statue of a woman carrying flowers. This work was called "La Grande Égalitaire" when first conceived in 1912 and was used in 1919 for the Cabrières war memorial.
Tomb of Léonie et Héloïse Négrie	Béziers' Cimetière Vieux	Injalbert's 1922 composition for the Négrie tomb involves a "pleureuse" who leans against a rock.
Tomb of Ribo Meron family	Béziers' Cimetière Vieux	The tomb of the Ribo Meron family comprises a mausoleum with ornate columns and Injalbert's high-relief in marble dating to 1897. The tomb of Joseph Ribo-Méron.
Tomb of Tisseyre Guyonnet	Béziers' Cimetière Vieux	For this tomb, Injalbert executed a figure of Christ on the cross which was cast in bronze by Valsuani. The work dates to 1915. The plaster version of the figure was shown at the Paris Salon of 1878 and won the "médaille d'or". A bronze version was shown at the Salon in 1881 and the "Éxposition universelle" in 1889. There is another copy of the work in the église Saint-Aphrodise in Béziers. There is also a depiction of Christ on the mausoleum's brass door knob and this dates to 1913.

== Other works in Béziers ==
Name	Location	Notes
Bust of Camille Saint-Saëns	Béziers	Injalbert executed a bust of this composer in 1910.
Hotel Chappaz	Béziers	This building in Béziers is now much neglected but Injalbert's sculptures are still intact and are arguably some of his best work. It was Joseph Chappaz, a wine merchant who specialized in vermouths such as Noilly-Prat who had the building built in 1868 for his wife Augustine and he commissioned Injalbert to execute the caryatides on the front of the building. The building is no longer occupied and has fallen into disrepair but hopefully the Béziers authorities will make sure that Injalbert's work survives.
Hotel La Villa Guy	Béziers	There's a high-relief of a faune head and a small child touching it in the hotel's garden. At the base it reads FABER EST SUÆ QUISQUE FORTUNÆ; OPUS ANTONINI INJALBERT ANNO MCMXXI
Works in Villa Antonine	Béziers	The Villa Antonine was Injalbert's summer residence and many of his sculptures can be seen in the Villa's gardens. After his death Injalbert's widow left the house and many of its sculptures to the city of Béziers. Injalbert work in Villa Antonine. Photograph courtesy Annie in Béziers
Works in Hôtel Gustav Fayet	Béziers	The Hôtel Gustav Fayet in Béziers also holds several works by Injalbert which are on public display.
Bust of Casimir Peret	Béziers	The bust of Casimir Peret sits on a tall column in the Place de la Revolution. It was unveiled on 24 March 1907. There is an inscription at the base of the column which reads "In this square on the third of December 1851 the army fired upon the Republican Demonstrators, who, encouraged by the Mayor, Casimir Peret, were against the coup d'État by Napoleon III" The suppression of this protest movement resulted in certain persons being condemned to death and others deported to French Guiana. Casimir Peret, who had been sent to Cayenne perished at sea during an escape attempt from that isle.
"Bacchante au biniou"	Béziers	This 1897 work is located in Béziers' place des Bons Amis. It depicts a woman playing the bagpipes. The work was shown at the Paris Salon in 1897 and then installed in the Injalbert garden in Béziers. In 1978 it was placed in the place des Bons Amis.
The Musée des beaux-arts.	Béziers	Injalbert's widow donated several of his works to the museum. The museum is housed in the Hôtel Fabrégat which had been the private residence of lawyer, historian and ex-mayor, Auguste Fabrégat, who left it to the town to house the collections of the Béziers Archeological Society. Some of the works held by the Musée are-: Malaria. 1878.; Enfant au masque.1880.; Enfant martyr. 1880.; Chanteur napolitain. 1880; La Charité. 1890.; Abondance. 1992.; Fauve ivre. 1904.; Satyre assis jouant de la flûte. Statuette. 1905.; Fauve ivre. Mairie de Béziers. 1909.; Femme à la puce.1909.; Sybille de Panzout.1910.; Femme nue debout. 1910.; Victor Hugo aux Feuillantines.1912.; Nymphe lutinant un satyre assis.1913.; De Profondis.1915.; Enfant au chapeau.1915.; Femme assise sur un rocher.1917.; Isabelle. 1927.; Femme assise mettant son bas.

== Injalbert works in Montpellier ==
Name	Location	Notes
Prefecture of Hérault in Montpellier	Montpellier	There is a sculpture by Injalbert on the front of the prefecture and some sculptures in the vestibule.. Hérault is one of the original 83 departments created during the French Revolution on 4 March 1790. It was created from part of the former province of Languedoc.
Triptych in the Montpellier Bibliothèque	Montpellier	This was the old collège des Jésuites. The triptych caused something of a scandal when first shown in 1895 and was judged to be indecent. It was installed at the Bibliothèque in 1965. Prior to this it was installed at the Comédie theatre in Montpellier and had been shown at the Salon in 1894. It was entitled "La Poésie de l'Amour dans la passion et la mélancolie".
Works held in the Injalbert Gallery in the Musée Farbe in Montpellie	Montpellier	The Musée Farbe in Montpellier has a bust by Injalbert of Cardinal de Cabrières.
Bust of Monseigneur de Cabrières	Montpellier	This marble bust, dating to 1914, is located in 22 rue Lallemand in Montpellier. The inscription reads " A.Injalbert sculpsit Anno MCMXIIII; Au / Cardinal de Cabrières / hommage de l'Ecole / de la Trinité. / Béziers" François Marie Anatole de Rovierié de Cabrières was the Bishop of Montpellier from 1874 to 1921.
Statues of lions and cherubs in Montpellier	Montpellier	injalbert created sculptures of lions and cherubs for statues in Montpellier's promenade du Peyrou. These were carved from Echaillon stone. Injalbert's theme was " La force domptée par l'amour". The statues were inaugurated in April 1884.
Façade of the Opéra Comédie in Montpellier	Montpellier	Injalbert completed four statues for this theatre depicting "Le Chant", "La Poésie", "La Tragédie" and "La Comédie"
"Douleur d'Orphée". Injalbert's Prix de Rome winning entry of 1874		This was the 1874 composition with which Injalbert won the Prix de Rome of that year. It is held in the collection of the musée d'Orsay. Bronze castings were made in 1907 and in 1925 by the foundry Frédéric Carvillani.

== Other works outside of Béziers, Montpellier and Paris ==
Name	Location	Notes
Théâtre Molière	Sète	Injalbert executed some sculpture for the front of Sète's Théâtre Molière.
Statue of a nymph	Épinay-sur-Seine	In the Mairie of Épinay-sur-Seine there is a statuette in white marble by Injalbert.
The town hall in Riom in the Puy-de-Dôme	Riom	In Riom in the Puy-de-Dôme the hôtel de ville has some sculptural work by Injalbert.
Vase decorated with nymphs and satyrs	Ivry-sur-Seine	This vase is located in the Hôtel de ville of Ivry-sur-Seine. It is elaborately decorated with nymphs and satyrs. Dated 1897, it is a shared work, Injalbert working with Emile Muller. The musée d'Orsay has an identical work which they list as "vase orné de mascarons, de nymphes et de satyres". This is in marble and was shown at the Paris Salon in 1905.
Statue of Louis Gallet	Valence	It was in 1901 that this Injalbert statue was unveiled in the presence of the composer Camille Saint-Saëns. Having suffered from various acts of vandalism, the statue was moved to its current location in the Jouvet public park. Statue of Louis Gallet
The "Félibres célèbres"	Sceaux	In the Square des Félibres, 49 avenue du Président Franklin Roosevelt in Sceaux are 9 busts of the Félibres. The first bust is of Florian by the sculptor Jacques Auguste Fauginet, the second is of Théodore Aubanel by sculptor Frédéric Etienne Leroux. The third bust is of Clovis Hugues by his wife Jeanne Royannez and the fourth is of Paul Arène sculpted by Benoît Lucien Hercule. The fifth bust depicts Sextius Michel and is by Jean-Pierre Gras whilst the sixth is of Delmuns Montaud and is by Injalbert. The seventh bust is of Frédéric Mistral and thought to be by Félix Charpentier, the eighth is of Paul Marieton sculpted by Henri Léon Greber and the ninth is of Maurice Faure and sculpted by Jean-Pierre Gras.
Bust of Gustave Larroumet	Cahors	This terracotta work of 1889 is part of the collection of the musée de Cahors Henri-Martin in Cahors. Louis Barthélemy Gustave Paul Larroumet was a French art historian and writer with strong links to Cahors.
Monument Pierre Puget	Toulon	Injalbert executed the sculptural work for this commemorative monument dedicated to the sculptor Pierre Puget. The monument's inauguration took place in 1900 although the bust involved dates to 1891. It is located in Toulon's garden Alexandre Ier in the boulevard Général Leclerc. Puget was born in Marseille and Mont Puget, one of the mountain ranges bordering Marseille, is named after him.
Buste de Marius Estellon	Lorgues	Buste de Marius ESTELLON ( Lorgues 1848 - 1907 ) Buste de Marius ESTELLON ( Lorgues 1848 - 1907 ) Ce buste en bronze de 80 cm de haut représente Marius ESTELLON notable de Lorgues (Var) et bienfaiteur de l’hospice de cette ville. C’était le beau frère de Joseph Chappaz, industriel de Béziers pour qui Injalbert a réalisé la statuaire décorant la maison (Maison Chappaz à Béziers achetée par la ville en 2018) et les sculptures du tombeau de famille (Cimetière Vieux à Béziers). Ce buste est dédicacé : « A l’ami Marius. Injalbert 1889. Il se trouve à l’EHPAD municipal St-François de Lorgues.
Bust of Jules Eugène Lenepveu	Angers	This artist is buried in Angers's cemetery and Injalbert executed a marble bust for his grave. Lenepveu became famous for his vast historical canvases, including the ceilings of the Opéra de Paris and of the theatre at Angers (1871). He was director of the French Academy in Rome from 1873 to 1878.
High-relief on the exterior of 26 rue Camille Groult	Vitry-sur-Seine	This composition by Injalbert depicts a small child who hands are placed on the face of a faune. In this work, Injalbert worked with Emile Muller a ceramicist. 26 rue Camille Groult is known as the "maison aux lions".
Monument celebrating Comedy	Orange	This monument with sculpture by Injalbert is located in the place de la République in Orange. The theme of Injalbert's composition is "L'âme antique remettant le flambeau de l'art au génie moderne" (the spirit of antiquity re-igniting the flame of modern art.)
Monument to Professor Joseph Marie Eugène Grasset	Lamalou-les-Bains	This monument is located in the Square Grasset of Lamalou-les-Bains in Hérault and consists of an Injalbert bust of Professor Grasset. The monument is inscribed "AU PROFESSEUR GRASSET DE L'UNIVERSITE DE MONTPELLIER BIENFAITEUR DE LA STATION THERMALE DE LAMALOU" The monument was erected in 1924. Grasset was a doctor and philosopher.
Statues in Tours		Injalbert created allegorical statues representing Bordeaux and Toulouse for Tours' railway station and of the rivers Loire and Cher for the Tours' hôtel de ville. The railway station was built from 1896 to 1898, the architect being Victor Laloux. Laloux was to build the Orsay railway station two years later. The station's façade has Injalbert's statues of Bordeaux and Toulouse and the sculptor Jean Hugues added allegorical statues depicting Limoges and Nantes. In the hôtel de ville there are two busts executed for the fireplace of the "Salle des Fêtes". One of these is a "Marianne" by Laurent Daragon this based on Injalbert's model.
Monument to Molière in Pézenas		This statue by Injalbert is located in Pézenas in the Hérault. In Injalbert's composition a female figure represents "Comedy" whilst a satyr represents "Satire", the group being completed by a bust of Molière himself and masks representing Coquelin Cadet and Jeanne Ludwig, both members of the comédie française. The monument is inscribed "À MOLIERE SES ADMIRATEURS" The monument was inaugurated on 8 August 1897. Molière was born Jean-Baptiste Poquelin, (1622–1673), and rated by many critics as the greatest comic dramatist of all times and considered worthy to stand with Sophocles and Shakespeare. It was here in Pézenas that he took the name Molière when he was elected leader of his troop of actors after the original manager debunked with the troop's funds.

== Works held in Copenhagen's Ny Carlsberg Glyptotek ==
Name	Location	Notes
Drunken Faun	Copenhagen	A version of this work by Injalbert is located in the Ny Carlsberg Glyptotek in Copenhagen.
Satyr and Nymph	Copenhagen	A terracotta version of this work is located in the Ny Carlsberg Glyptotek in Copenhagen.Denmark.

== War memorial ==
Name	Location	Notes
War memorial of Cabrières in the Gard		For this war memorial Injalbert sculpted the figure of a woman in mourning. She holds a Phylactery a symbol of grief. The inauguration took place in October 1921. A plaster maquette of this work can be seen in the Bezièrs museum. 8 men from Cabrières lost their lives in the 1914–1918 war.
War memorial of Cournonterral in Hérault		This war memorial depicts an allegory of France who holds a crown of laurels in one hand whilst in the other she holds a sword whose point has pierced a German helmet. The memorial was inaugurated 29 July 1923. 73 men of Cournonterral lost their lives in the two World Wars the bulk of them in The Great War.
The war memorial of Lamalou-les-Bains in Hérault		Located in the square Cauvy in Lamalou-les-Bains this war memorial features a sculpture by Injalbert. It comprises a bronze high-relief depiction of "Victory" who holds a crown of laurels and a palm. The memorial was inaugurated on 12 June 1921. The relief was cast by Andro and the relief is the same as that used for the "Collège de la Trinité" memorial in Béziers. 32 men of Lamalou-les-Bains died in the two wars.
The war memorial of Paulhan		This memorial is located in Paulhan's Place du 8 mai 1945 and has a bronze depicting a woman who represents Paulhan and offers a crown to the victors. The inscription reads "A SES HEROS LA CITE RECONNAISSANTE 1914–1918". The casting was done by Valsuani. 66 victims of the war are honoured and their names listed.
The war memorial of Boujan-sur-Libron		The Boujan-sur-Libron war memorial in the place de l'Église has a bas-relief in bronze by Injalbert. A winged "Angel of Victory" offers a cup to a soldier and above them and on a pedestal is a Gallic rooster. The bas-relief was executed in 1921 a year before its use at Boujan-sur-Libron. The model for the soldier was used again as part of the Béziers war memorial on the plateau des Poètes.
War memorial at Laurens in Hérault		This war memorial has a marble work by Injalbert which comprises a crowing rooster, symbolizing France, with a German "pickelhauber" helmet at its feet. The monument was erected in 1920 and bears the inscription " RF ENFANTS N'OUBLIEZ PAS C'EST POUR VOUS QU'ILS SONT MORTS 1914 1918 RF" This is followed by the names of those remembered. The plaster model had been created by Injalbert in 1919 and was held in Béziers' museum and Injalbert donated a marble version to Laurens as he often purchased his marble from the local quarries.
The war memorial of Béziers		At the end of 1918 the then mayor of Béziers, Jules Manquié, proposed that a war memorial be erected and a committee was organized, chaired by a Colonel Mirepoix, to organize it. A subscription to cover the costs was organized and Injalbert was chosen to carry out the sculptural work involved and the garden of the Plateau des Poètes was chosen as the site for the memorial. The memorial is an elaborate one and is inscribed "A NOS MORTS GLORIEUX / A TOUS LES ARTISANS DE LA / VICTOIRE / LA VILLE DE BEZIERS RECONNAISSANTE". The memorial is carved from the white stone of Estaillades. Injalbert's composition for the memorial comprises a bronze "Angel of Victory" at the summit with groups placed around it. A soldier lies by one group, one suspects mortally wounded, whilst two women stand together overcome with grief and are embraced by a figure representing France. Elsewhere another soldier stands defiantly with his foot on a German Imperial eagle.
Monument to the République	Belvèze-du-Razès	This monument in the avenue de l'Hôtel-de-Ville has a bronze bust of Marianne as its centre-piece

== Gallery ==
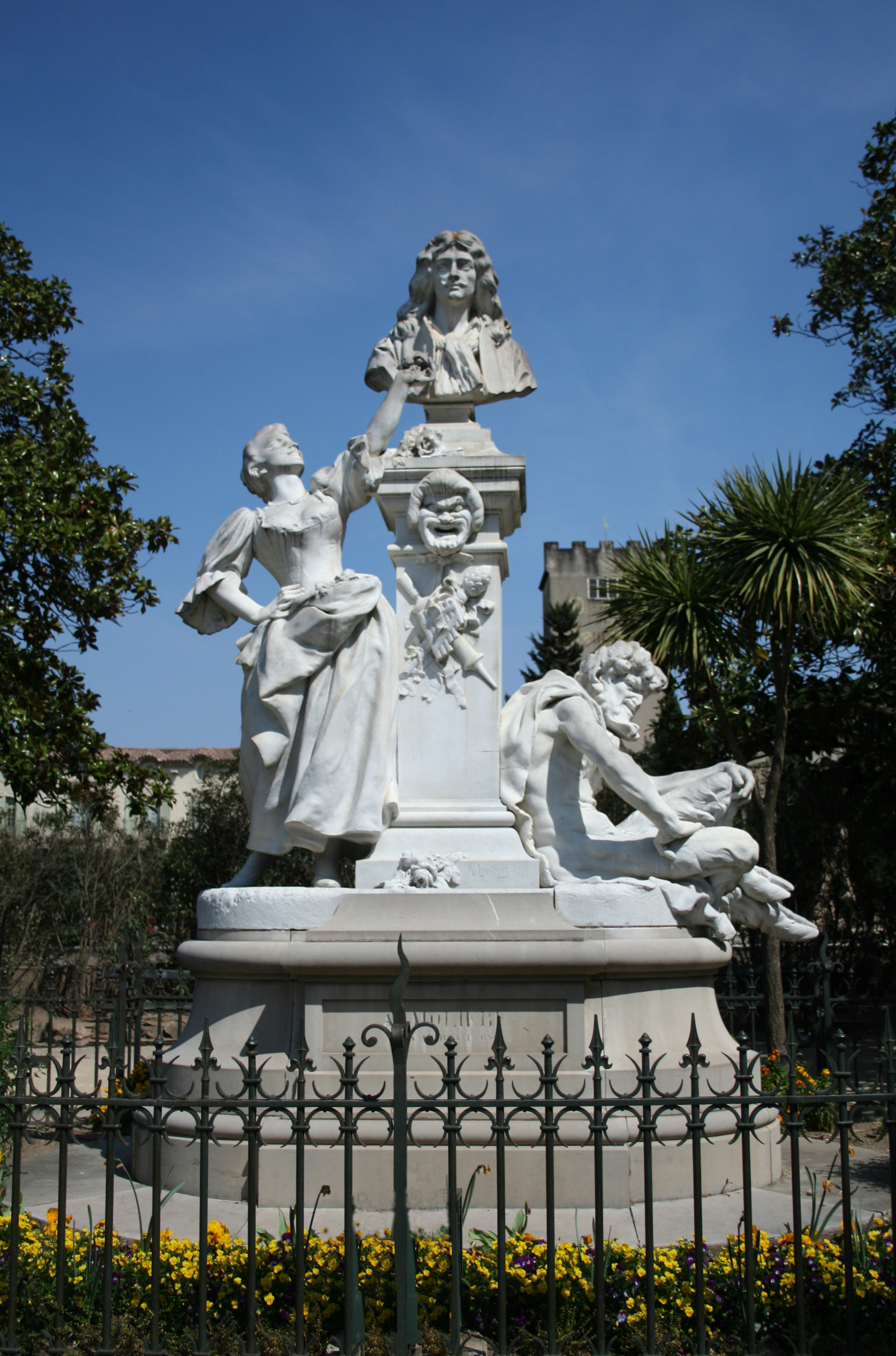
Monument to Molière at Pézenas

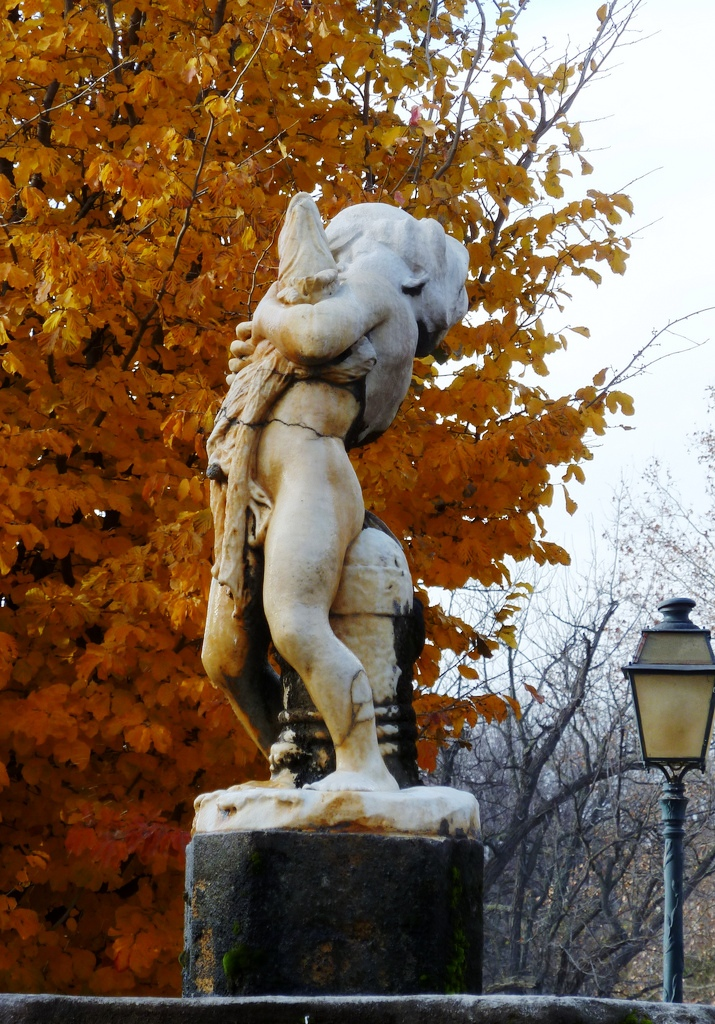
Injalbert's "Enfant aux poisson". Photograph courtesy Linda W (tobysmum)

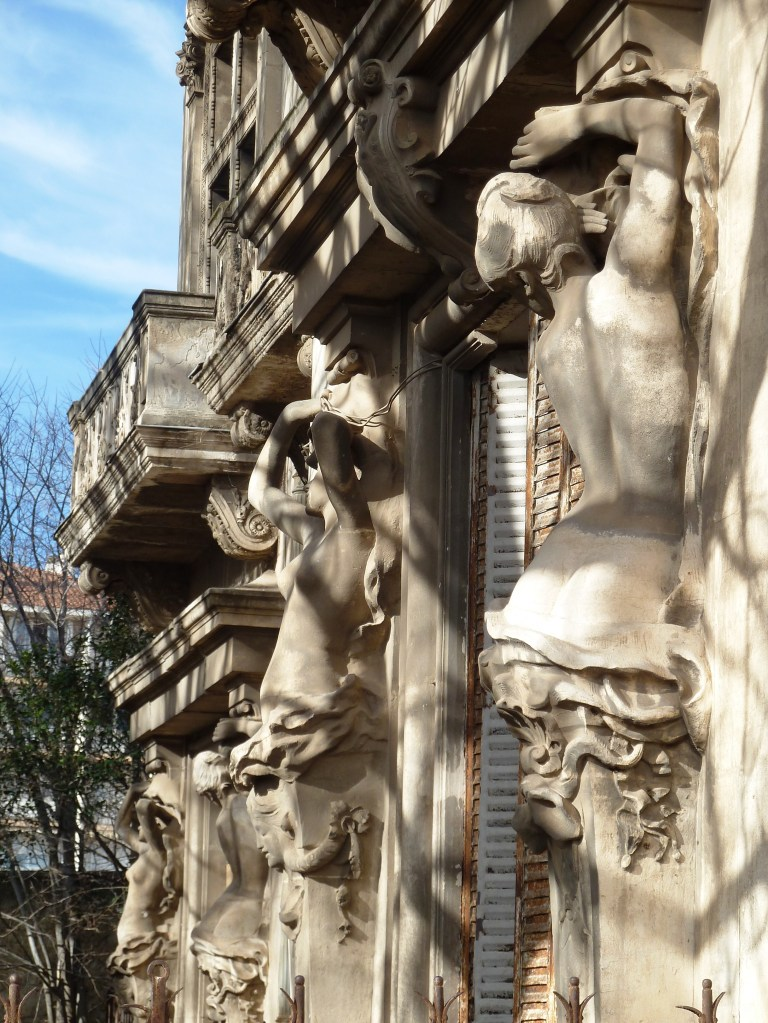
Injalbert sculpture on front of Hotel Chappaz in Béziers. Photograph courtesy Linda W (tobysmum)

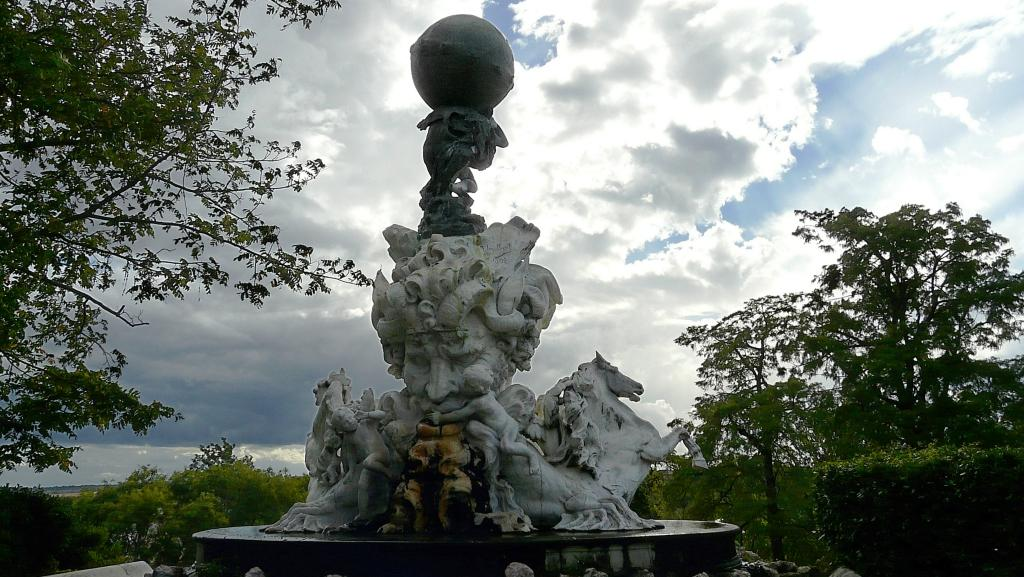
Titan Fountain by Injalbert. Photograph courtesy Brigitte Hamey.

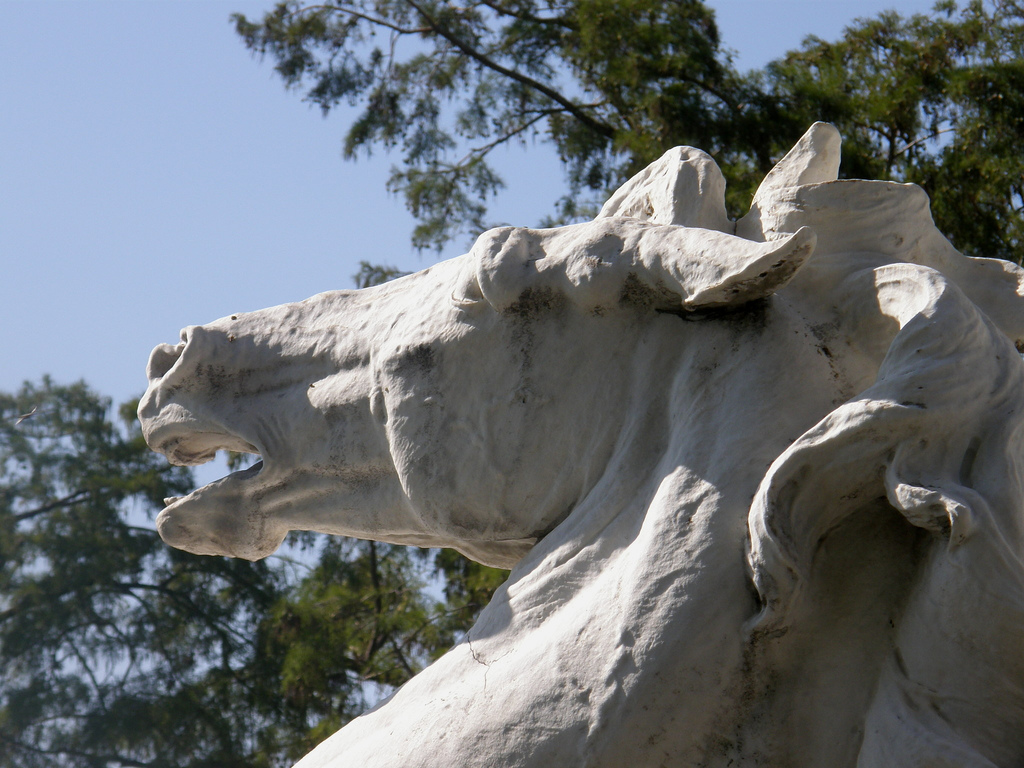
Close-up Titan Fountain.Photograph courtesy Annie in Béziers

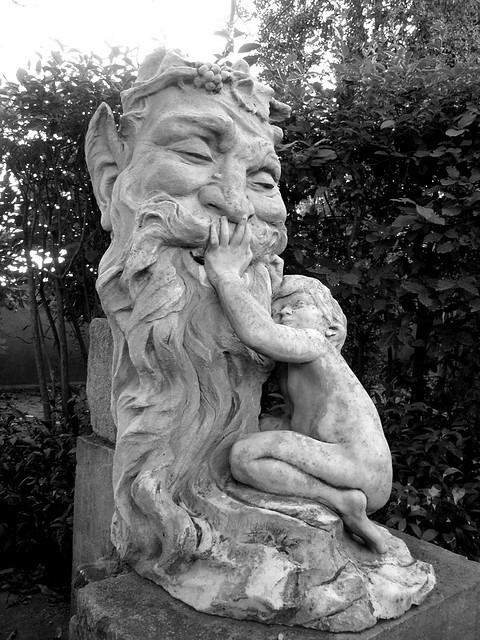
Injalbert's sculpture in Villa Antonine. Photograph courtesy Annie in Béziers

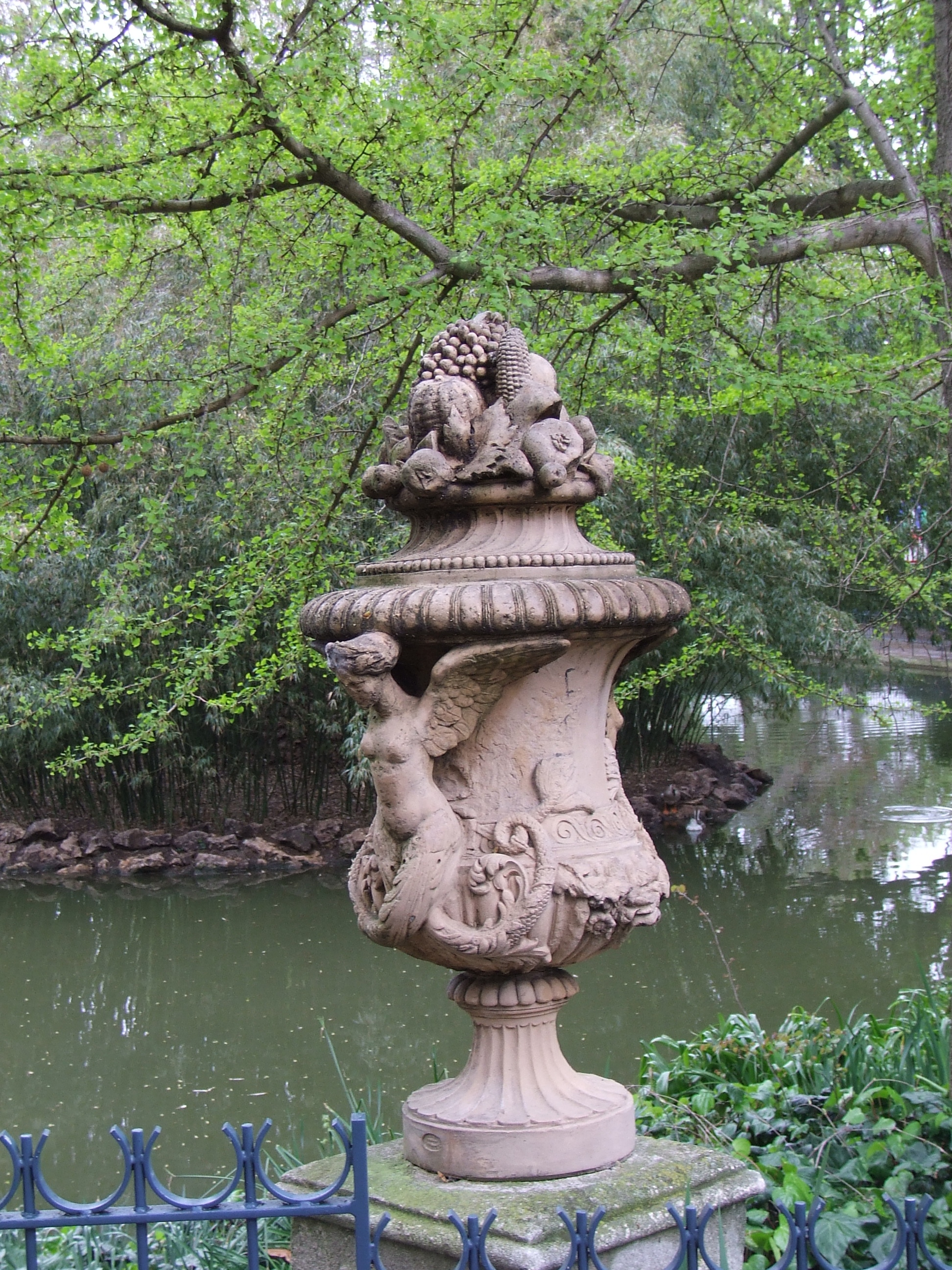
Ornamental Vase by Injalbert.Original photograph by Le petit Bitterois.

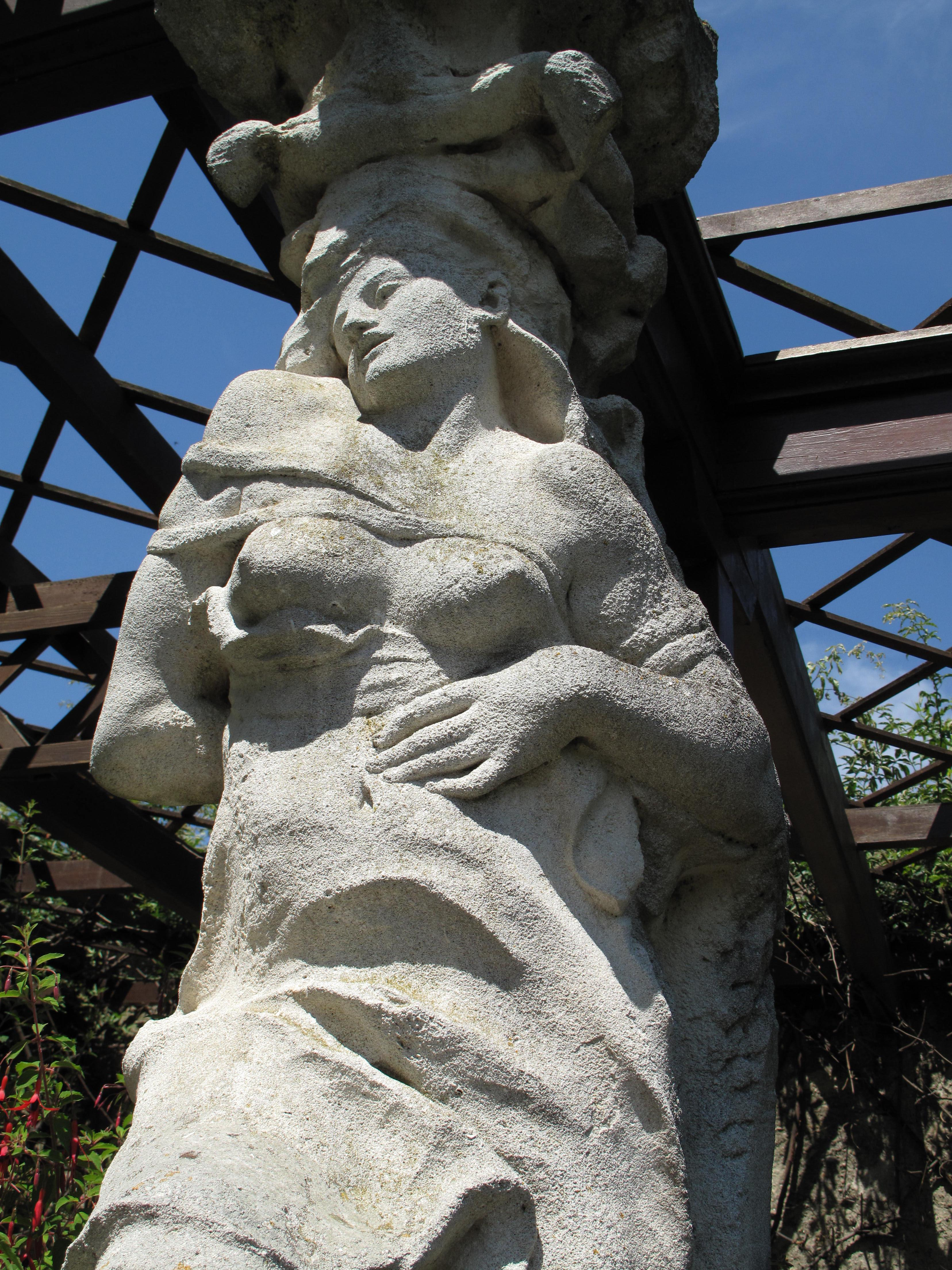
Injalbert sculpture in Villa Antonine. Original photograph by Le petit Bitterois.

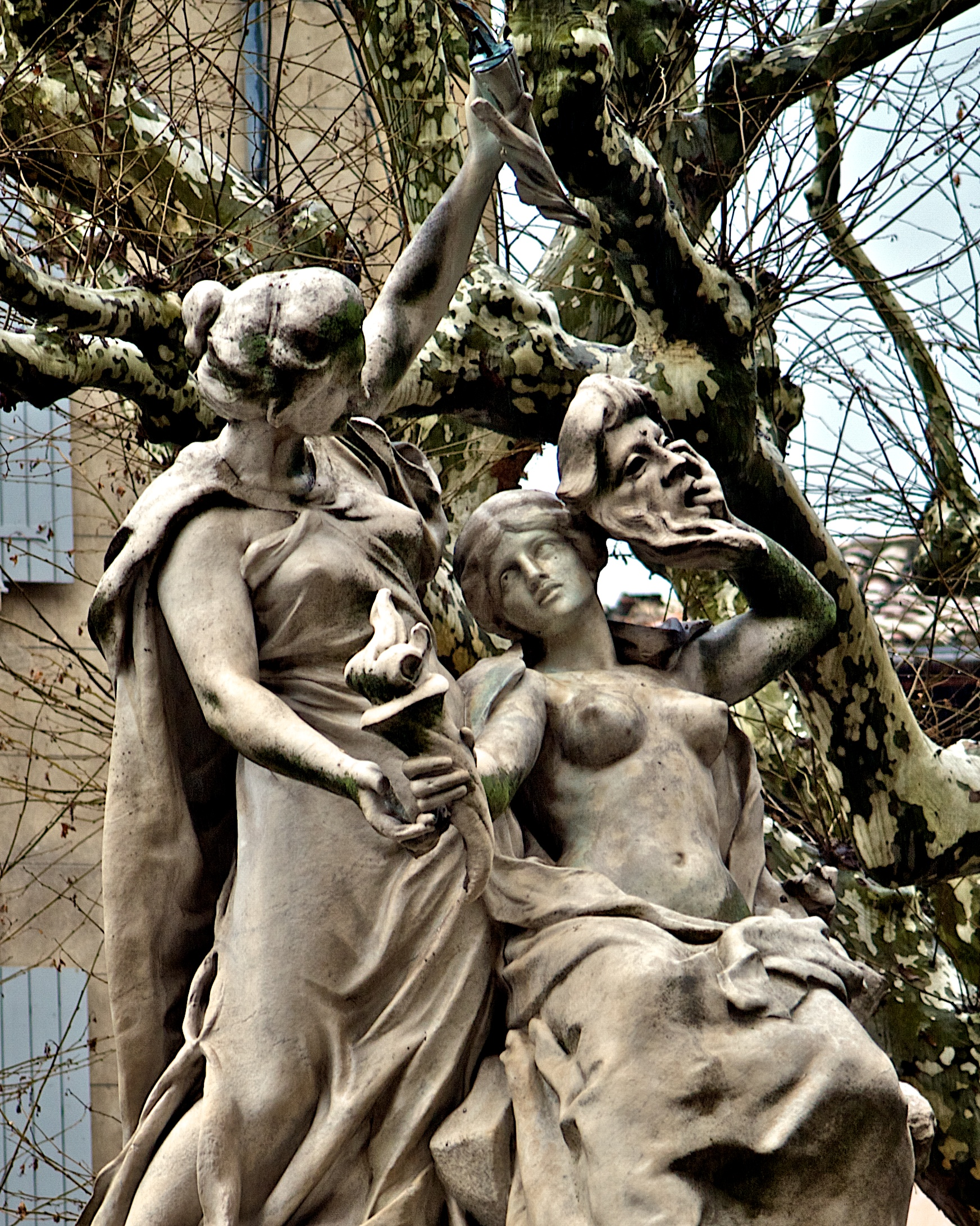
Injalbert sculpture in Orange. Original photograph by Tony Bowden

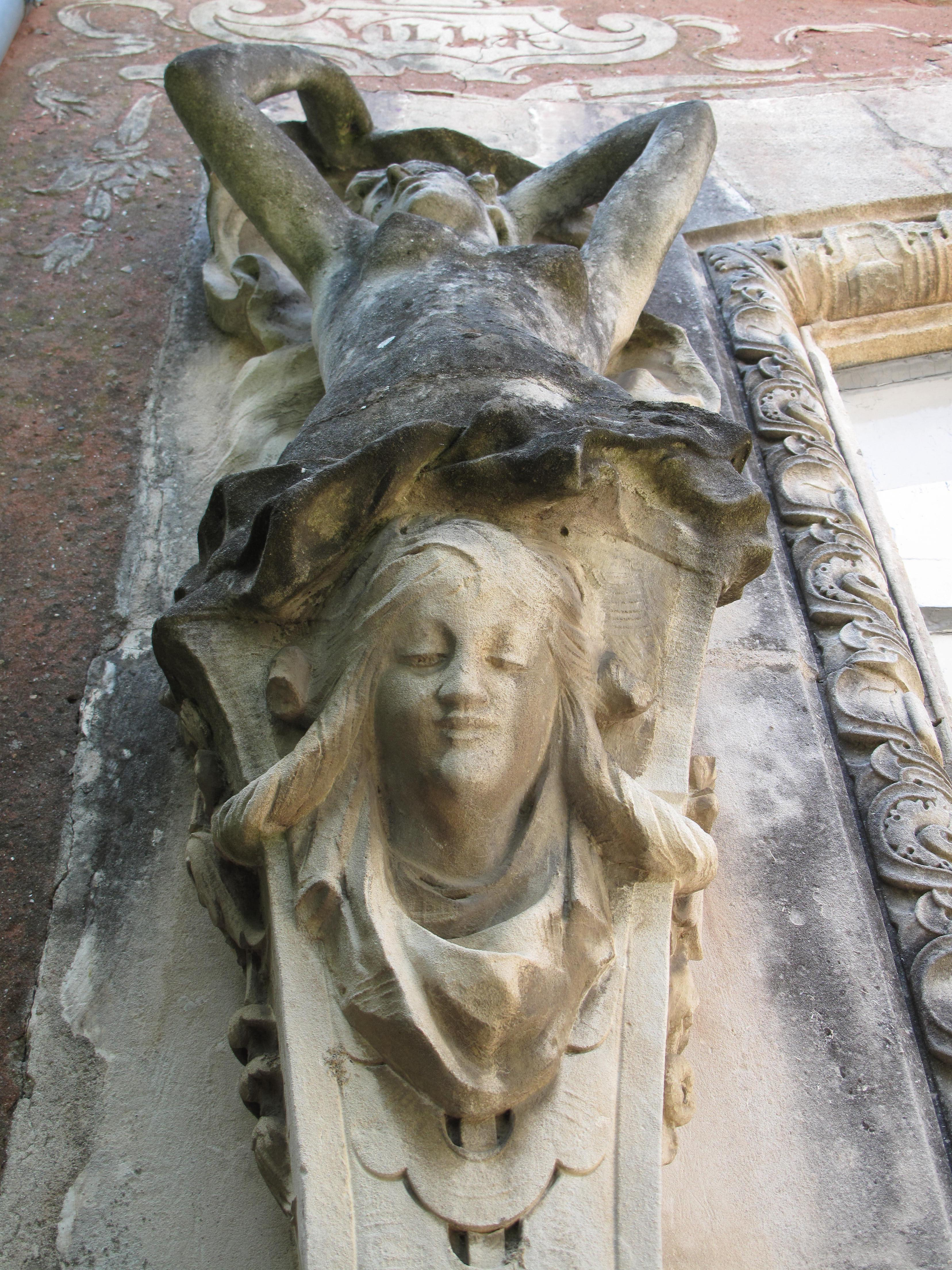
Injalbert sculpture in Villa Antonine. Original photograph by Le petit Bitterois.

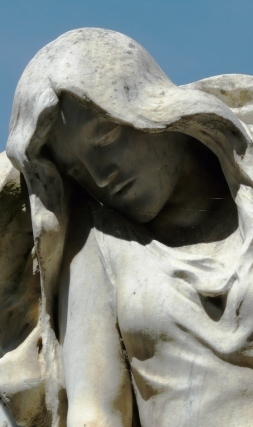
Close-up of sculpture on the grave of Jean Antoine Injalbert in Béziers. Photograph courtesy Brigitte Hamey.

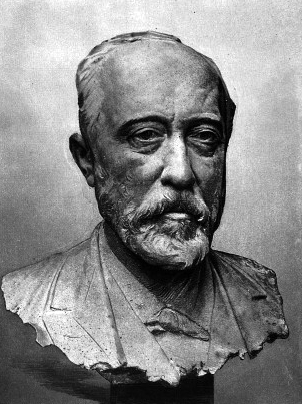
Injalbert's Paul Arène.

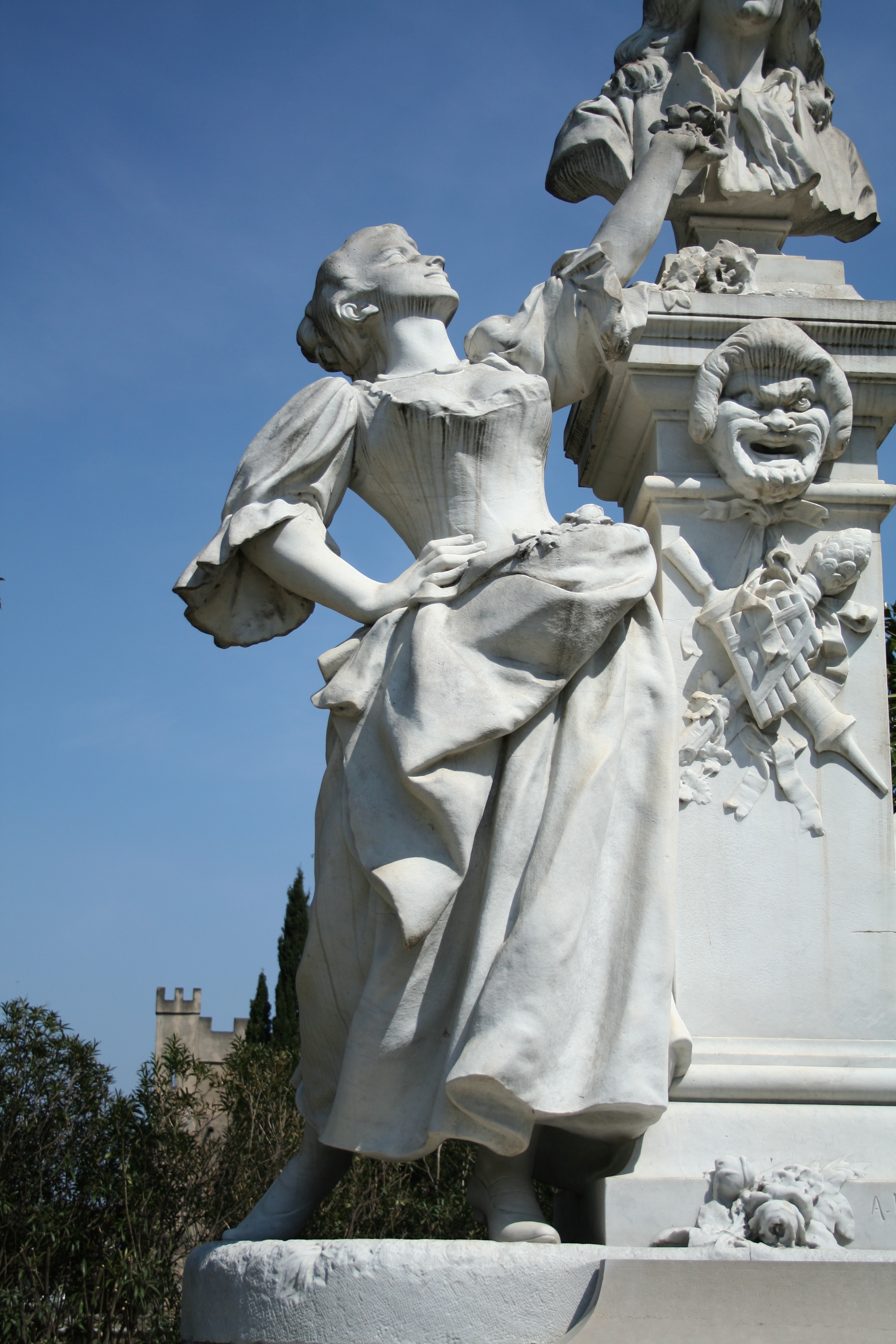
Part of Molière statue by Injalbert

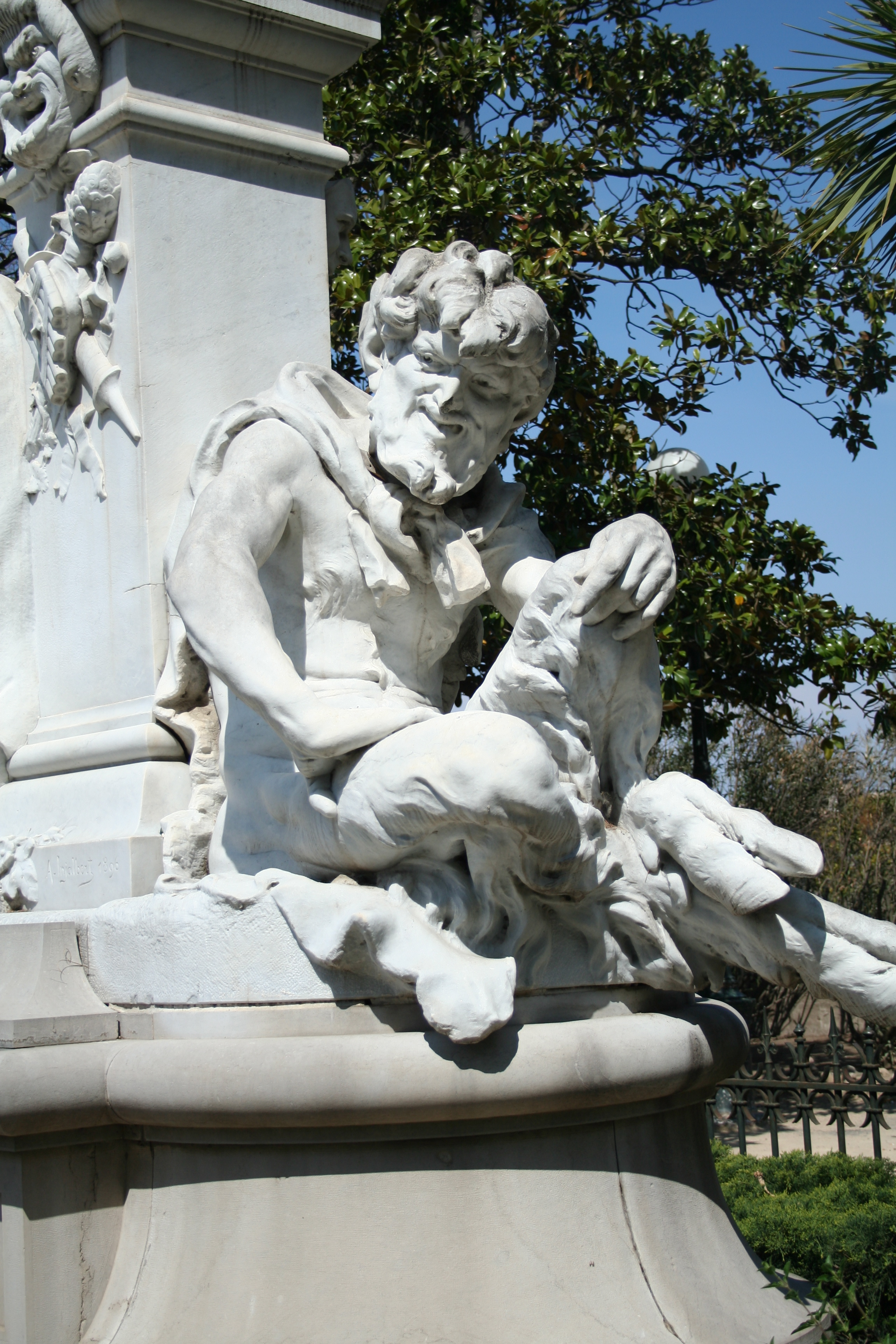
Part of Molière statue in Pezenas by Injalbert.

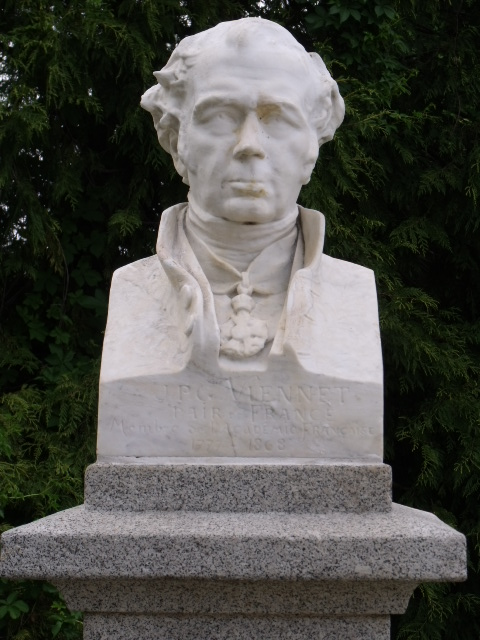
Injalbert's bust of J.P.Guillaume Viennet.

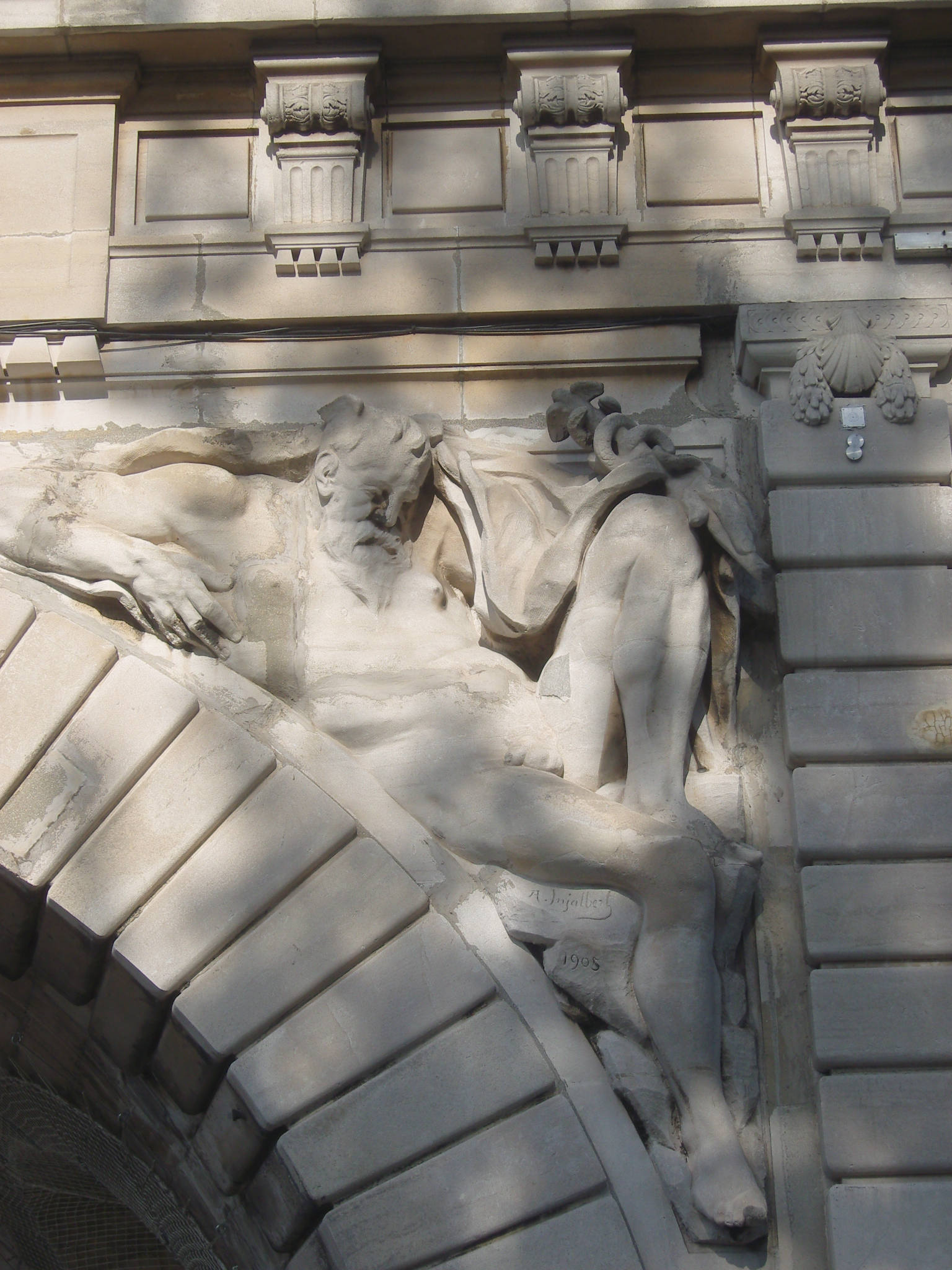
Injalbert's "Commerce" on the Pont de Bir-Hakeim.

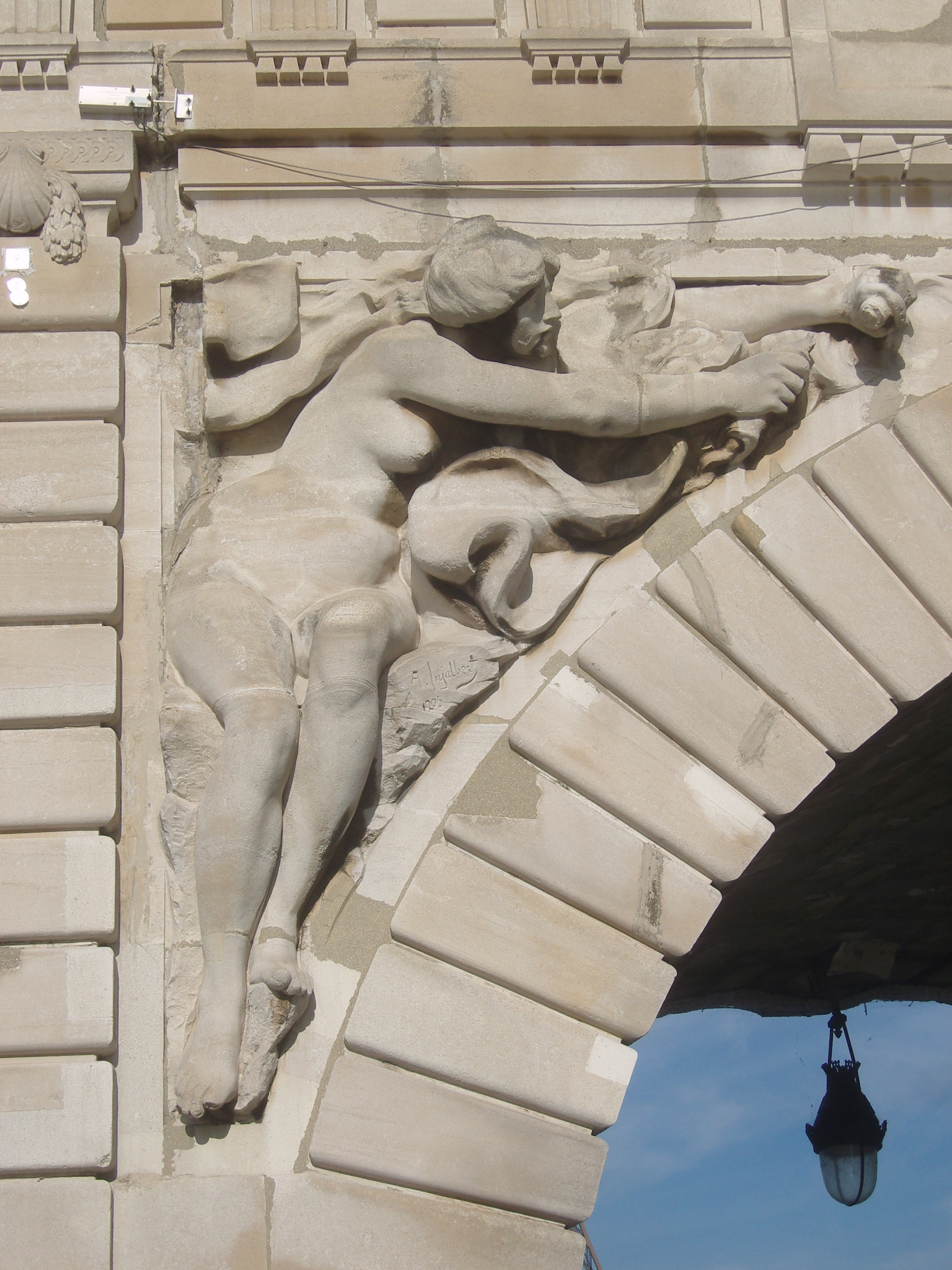
Injalbert's "Electricity" on the Pont de Bir-Hakeim

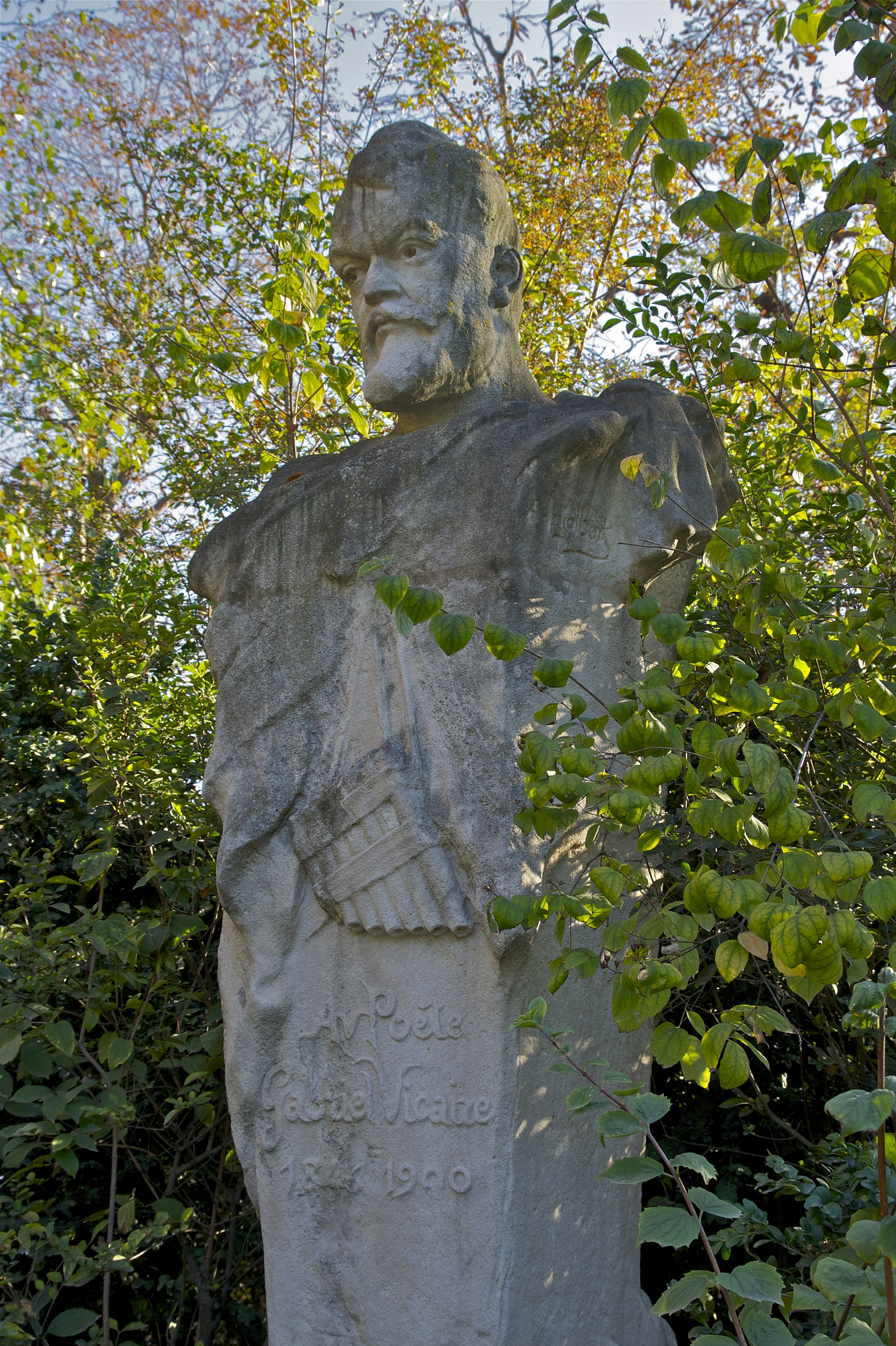
Gabriel Vicaire.

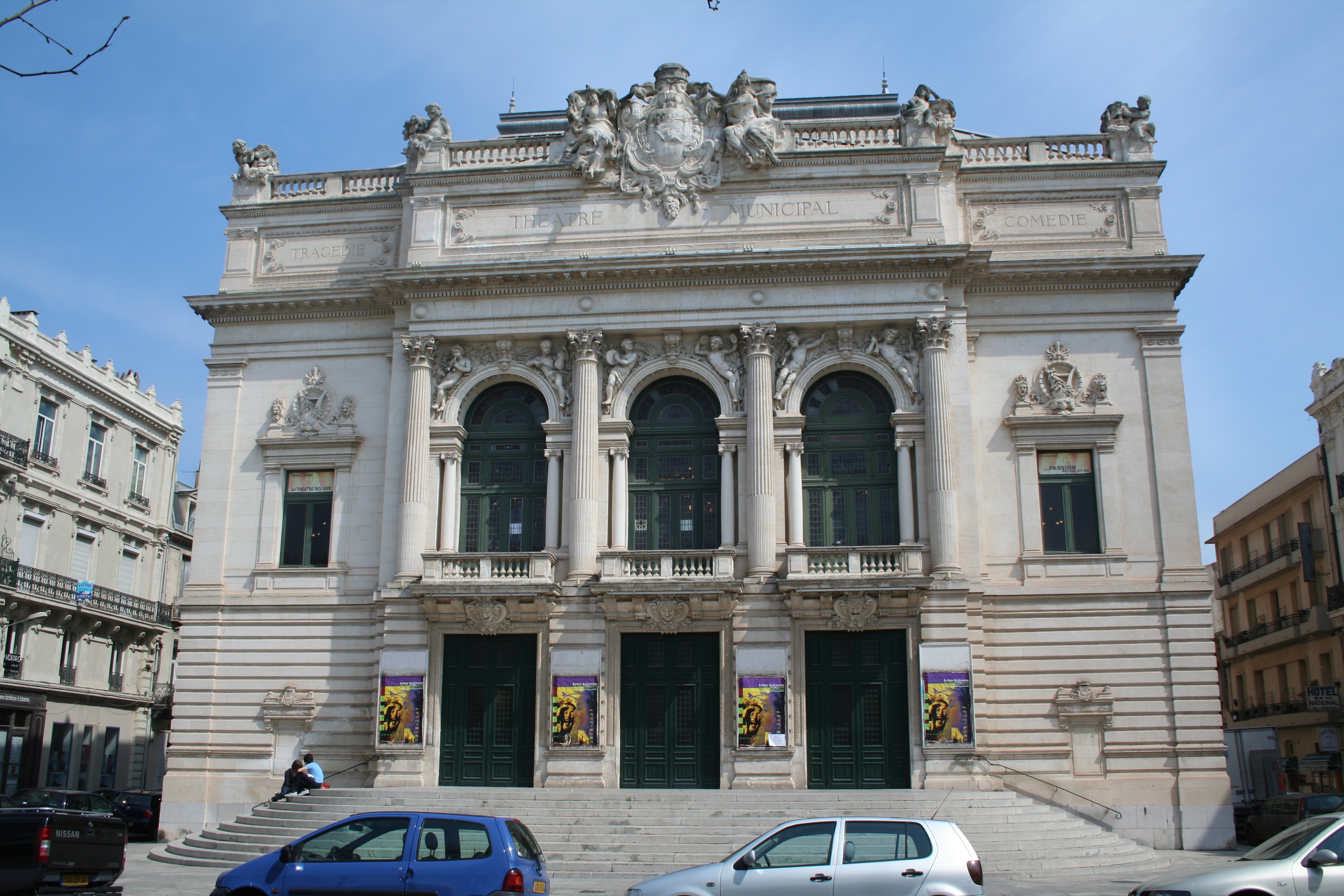
Injalbert sculpture on the front of the Théâtre Molière
