= Pradel =

Pradel is a surname and a given name. Notable people with the name include:

Given name:

- Pradel Pompilus (1914–2000), Haitian writer

Surname:

- A. George Pradel (1937–2018), American police officer and politician
- Gianmarco Pradel (born 2006), Australian racing driver
- Gregorio Gordo Pradel (1958–2021), Spanish politician and trade unionist
- Jean Pradel (1933–2021), French jurist, magistrate and professor
- Linda Pradel (born 1983), French handball player

== See also ==
- Laval-Pradel, commune in the Gard department in southern France
- Comte de Pradel, Jules Jean-Baptiste François de Chardebœuf (1779–1857), French nobleman and government official
