= Michel Faré =

French writer and art historian (1913–1985)

Michel Faré (1913–1985) was a French writer and art historian, author of two seminal works on French still life.

== Publications ==
- Le Grand siècle de la nature morte le XVIIe, Paris, Fribourg, Office du livre, 1974.
- La Vie silencieuse en France, la nature morte au XVIIIe, Paris Fribourg, Office du livre, 1976. In collaboration with his son, Fabrice Faré.

== See also ==
- List of Académie des Beaux-Arts members: Unattached
