= Henri Delaborde (painter) =

French painter

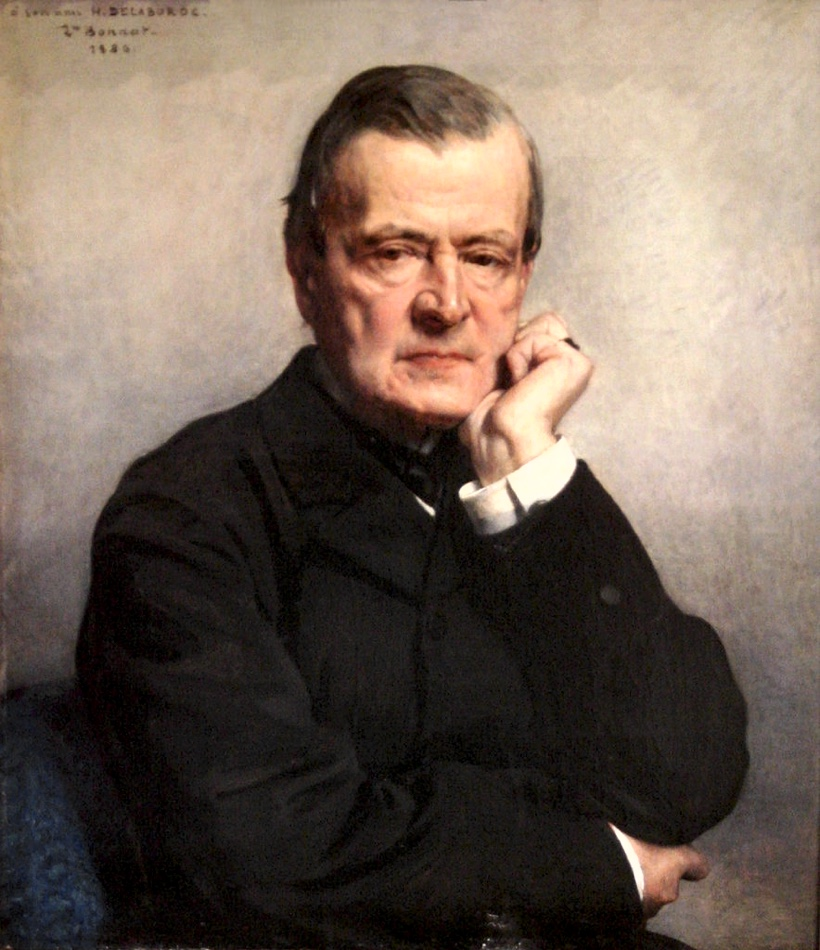
Henri Delaborde (1886); portrait by Léon Bonnat.

Count Henri Delaborde (1811–1899) was a French art critic and historical painter, born in Rennes, son of Count Henri François Delaborde.

== Life and career ==
He studied for some time in Paris with Delaroche and afterward produced historical pictures of a rather conventional classical type. Among them are:

- Hagar in the Desert (1836, Dijon Museum)
- St. Augustine (1837)
- The Knights of St. John of Jerusalem restoring religion in Armenia (1844), at Versailles

Constantin III of Armenia (Guy de Lusignan) on his throne with the Hospitallers. "Les chevaliers de Saint-Jean-de-Jerusalem rétablissant la religion en Arménie", 1844 painting by Henri Delaborde.

He also painted frescoes in the Saint Clotilde Basilica. But he is known principally as a critic of art. Besides his writings, as perpetual secretary of the Académie des Beaux-Arts, he contributed to the Revue des Deux Mondes and other periodicals. The articles have been collected as Mélanges sur l'art contemporain (1866) and Etudes sur les beaux-arts en France et en Italie (1864). He published, among other volumes:

- Ingres, sa vie, ses travaux, sa doctrine (1870)
- Lettres et pensés d'Hippolyte Flandrin (1865)
- Gérard Edelinck (1886)
- La gravure (1882)
- La gravure en Italie (1883)
- Marc Antoine Raimondi (1887)
- La Maîtres florentins du XV siècle (1889)
- L'Académie des Beaux-Arts depuis la fondation de l'Institut de France (1891)

Count Delaborde was elected to the Institute in 1868 and was conservator of the department of prints in the National Library, Paris, from 1855 to 1885.
