= François-Anatole Gruyer =

French art historian (1825–1909)

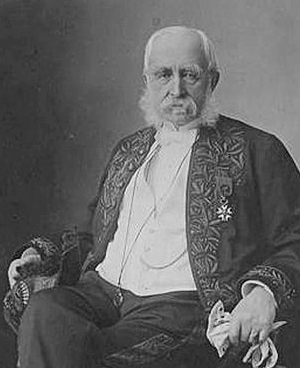
François-Anatole Gruyer (c. 1895)

François-Anatole Gruyer (15 October 1825, Paris - 27 October 1909, Chantilly) was a French art historian, and conservator at the Louvre.

== Biography ==
He initially studied engineering at the École Centrale des Arts et Manufactures, then physics and chemistry at the École d'Agronomie de Versailles. During a trip to Italy, he developed a deep interest in art, and began devoting himself to the study of painting. After several more visits to Rome and Florence, he published works on Renaissance art, and would eventually become a recognized expert on Raphael.

He began a career in art administration in 1871, and was promoted to Inspector General in 1872. Three years later, he was elected to the Académie des Beaux-Arts, where he took Seat #9 in the "Unattached" section. In 1881, he was named conservator of the Département des Peintures at the Louvre, but resigned in 1886, following a serious disagreement with his superiors.

In 1855, he had married Marie Prévost, granddaughter of a former Mayor of Chantilly. This connection resulted in an invitation from Henri d'Orléans, Duke of Aumale, to inspect and evaluate his collection. He also introduced the Duke to the architect, Honoré Daumet, who would assist with reconstructing the Château de Chantilly. In 1889, the Duke would entrust him with writing a catalogue raisonné of the collection at what would later become the Musée Condé. This occupied him to the extent that he resigned his seat at the Académie in 1890, and settled in Chantilly.

Following the Duke's death in 1897, he was chosen to be curator of the new Musée, a position he held until his own death. During those years, he wrote and published numerous books and articles about his work there.

== Sources ==
- Justin de Selves, "Notice sur la vie et les travaux de M. Anatole Gruyer", Institut de France (Académie des Beaux-Arts), 1910, n° 21, pp.1-17
- Jules Lermina (Ed.), Dictionnaire universel illustré biographique de la France contemporaine. L. Boulanger, 1884 (Online @ Gallica)
- Biographical timeline, references, and critical study by Nicole Garnier-Pelle @ the Institut National d'Histoire de l'Art
