= Jean Bourguignon =

French curator and writer

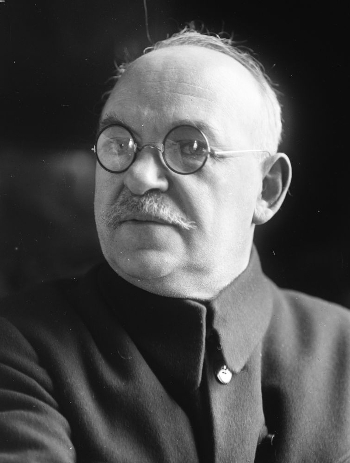
Jean Bourguignon (late 1930s)

Joseph Jean Bourguignon (7 April 1876 - 10 December 1953) was a French curator and writer; primarily of histories dealing with the Napoleonic era.

== Biography ==
He was born in Charleville-Mézières to Jean-Baptiste Joseph Paul Bourguignon, a travelling salesman, and his wife, Marie Louise Chérie, née Richard. He completed his secondary education at a local lycée in 1894, then went to Paris, where he attended the École des Hautes-Études and the Sorbonne, earning a degree in history in 1899.

In 1905, he was placed in charge of reorganizing the library and archives at the Ministry of the Navy. He became chief assistant to Paul Painlevé at the Ministry of Public Instruction in 1915 and, the following year, was named conservator of the Château de Malmaison; a position he would hold until 1946.

After 1946, he directed the Musée de l'Armée at the Hôtel des Invalides, and was conservator-in-chief for the Musées Nationaux (Musée du Louvre, Musée du Luxembourg, Musée des Antiquités Nationales, and the Château de Versailles). In 1949, he was elected to the Académie des Beaux-Arts, where he took Seat #8 in the "Unattached" section.

His notable works include: Les Adieux de Malmaison, 29 juin 1815, J. Vrin, 1930; Corvisart, premier médecin de Napoléon, Baschet, Lyon, 1937; and Napoléon, Eds.TEL, 1943, which was awarded the Prix Hercule-Catenacci in 1944.

He died in Paris.

== Sources ==
- Biographical data from the Comité des travaux historiques et scientifiques @ La France Savante
- Brief biography @ Babelio
- A. Decaux, "Jean Bourguignon (1876-1953), in memoriam", In: Revue de l'Institut Napoléon, January 1954
