= Étienne de Cardaillac =

Count Jacques-Étienne de Cardaillac (8 August 1818, Saint-Priest-Ligoure – 14 December 1879, Paris) was a French nobleman. He served as departmental council for the commune of Châlus, and held several positions under Emperor Napoleon III.

== Biography ==
He entered public service with Emperor Napoleon III, a close acquaintance. He was appointed to the Ministry of Public Works (now the Ministry of Ecology), and named Director of the Dépôt des marbres in 1858. He also served as Director of Civil Buildings and National Palaces, a position he held until 1877, under the Third Republic. During Haussmann's renovation of Paris, he participated in the decisions of the State Works Commission.

In 1860, he was a member of the jury at the competition to create a design for the opera house that would come to be called the Palais Garnier. In a controversial move, the jury rejected a popular favorite, Eugène Viollet-le-Duc; choosing instead a relatively unknown architect named Charles Garnier. Despite his lack of an education in art, he was a friend of many artists, architects, and designers; notably Félix Duban, who he met while engaged in making real estate investments for the National Palaces. In 1864, he helped establish a real estate company, devoted to rebuilding the Arènes district of Limoges, near his home town, which had been destroyed by a fire.

He was named a Knight in the Legion of Honor in 1858, and promoted to Commander in 1869. From 1863, he was a life member of the Société française de photographie. He was elected to the Académie des Beaux-Arts in 1874, where he took Seat #3 in the "Unattached" section, succeeding the art critic, Henri Delaborde, who had resigned.
