= Gustave Larroumet =

French art historian (1852–1903)

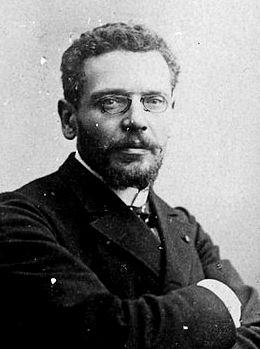
Gustave Larroumet (c.1900)

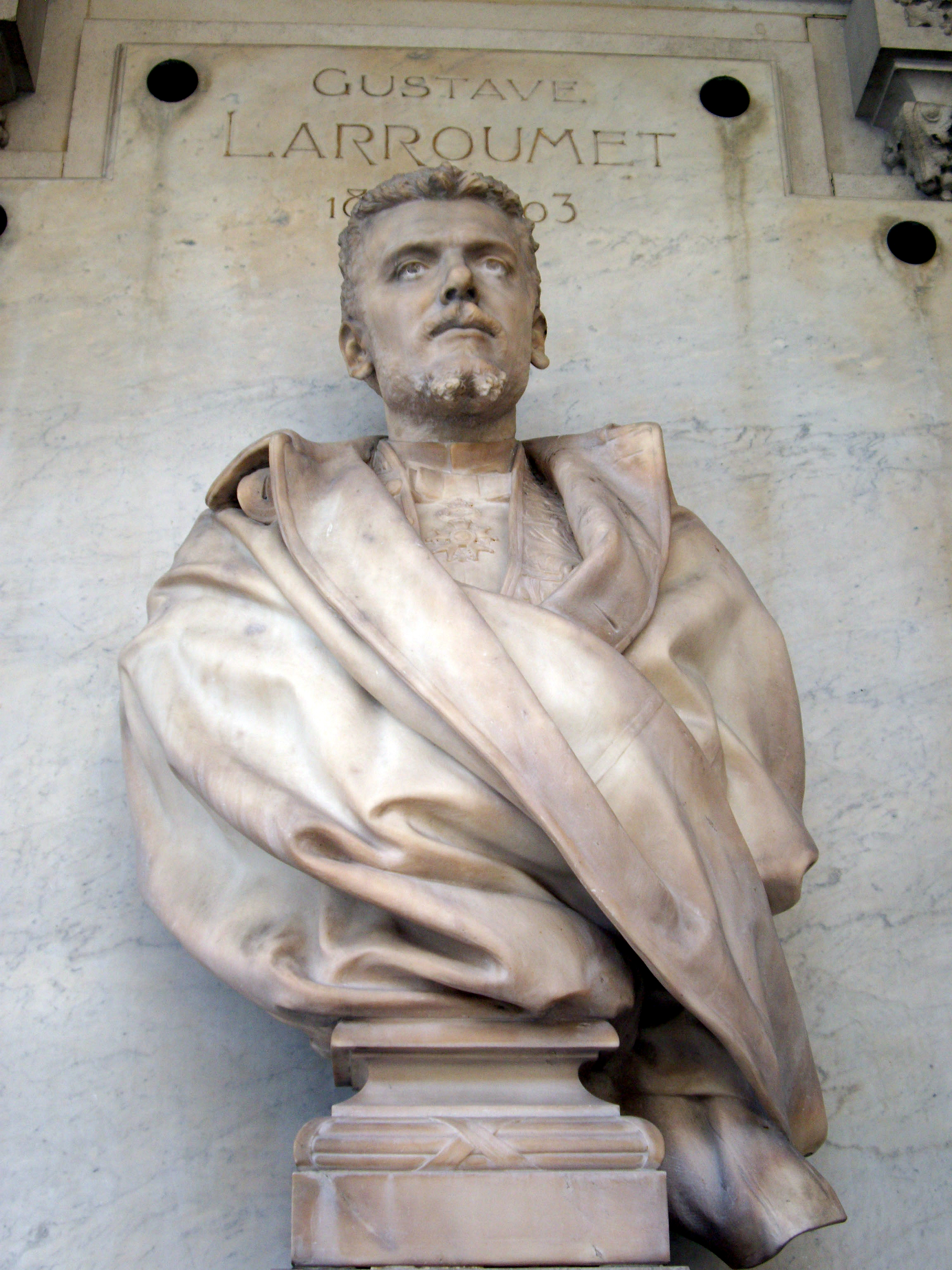
Bust of Larroumet, by Paul Roussel, on the façade of the Comédie-Française

Louis Barthélemy Gustave Paul Larroumet (22 September 1852 in Gourdon – 25 August 1903 in Paris) was a French art historian, literary critic, and administrator.

== Biography ==
His father was an army officer. After completing his secondary education at the lycée in Cahors, he initially considered a military career, then began studying medicine, but was forced to quit, due to poor health. Despite this, he volunteered at the outbreak of the Franco-Prussian War, serving with the Army of the Loire as a sniper. After the war, he was presented with the Médaille Militaire

From then until 1874, he was a teacher in various provincial schools; passing his exam to become an agrégé in 1875. That same year, he became a substitute professor of rhetoric at the Lycée de Vendôme. Later, he was a professor of grammar at the Collège Stanislas, and the Lycée Henri-IV.

In 1882, he was awarded his doctorate in letters, and was named a lecturer in French literature at the Sorbonne in 1884. While there, he wrote numerous critical works, including studies of Marivaux, Molière and Racine. He also served as Chief-of-Staff to the Minister of Public Instruction, becoming Director of the Sub-Directorate of Fine Arts, under the direction of Edouard Lockroy.

He held that position until 1891, when he was elected to the Académie des Beaux-Arts; taking Seat #8 in the "Unattached' section. In 1896, he was appointed a special envoy to the first Olympic Games in Athens. Later, in 1898, he would publish his Journal d'un voyage en Grèce et en Syrie. That same year, he resigned his seat at the Académie to become its Secrétaire Perpétuel.

He was also interested in photography, and was a member of the Grand Orient de France Masonic lodge. His wife, Clémence Annat, was the daughter of a doctor. They had two daughters; Jeanne, who married the historian, Émile Bertaux, and Germaine, who married the sculptor, Paul Roussel.

Streets have been named after him in Paris, Gourdon, Catus (where his parents were born), and Cahors.
