= Jules Jean-Baptiste François de Chardebœuf =

French nobleman and government official

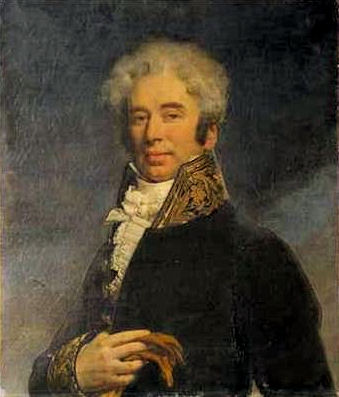
The Comte de Pradel, by Jean-Baptiste Mauzaisse

Jules Jean-Baptiste François de Chardebœuf, Comte de Pradel (13 July 1779, near Arthezé - 20 September 1857, Tour-en-Sologne) was a French nobleman and government official.

== Biography ==
He was the son of Jean-Baptiste de Chardebœuf (1709–1792), Marquis (later Comte) de Pradel, and a Knight in the Order of Saint Louis, who was promoted to Lieutenant-General in 1780. Jean-Baptiste emigrated in 1791, to command a brigade of the Armée des émigrés. The following year, Jules and the rest of his family fled France to join him in London. Jules would remain there until 1814; returning shortly after the beginning of the Restoration, to claim his title.

During the reign of Louis XVIII, he was First Chamberlain, Master of the Wardrobe, and Director General of the Ministry of the Maison du Roi. In that position, he was also involved in the affairs of the Louvre, the Musée du Luxembourg, the Théâtre Français, and the Paris Opera. Accordingly, in 1816, he was elected to the Académie des Beaux-Arts, where he became the first to occupy Seat #4 in the "Unattached" section. He would hold that seat until his death, forty-one years later.

In 1817, he married Angélique Laure Hermine de Martel (1802–1870), from Autry.

He was the anonymous author of Des Principes de la monarchie constitutionnelle et de leur application en France et en Angleterre (1820). Under Charles X, he was a member of the Conseil Privé. During the Revolution of 1848, he served as a Departmental Councilor for Loir-et-Cher.

He died at the Château de Villesavin, which is now an historical monument; housing several small museums.
