= École nationale supérieure d'architecture de Versailles =

French architecture school

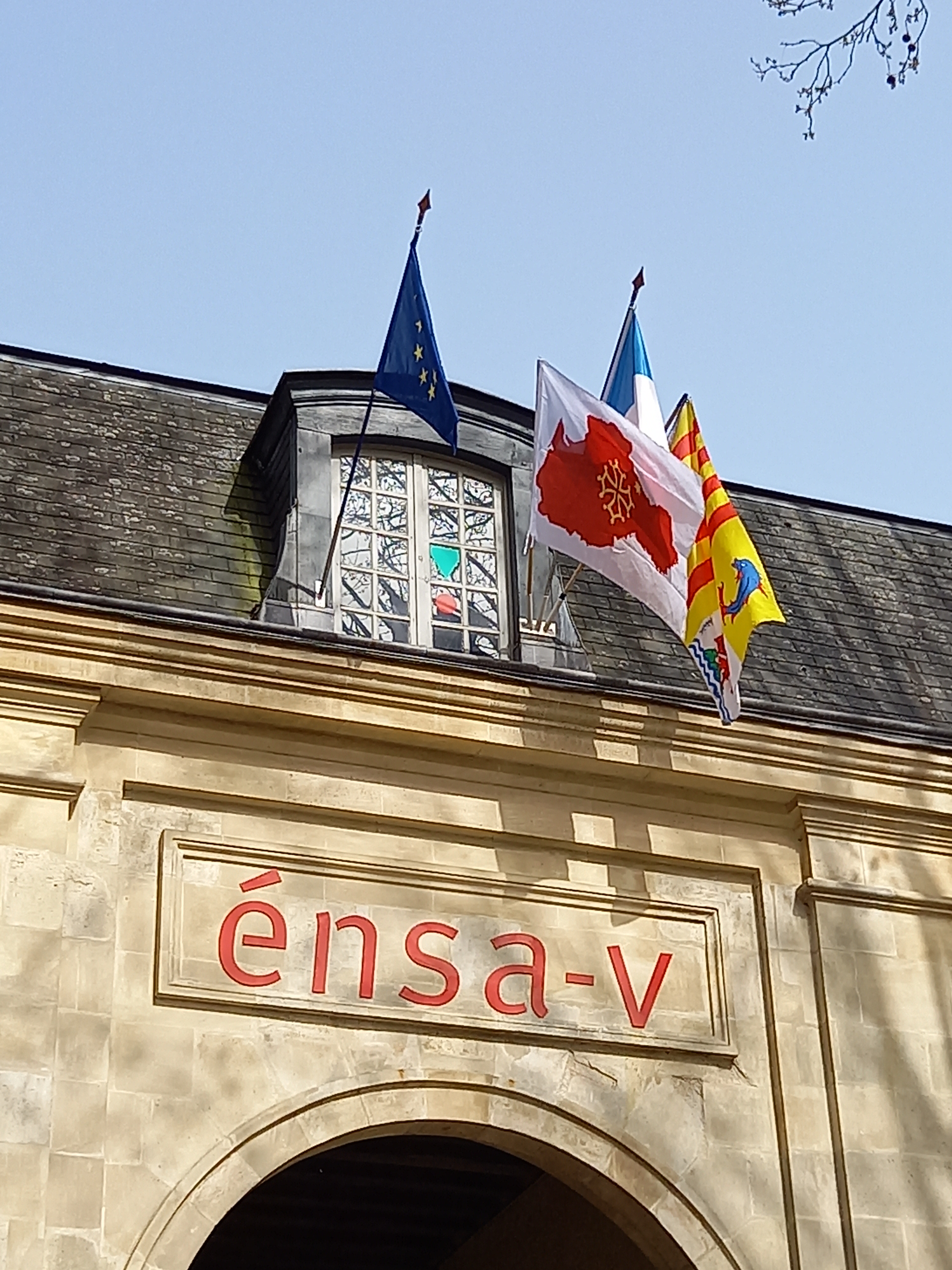
- Type: Public state university
- Established: 1969
- Director: Jean-Christophe Quinton
- Academic staff: 119
- Students: 1224 (222 foreign students)
- Location: Versailles, France
- Language: French
- Website: www.versailles.archi.fr

The École nationale supérieure d'architecture de Versailles commonly referred to as the ENSAV, is a leading French architectural school located at the ancient stables of the Versailles Palace. It is an associate member of the University Paris-Saclay. The pedagogical aim of the National Architecture School of Versailles is to provide an intense experience in the architectural arts while developing questions of architecture in the fields of building, city and regional planning. The school prepares students using diverse professional exercise methods and its specially known for its urban design teachings.

The school is listed among the 50 best European architecture schools according to Domus since the beginning of this ranking established in 2013.

== History ==
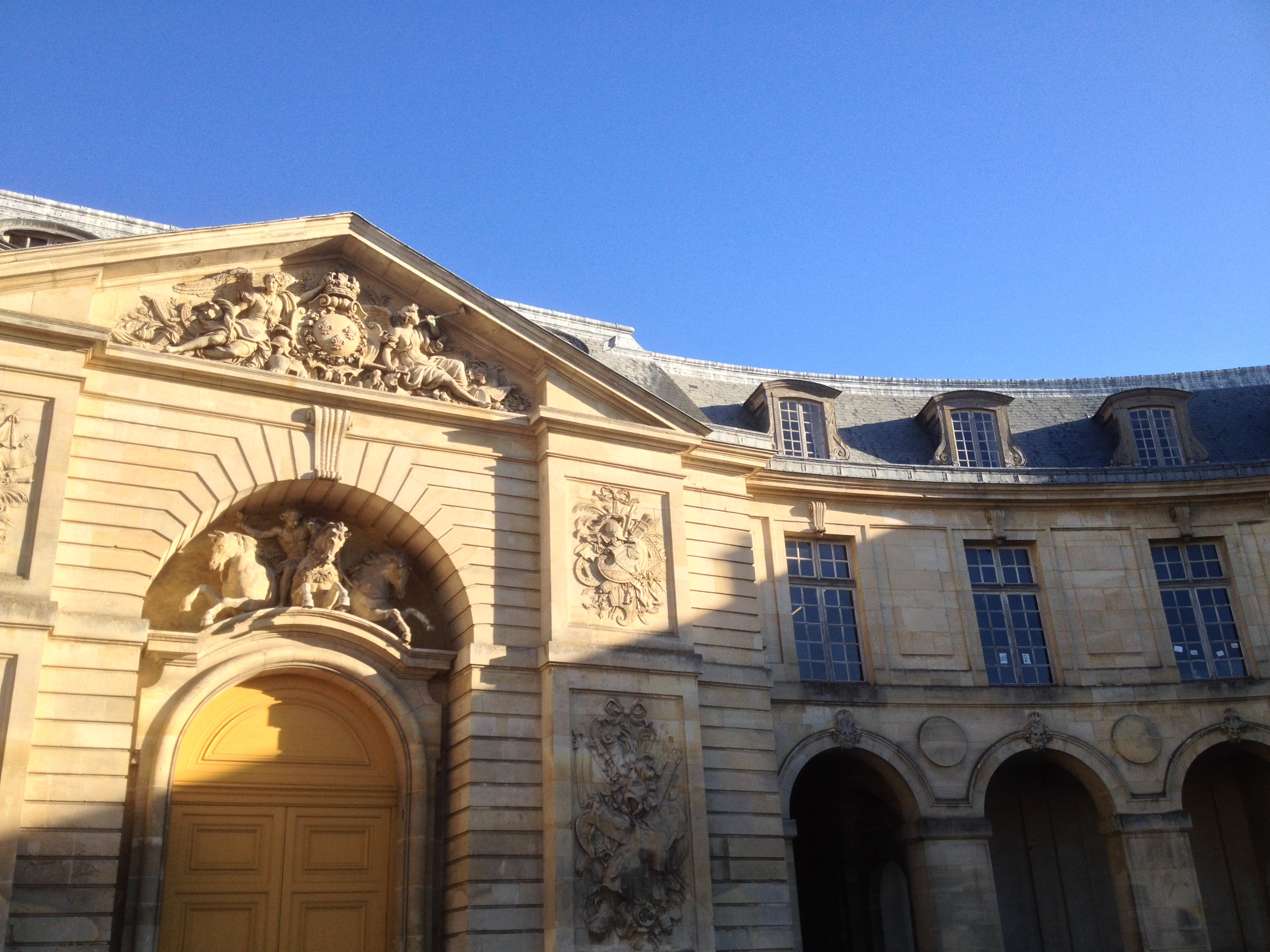
The school

The school was founded in 1969 as a division of the École des beaux-arts architecture section. Architect Jean Castex was one of the school's founders, while Nicolas Michelin (co-founder of the group Labfac) was the managing director from 2001 to 2009. The current dean is the architect Nicolas Dorval-Bory.

== Directors ==
| Director | Mandat | Profession |
|---|---|---|
| André Lew | 19--–1990 | – |
| Alexandre Metro | 1990–1993 | – |
| Olivier Brochard | 1993–1999 | – |
| Sylvie Clavel | 1999–2000 | – |
| Nicolas Michelin | 2000–2009 | Architect |
| Vincent Michel | 2010–2015 | Architect |
| Jean-Christophe Quinton | 2015–2024 | Architect |
| Nicolas Dorval-Bory | 2025–present | Architect |

== Former students ==
- Jeanne Gang
- Moussa Mostafa Moussa
- Christine Leconte
- Catherine Furet
- Clément Blanchet
- Anne Démians
- Pascal Gontier
- Jean-Pierre Pranlas-Descours
- Nicolas Godin
- François Roche

== Facilities of the school ==
- 3 applied research laboratories
- 1 documentation center and library
- 1 model workshop
- 1 photo development laboratory
- 1 photo studio
- 3 multimedia rooms
- 1 computer room
- 1 digital workshop
- 1 amphitheater
- 1 auditorium
- 1 restaurant
- 1 café
- 2 exhibition spaces "La Rotonde" and "La Forge"
- 1 Large nave, "La Nef" (venue for workshops, exhibitions, educational experiments)
- 1 modern exhibition center "La Maréchalerie"
- studios

== Research and theory ==
=== Research centers ===
The Léav is the research center of the school. It has participated in the foundation of the PATRIMA laboratory. The latter is a member of the SHS (University of Paris-Saclay) doctoral school.

LADRHAUS and GRAI are two other research laboratories of the ENSAV.

It organizes public conferences of researchers and theoreticians: Jean-Pierre Chupin, William J.R. Curtis, Antoine Grumbach ...

Board members: Jean Castex, David Mangin, Frédéric Borel, Gilles Clément, Jorge Orta, Antoine Picon, Paola Viganò, Jean-Philippe Vassal.

== Publications ==
The ENSAV publishes books and research conclusions via its edition unit.

- Research Publications:

Urban Forms: Death and Life of the Urban Block

This major publication by Jean Castex, Philippe Panerai and Jean-Charles Depaule (teachers of the school) had its first edition in French in 1977. It has been recently translated and edited in English for the first time in 2003 with an additional postscript.

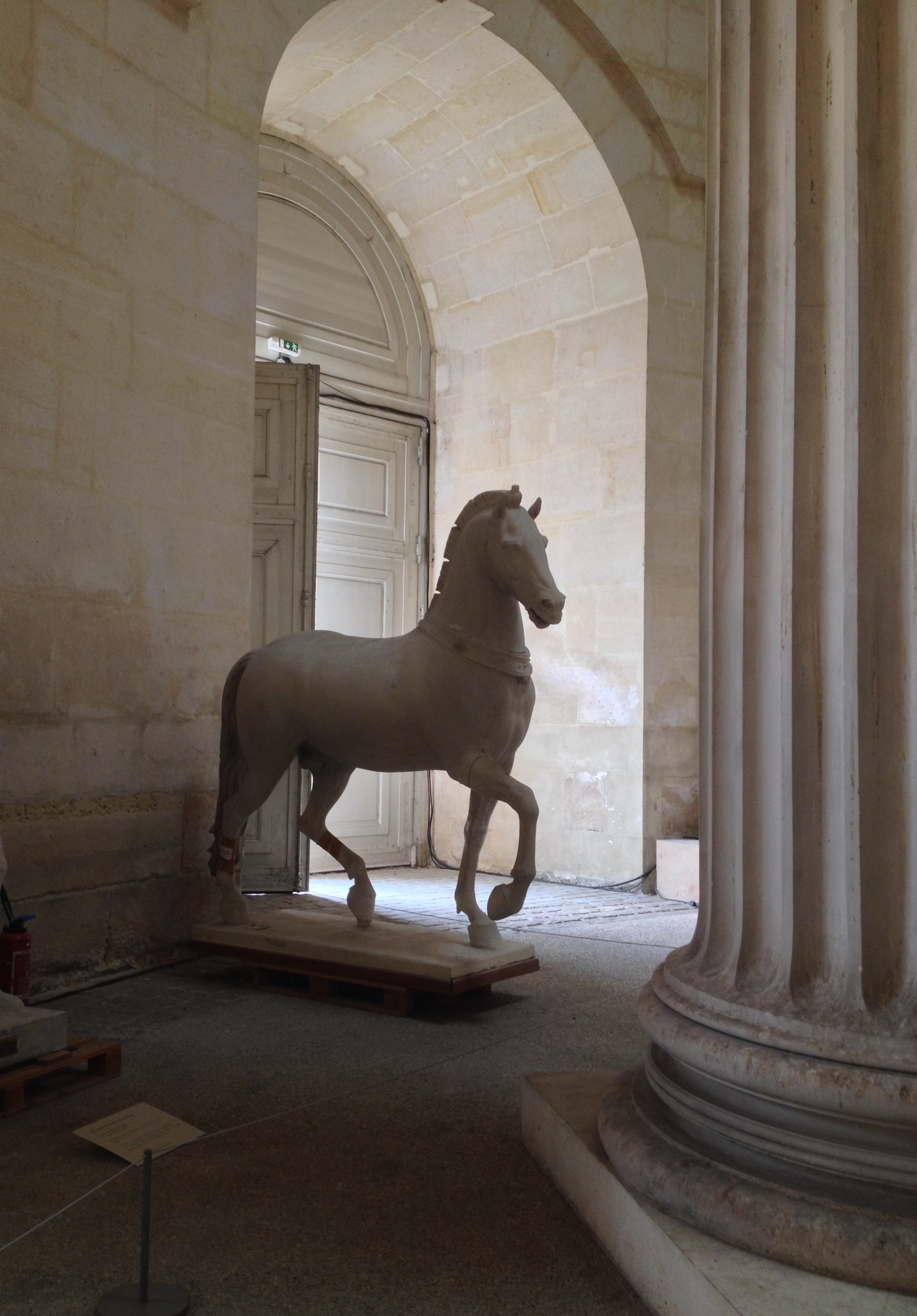
Doric Column inside the Ensav

- The annual "Yearbook" shows students work as well as teacher's writings and leading figures interviews related to architecture. Its development is part of the master thesis "Experimental processes, arts and media".
- The review EAV (Enseignement Architecture Ville) was created by Anne-Marie Chatelet and Michel Denes in 1995. It is published annually. The number 10th of the review (2004–2005) explained its history and origins. This same issue was based on journals and reviews from Zurich's Eidgenossische Technische Hochschule.
- ENSAV also supported the creation of the PLI magazine led by former school student Christopher Dessus.
- Le Pavé is a blog run by a masters' association renewed every year. Its purpose is to disseminate reflections, research or architectural criticism.

== International ==
The school has agreements with more than 36 universities worldwide. Each year, the ensav organises international workshops around the world (Isaphan, Dakar, Kyoto, Rome, Rio, Delft, Shangai, Casablanca...).

In 2016, the school collaborates with the EPFL to build an international experimentation project : "HOUSE 1/12 cities". They created a wood structure built at the Lausanne campus and then in Versailles. More than 200 people took part in this project.

Each year, a renowned artist is invited to conduct a four-week workshop with students. Past editions have been supervised by Hans Walter Muller, Tadashi Kawamata, Campana brothers, Miquel Barcelo, Lucy et Jorge Orta or Tomas Saraceno.

The ENSAV offers a dual master's degree entitled "Ecological Urbanism" with the Tongji University in China.

== International events ==
The ENSAV hosts and organizes various international events:

- Modern art exhibitions in its own museum: La Maréchalerie.
- Lectures: Kengo Kuma, Christian de Portzamparc, Marc Barani, Odile Decq, David Basulto (Archdaily founder), Chaix et Morel, X-TU architects, Rudy Riciotti, Frederic Borel, Abraham Poincheval, Mathieu Lehanneur, Paul Andreu, David Van Severen (teacher at the school), Jakob + Macfarlane, Felice Varini, Clément Blanchet (former student), Dominique Gonzalez-Foerster, Régis Roudil (invited teacher at the school) Laurent Grasso, Patrick Bouchain, Jean Rodet (former student), Duncan Lewis, Yann Kersalé, Klaus Pinter, Nicolas Dorval-Bory (teacher at the school), Richard Copans, Djamel Klouche (teacher at the school), Jean-Paul Jungmann, Bertrand Lamarche, Thomas Raynaud (teacher at the school), Mark Alizart, Kasper T.Toeplitz, Bruno Latour, Jean Castex, NP2F, Pascal Gontier (former student), Sébastien Martinez Barat (teacher at the school), Tanja Herdt, Matthias Armengaud (AWP, former student and teacher at the school), Éric Lapierre.
- Design Modeling Symposium: DSM17. This symposium offered classes, lectures, exhibitions and workshops under the topic "Humanizing digital reality". Some of the lecturers were Antoine Picon, Carlo Ratti, Arthur Mamou Mani, Philippe Rahm (ENSAV teacher).
- Bap ! First Paris region biennale in 2019.
