= Blanca Li =

Spanish dancer, actress, director (born 1964)

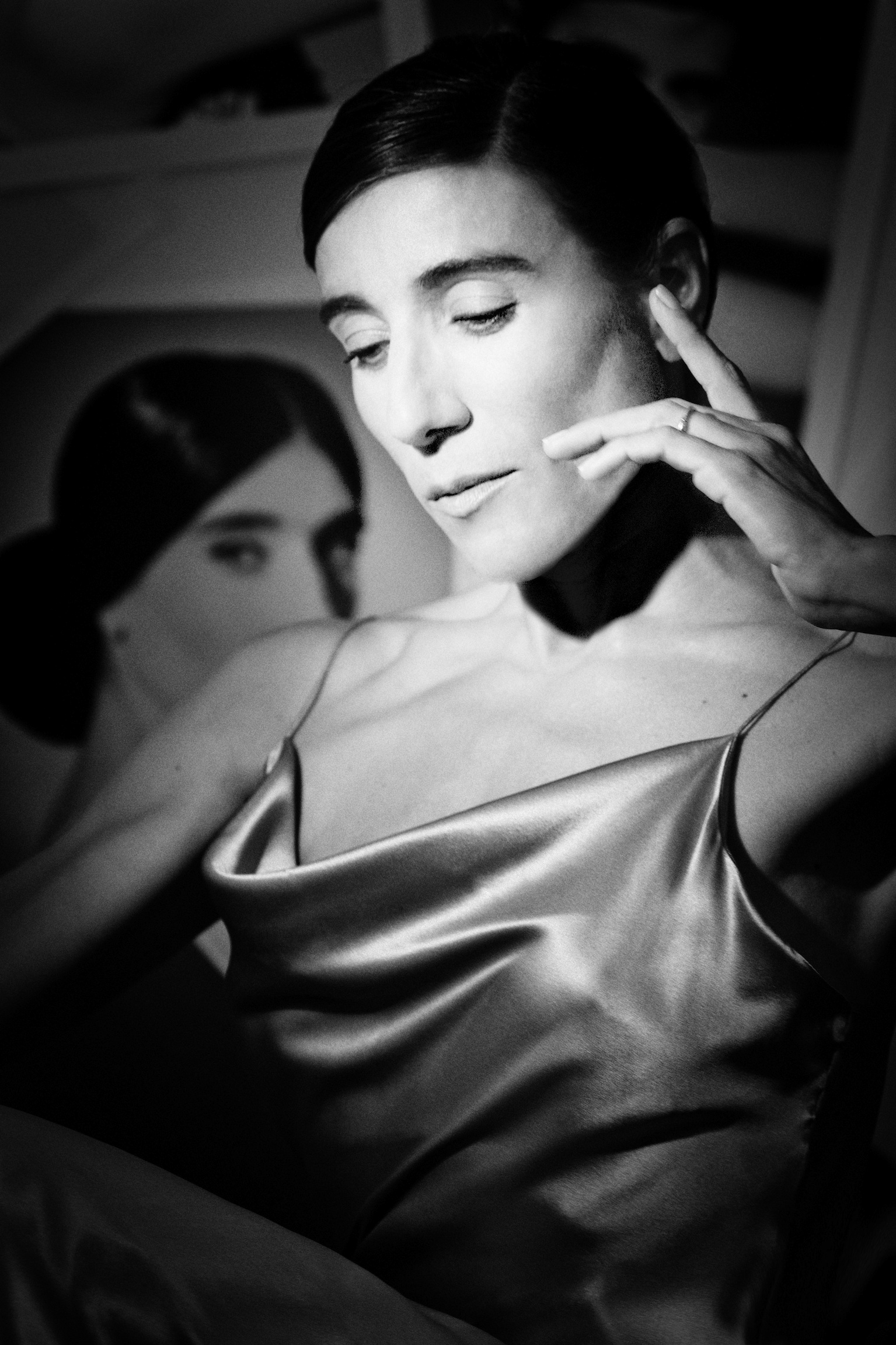
- Li in 2011
- Born: January 12, 1964 (age 62); Granada, Spain
- Education: Martha Graham School
- Occupations: Choreographer, film director, dancer, actress
- Years active: 1986-present
- Career
- Current group: Blanca Li Dance Company
- Dances: Contemporary dance, hip hop, flamenco, ballet, electro dance
- Website: blancali.com/en

Blanca Li, originally Blanca María Gutiérrez Ortiz (born January 12, 1964) is a Spanish choreographer, film director, dancer, and actress.

She has created choreographies for the Paris Opera Ballet, The Berlin Ballet, the Metropolitan Opera, for filmmakers like Pedro Almodóvar and Michel Gondry, and for musical artists like Beyoncé, Daft Punk ("Around the World" ), Paul McCartney, Kanye West and Coldplay, among others. Whether performance, opera, musical, museum installation, event, music video or feature film, she initiates and realizes a great number of projects: "I like to give life to all that’s in my brain". Never restricted to one style, she gets her inspiration from a broad spectrum of physical forms of expression (from flamenco to classical ballet and hip-hop).

== Formation ==
Blanca Li, originally Blanca María Gutiérrez Ortiz, was born in 1964 in Granada, in a nine-member family. She started to take Flamenco dance lessons during her childhood and participated in a contest to join the Spanish Rhythmic Gymnastics Team. She was accepted at the age of twelve, but she abandoned the team six months before the Olympics because of growth disorders. However, due to her need for physical activity, she decided to replace gymnastics with dance.

She moved to New York at the age of seventeen, where she was trained for five years as a dancer and choreographer at Martha Graham’s School. She also studied with Alvin Ailey, Paul Sanasardo and Merce Cunningham.

In New York she lived in Harlem, where she witnessed the birth of hip hop. Her first show took place in the East Village and it was a mix of different styles: classical, modern and hip hop dance. During those years, Blanca met Etienne Li, a mathematician who was also a Franco-Korean graffiti artist. He designed the pamphlets of her first show and would later become her partner.

During her time in New York, she created Xoxonees with her sister, a flamenco-rap band in which they danced wearing flamenco dressed. They received an offer in Spain, where they released an homonymous album in 1989. In the late eighties, she founded her first company in Madrid, a company she performed with in the Universal Exposition of Seville in 1992, also known as “Expo 92”.

Later that year, she moved to Paris. During her first year in the French capital, she worked in a cabaret at Place Pigalle where she introduced herself to singers and other artists.

== Blanca Li Dance Company ==
She settles in Paris in 1993 to install her own contemporary dance company, with 14 major pieces at her repertory since. She opens up her own dance studios in Paris in 1998. Fusion between disciplines and a very Latin sense of humor are present in most of her creations. Macadam Macadam, a hip-hop piece commissioned by Suresnes Cite Danse Festival in 1999, becomes the reference of the genre, while touring worldwide, from Avignon Festival to Festival of Arts and Ideas in New Haven, Connecticut. In 2006, in a series performed at the Théâtre Mogador of Paris, Macadam Macadam receives the Globes de Cristal for Best Musical. She creates her first one-woman show Zap! Zap! Zap!, which is successfully performed at Théâtre national de Chaillot in Paris and at The Kitchen in New York City for the France Moves Festival (2001).

She draws inspiration from various sources, from Gnawa trance ceremonies in Morocco for Nana et Lila or Ancient Greek art for Le Songe du Minotaure. She stages the madness of our contemporary world in the wake of September 11 attacks in collaboration with plastic artists Jorge and Lucy Orta for Borderline (2002). Corazón Loco, playing with love fusion and disintegration, combines dancers with lyrical singers of the vocal ensemble Sequenza 9.3, directed by Catherine Simonpietri on a contemporary score by Édith Canat de Chizy; Poet in New York, inspired by the poems of Federico García Lorca in New York City and commissioned by Andalucia's Ministry of Culture, has gathered nearly 150 000 spectators during its performances at the summer festival in Granada, (two seasons), Théâtre national de Chaillot in Paris, and Teatros del Canal in Madrid.

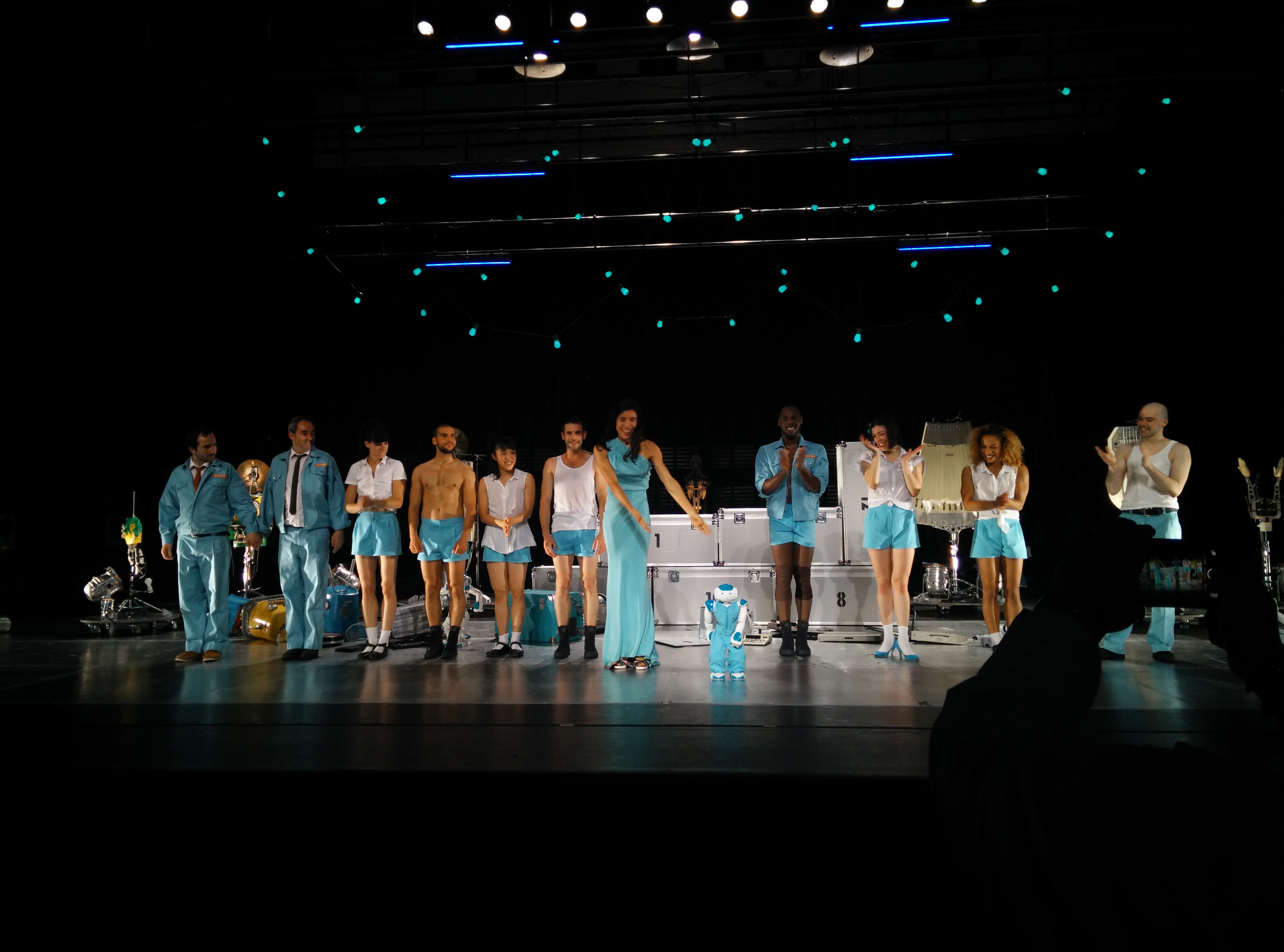
Li, NAO, dancers and crew of "Robot" at Brooklyn Academy of Music in 2015.

In 2013, Blanca Li Dance Company celebrates her 20th anniversary with four shows on tour for more than a 100 performances :

- Macadam Macadam still goes on with a Spanish–French team of hip hop dancers.
- Garden of Earthly Delights, an dreamlike fantasy inspired from the painting by Hieronymus Bosch.
- Elektro Kif, putting on stage for the first time the new “electro” street dance style (an original urban dance style born in France and spreading worldwide) for a long series at la Cigale in Paris after a successful world tour in Great Britain, Japan, China, Philippines, and Indonesia and France.
- Robot in collaboration with Japanese artists Maywa Denki and NAO robots from Aldebaran, premieres at Montpellier Danse 2013 Festival and ends the 2013 year at the Théâtre des Champs-Élysées in Paris for a sold-out series. This show is universally acclaimed by the press for opening new horizons on the use of robots on stage.

Robot had a one-week showing at the Brooklyn Academy of Music in 2015.

== Opera, theater, events, installations ==
Outside her company, Blanca Li has choreographed and produced a great number of projects for major institutions. In 1997, she was commissioned by the Nancy Opera to direct and choreograph two operas, La vida breve and El amor brujo, and, in 1999, the world premiere of Un Tango Pour Monsieur Lautrec. In 1999, the Paris Opera asks her for a contemporary choreography for the Baroque opera Les Indes galantes conducted by William Christie and produced by Andrei Serban. (Rameau's ballet opera, now part of the Opéra's repertoire, was released in DVD in 2005). For the turn of the millennium Blanca Li creates, together with trapeze artists, the air ballet Univers Unique. Monique Loudières, Danseuse Etoile of the Paris Opera Ballet company, asks Li to create a solo for her: Silhouette, to be performed at the Avignon Festival in 2000.

Highest honors in the dance world in 2001: the famous Paris Opera Ballet invites Li to create a new ballet on Scheherazade by Rimsky-Korsakov, together with Christian Lacroix as costume designer. In 2001, Blanca Li is nominated artistic director and choreographer of the Berlin Ballet at the Komische Oper Berlin in Germany, a company of 24 dancers, for whom she creates a new version of Le Songe du Minotaure, which is also performed at the Mérida Festival in Spain. Borderline is produced as world premiere by the Berlin Ballett in June 2002. In March 2003, Blanca Li creates at the Paris Opéra Bastille a choreography for William Tell, produced by Francesca Zambello. Al Andalus, featuring El amor brujo by Manuel de Falla is premiered at the Massy Opera before being performed at the Alhambra Palace for the International Festival of Music and Dance of Granada in June 2004.

In March 2004, Blanca Li is invited as choreographer for the new Don Giovanni production at the Metropolitan Opera in NYC produced by Marthe Keller. In 2005 she creates the choreography for the musical comedy Bagdad Café together with Bob Telson and Percy Adlon. In October 2008, she creates Enamorados Anonimos, a musical played for seven months at the Movistar Theatre, in the Gran Via in Madrid. In July 2009, she choreographs Am Anfang by Anselm Kiefer at Opéra Bastille, a special event for the departure of Gerard Mortier as director. Blanca Li choreographs Quel Cirque! (What a circus!) in January 2010, a short piece (25 mn) for the Collective Jeu de Jambes, pioneer of jazz-rock in France, commissioned by Festival Suresnes Cités Danse.

In March 2010, she directs and choreographs the opera Treemonisha (by Scott Joplin) at the Théâtre du Châtelet in Paris. In June 2010, she stages in Spain two operas of the contemporary composer Luis de Pablo, Very Gentle and Un parque (Teatros del Canal, Madrid).

In the field of visual arts and multimedia, Blanca Li is invited by the MUSAC, Contemporary Art Museum of Castilla y Leon, for her first exhibition "Te voy a enseñar a bailar" ("I’ll teach you how to dance") (from January 26 to May 4, 2008).

As part of the Noche en Blanco (White Night) to Madrid, in September 2009, Blanca Li designs "Ven a bailar conmigo" ("Come dance with me"), an audiovisual and interactive installation, with tens of thousands of people dancing in the streets of the Spanish capital. The French edition of "la Fête de la Danse de Blanca Li" ("The Dance Fest") becomes a major popular event at the Grand Palais in Paris, in September 2011 with more than 15 000 participants, and is later commissioned by Guggenheim Museum Bilbao in 2012 and Odyssud in Toulouse in 2013.

She stages numerous fashion shows and events for Stella McCartney, Hermès, Jean-Paul Gaultier, H&M, Target, Just One Eye and many others in Paris, London, New York City, Los Angeles or Shanghai.

== Film, advertising, and music videos ==
From the beginning, she extends her activity by participating as a choreographer to the movie industry (French Twist by Josiane Balasko, Dry Cleaning by Anne Fontaine, Mood Indigo by Michel Gondry, I'm So Excited by Pedro Almodóvar, to advertising (Perrier, Gap, Jean-Paul Gaultier, Prada, Lancôme, Longchamp, Beyoncé, H&M, Kookai, Kenzo) or to music videos (Daft Punk's Around the World, Blur's "Music Is My Radar", Rita Mitsouko, Goldfrapp, Kanye West, Paul McCartney, Coldplay True Love...) She writes a script and shoots her first short film: Angoisse (4 "Best Film" Awards). She directs numerous audiovisual works and humorous short films (And so on, la Paella, Un après-midi, Sandance, Home Fitness). She directs the adaptation of her choreographic work, Al Andalús for Arte TV Channel in 2002.

Blanca Li's first feature film, The Challenge (Le Défi), a hip hop musical comedy featuring Sofia Boutella, Amanda Lear and 150 dancers, is released in May 2002. Box office: 300 000 spectators in France and continued showing for 4 months (director, choreographer, dancer and actress: Blanca Li). In May 2004, this film is selected by the Tribeca Film Festival in New York City.

In 2009, she confirms her presence on the screen with one of the main roles of the film by Danièle Thompson, Change of Plans. Also in 2009, she directs For Her (Pour Elle), a short film with Victoria Abril for the series X Femmes (Season 2), broadcast by Canal Plus. Her second feature film as a director, Step by Step (Pas à Pas), is a documentary about the creative process of Corazon loco (theatrical release in France in January 2010). She directs the TV filmings of her shows Elektro Kif and Robot in 2013 for France Television.

Her feature film Robot, director's cut world premieres at the Lincoln Center Film Society “Dance on Camera Festival” in New York City on February 2, 2015.

Her fifth feature film as a director, Elektro Mathematrix, a musical adapted from her show Elektro Kif is shot in a Paris high school in 2014.

== Awards and distinctions ==
From September 2006 to 2010, Blanca Li was the artistic director of CAD (Andalusian Center of Dance), a government institute for professional dancers in Seville. She creates a hip hop section and a program about Escuela Bolera, a unique traditional genre almost disappearing at that time in Spain.

She receives the distinctions of Officer de la Légion d'Honneur from the French president François Hollande in 2014, Officer in Ordre des Arts et des Lettres (2007) from the French Ministry of Culture and Chevalier of the Ordre national du Mérite (2004) from the French Ministry of European Affairs.

In Spain, she receives from the King of Spain the 2009 Gold Medal of Fine Arts, a distinction for 20 major figures in arts and culture. In 2004 the Manuel de Falla Prize is offered in recognition of her contribution to contemporary choreography and her professional career. And in 2013 she gets her entry in the popular French dictionary Petit Larousse.

On April 24, 2019, she gets elected to the French Académie des Beaux Arts, as one of three permanent members of the newly created choreography department.

On October 15, 2019, she is nominated artistic director of los Teatros del Canal in Madrid, Spain.

== Repertory of Blanca Li Dance Company ==
- Nana et Lila (1993) Trans Europe Express Festival (Berlin) and Avignon Off. "Public OFF" award: Best dance show at the Avignon Festival.
- Central Station (1994)
- Salomé (1995) Le Quartz, Brest.
- Stress (1997) Jean Vilar Theatre, Suresnes.
- Le Songe du Minotaure (1998) Dance biennial, Lyon.
- Macadam Macadam (1999) Suresnes Cité Dance Festival. (Recreated in 2006, at the Mogador Theatre, Paris). "Cristal Globe" of the "Best Show" in the Opera/Dance category France.
- Zap! Zap! Zap! (1999) (One Woman Show). Maison de la Musique, Nanterre and National Theatre of Chaillot, Paris. Performed at France Moves Festival at The Kitchen, New York City in 2001 (USA)
- Borderline (2002) Maison des Arts et de la Culture, Créteil.
- Al Andalus (2004) Three parts ballet (Nana, Canciones Populares, l'Amour Sorcier). Massy Opera and the International Festival of Granada.
- Alarme (2004) International dance biennial, Lyon.
- Corazon Loco (2007). Odyssud (Blagnac) and Théâtre national de Chaillot, Paris.
- Poeta en Nueva York (2007). Generalife Theatre, the Alhambra Gardens (Lorca and Granada Program) Ministry of Culture of Andalucia, Spain. Awards and distinctions: "Premios Max de las Artes Escenicas" for the Best Choreography. "Chivas Télon", "Ideal de Granada" and "Imagen" of the City of Granada.
- Le Jardin des Délices (2009) inspired by a painting by Hieronymus Bosch. Montpellier Dance Festival.
- Elektro Kif (2011) for 8 "electro" dancers. The Avant-Seine, Colombes.
- Robot (2013) for 8 dancers and robots. With NAO and Maywa Denki musical automats. Montpellier Dance Festival 2013.

== Selected filmography as film director ==
=== Fiction ===
- Angoisse (1997) Short film (Première Heure, shot in 35 mm, 5 min). Won the Audience Award and Special Mention from the Jury Members of the 14th Brest European Short Film Festival (France), the Fuji Film Award of the 22nd Short Festival of Grenoble (France), and the Best French Short Film Award at the Women Films Festival of Créteil (France).
- La paella (2000) Short film with Blanca Li and Lola Mercier (7 min).
- Le Défi (Dance Challenge).(2002) Feature film with Blanca Li, Amanda Lear, Sofia Boutella, Benji Chaouat and 100 hip hop dancers. Hip hop musical written, choreographed and directed by Blanca Li. (SPI 35 mm, 1h34 length). Won the Audience Award at the Toronto International Film Festival (Canada), selected at Tribeca Film Festival in New York 2004.
- The Chicken (2002) Short film with Blanca Li (2 min).
- Home Fitness (2007) Short film with Blanca Li, Rafa Liñares (MUSAC Léon, 3 min).
- Pour Elle (2009) Short film with Victoria Abril, Canal Plus série X Femmes (2009), Season 2, Episode 2. 23 min).
- Feathers (2014) Short film for John Nollet collection of Hair design. (Calentito, 3 min)
- Elektro Mathematrix (2015) Feature musical adapted from Elektro Kif stage show. (Film Addict, 82 min)
- BlancaLi360 (2015) Experimental short artistic film for 360° vision devices (Oculus Rift). (Premiere Heure, 10 min)

=== Documentaries ===
- Al Andalús (2006) Choreography filmed for ARTE (French TV channel); choreographed, staged and directed by Blanca Li (Les Films d'Ici, 26 min).
- Pas à pas (2009) Documentary directed by Blanca Li about the gestation period and the creation of Corazon Loco spectacle . Released in January 2010 (production Film Addict, 1h 30).
- Elektrokif (2013) Choreography filmed for FRANCE O (French TV channel); choreographed, staged and directed by Blanca Li (Premiere Heure, 70 min).
- Robot (2013) Choreography filmed for FRANCE 2 (French TV channel); choreographed, staged and directed by Blanca Li (Premiere Heure, 90 min).
- Robot Director's cut version (2014) to premiere at Lincoln Center Film Society (Premiere Heure, 61 min)
