= Catherine Furet =

French architect and educator (born 1954)

Catherine Furet (born 17 November 1954) is a French architect and educator. She specializes in public housing.

Born in Mulhouse, she graduated from the École nationale supérieure d'architecture de Versailles in 1980. Furet continued her studies, receiving a Master of Advanced Studies in history from the School for Advanced Studies in the Social Sciences and spent two years at the Villa Medici thanks to a grant from the French Academy in Rome. In 1985, she established her own agency. She has also taught at the École nationale supérieure d'architecture de Versailles, at the École nationale supérieure d'architecture de Clermont-Ferrand and at the École Nationale Supérieure d'Architecture de Paris-Belleville.

In 1984, she published Architectures sans titre.

In 1990, Furet was awarded the Palmarès National de l'Habitat. She was named a Chevalier in the French Legion of Honour in 2000.
