= Descours =

Descours is a French surname. Notable people with the surname include:

- Cyril Descours (born 1983), French actor
- Jean-Pierre Pranlas-Descours (born 1956), French architect and urban planner
