= Lucy Orta =

English artist (born 1966)

- Born: 1966 (age 59–60); Sutton Coldfield, Warwickshire, England
- Known for: Visual Art
- Awards: United Nations Environment Programme Green Leaf Award for Sculpture (2007)

Lucy Orta (born 1966 in Sutton Coldfield, Great Britain) is an English contemporary visual artist living and working between London and Paris where she has resided since 1991.

After graduating with an honours degree in fashion-knitwear design, Orta began practising as a visual artist in 1991. Her sculptural work investigates the boundaries between the body and architecture, exploring their common social factors such as communication and identity. Orta's most emblematic works include: Refuge Wear and Body Architecture (1992–1998), portable architecture, lightweight and autonomous structures representing issues of survival. Nexus Architecture (1994–2002) are participative interventions in which a variable number of people wear suits connected to each other, shaping modular and collective structures, which visualise the concept of social link. Urban Life Guards (2004–ongoing) are wearable objects that reflect on the body as a metaphorical supportive structure.

Orta’s work has been the focus of major survey exhibitions at the Wiener Secession Vienna (1999); USF Contemporary Art Museum, Tampa (2001), for which she received the Andy Warhol Foundation grant; and Barbican Art Gallery, London (2005). She has participated in international art biennales in Venice, Italy; Havana, Cuba; Johannesburg, South Africa; Athens, Greece; and the Gwangju Biennale in Gwangju, South Korea and was an invited speaker at TED x WWF in 2013.

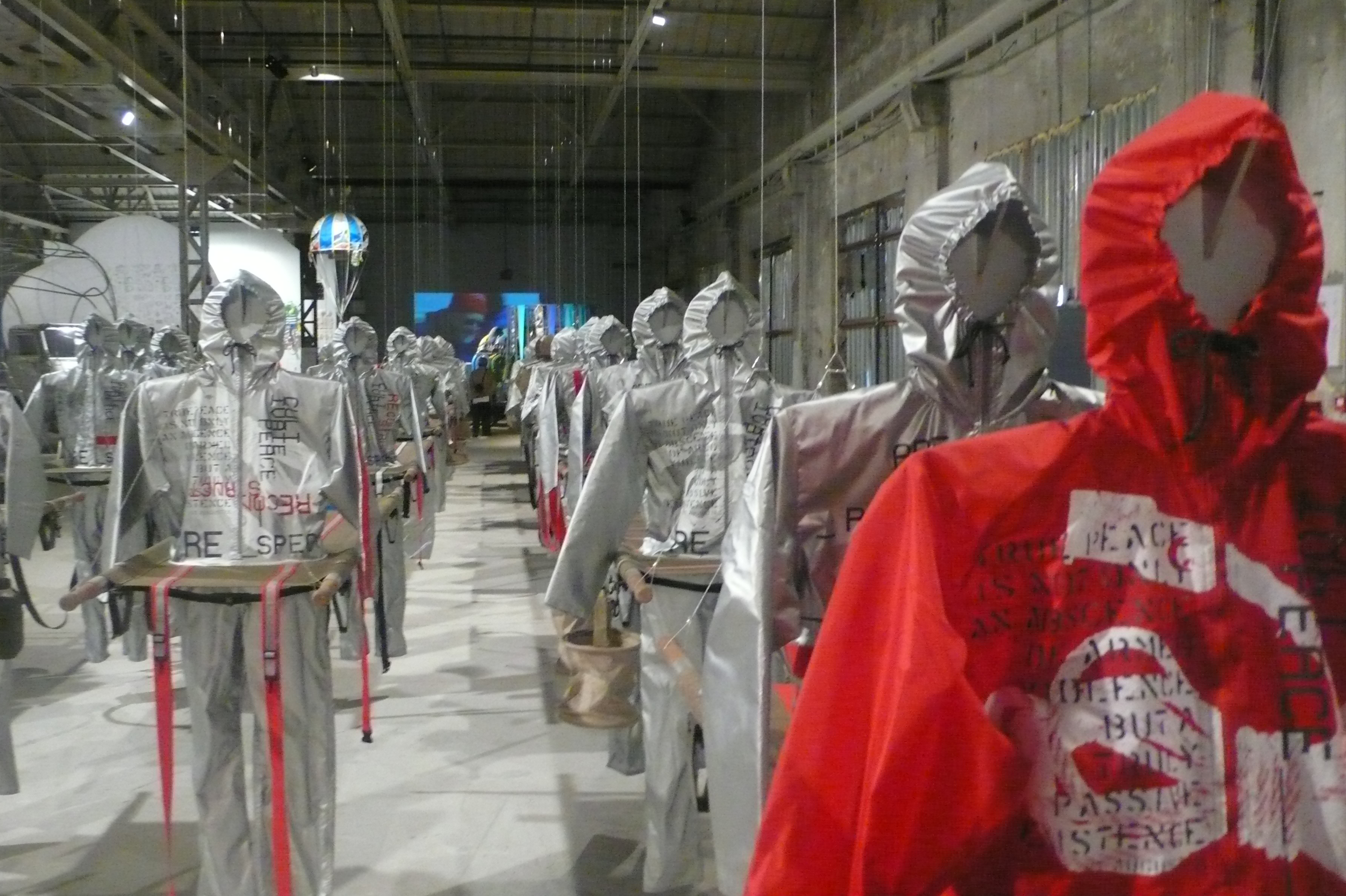
Part of Lucy and Jorge Orta's Antarctica exhibition

In 1993, Orta founded Les Moulins together with her partner Jorge Orta, member of the scientific council of the École Nationale Supérieure d'Architecture de Versailles -ENSAV- with whom she now collaborates. Their major artworks include: Connector, OrtaWater, 70 x 7 The Meal, Antarctica, and Spirits. Lucy and Jorge Orta are currently restoring a complex of artist studios and residencies on former industrial buildings sites situated along the Grand Morin river in Marne La Vallée as a living extension of their practice: “The staging of a social bond ”( Pierre Restany, Process of Transformation. Ed. JM Place Paris 1996). Their collaborative work. which often deals with environmental sustainability and urgent humanitarian crises, has been the focus of major exhibitions at the Fondazione Bevilacqua La Masa Venice, Italy (2005); Museum Boijmans Van Beuningen, Rotterdam (2006); Galleria Continua, San Gimignano/ Beijing / Le Moulin (2007); Biennale del fin del Mundo, Antarctica (2007); Hangar Bicocca spazio d'arte, Milan (2008), Natural History Museum, London (2010); Shanghai Biennale (2012); MAXXI – National Museum of the 21st Century Arts, Rome (2012); Yorkshire Sculpture Park, Wakefield (2013); and Parc de la Villette, Paris (2014). In 2013 they were awarded the inaugural Terrace Wires commission in London, with the monumental artwork Meteoros.

In 2007 Lucy and Jorge Orta received the Green Leaf Award for Sculpture, for artistic excellence with an environmental message, presented by the United Nations Environment Programme in partnership with the Natural World Museum, at the Nobel Peace Centre Oslo, Norway.

Orta holds a BA (hons) and an honorary Master of Fine Arts both from the School of Art and Design at Nottingham Trent University. She is currently Chair of Art and the Environment at University of the Arts London. Orta was the inaugural Rootstein Hopkins Chair at London College of Fashion from 2002 to 2007, and former head of the Man & Humanity Master in Industrial Design for the Design Academy Eindhoven, a pioneering master program that stimulates socially driven and sustainable design solutions, alternative systems and products, which she co-founded in 2002.

== Bibliography ==
- Potential Architecture (2013) ISBN 978-8862082907
- Clouds | Nuages (2012) ISBN 978-8862082167
- Lucy + Jorge Orta: Food Water Life (2011) ISBN 978-1568989914
- Light Works: Lucy + Jorge Orta (2010) ISBN 978-1907317040
- Mapping the Invisible: EU-Roma Gypsies (2010) ISBN 978-1906155919
- Antarctica, Lucy + Jorge Orta (2008) ISBN 978-88-370-6087-9
- Lucy + Jorge Orta Pattern Book, an introduction to collaborative practices (2007) ISBN 1904772757 / 13-978-1-904772-75-0
- Collective Space, Lucy + Jorge Orta (2006) ISBN 1-873352-34-4
- Drink Water! Lucy and Jorge Orta (2005) ISBN 88-7336-169-2
- Lucy Orta, Phaidon Contemporary Artist Series (2003) ISBN 0-7148-4300-8
- Body Architecture, Lucy Orta (2003) ISBN 3-88960-066-2
- Process of Transformation, Lucy Orta (1999) ISBN 978-2-85893-402-7
- Refuge Wear, Lucy Orta (1996) ISBN 978-2-85893-272-6
