= Antoine Picon =

French Architect

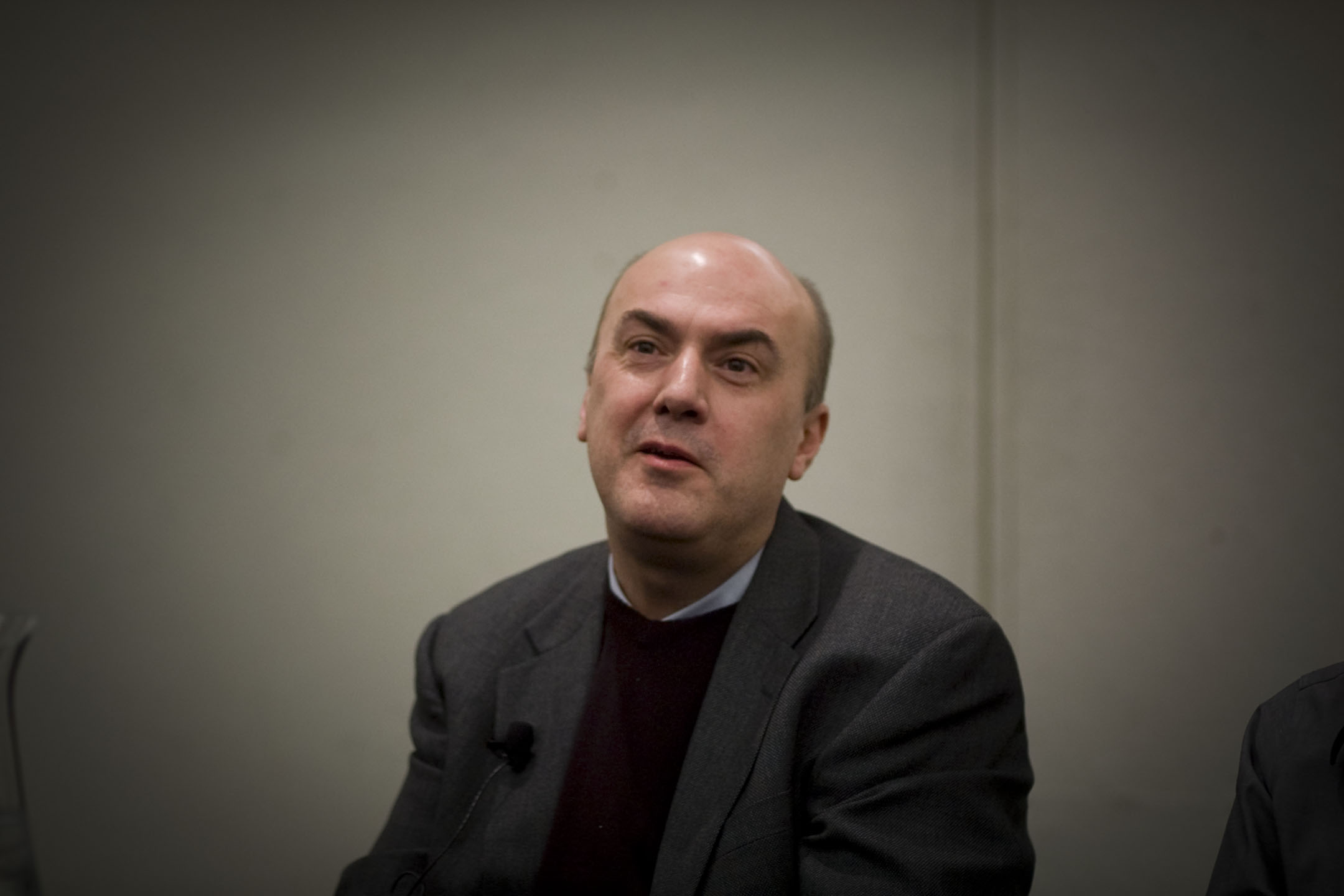
Antoine Picon in 2009

Antoine (Maurice Joseph Charles) Picon (born 8 March 1957) is a 20th-/21st-century French professor of the History of Architecture and technology and co-director of Doctoral Programs (PhD & DDes) at the Harvard Graduate School of Design. He teaches courses in the history and theory of architecture and technology. He is member of the scientific committee of the École Nationale Supérieure d'Architecture de Versailles (ENSAV).

== Career ==
Picon graduated from the École Polytechnique in 1979 and the Ecole Nationale des Ponts et Chaussées in 1981. Architect DPLG in 1984 and Doctor in History of School for Advanced Studies in the Social Sciences, with honors in 1991. He was a public servant with the grade of General Engineer of Roads and Bridges.

From 1981 to 1984 he was a Special Advisor to the Office of the Ministry of Architectural Research Equipment. He was a researcher from 1984 until 1994 when he became director of research at the National School of Bridges and Roads. He held this position until 1997, when his title was changed to professor.

In 2002 he took up the position of Professor of the History of Architecture and Technology at the Harvard Graduate School of Design. Since 2008 he has also been a researcher at the National School of Bridges and Roads.

== Honors and awards ==
Picon has received a number of awards in France for his writings, including the Medaille de la Ville de Paris and twice the Prix du Livre d'Architecture de la ville de Briey.

He is chairman of the Fondation Le Corbusier.

He is Chevalier des Arts et Lettres since 2014 in recognition of his significant contributions to the arts, literature, or the propagation of these fields.

== Works ==
Trained as an engineer, architect, and historian of science and art, Picon has published extensively on the history of architectural and urban technologies from the 18th century to the present.

- 2023 Atlas of the Senseable City, Yale University Press
- 2021 The Materiality of Architecture, University Of Minnesota Press
- 2015 Smart Cities : a spatialised Intelligence, Wiley
- 2013 Smart Cities : Théorie et critique d'un idéal auto-réalisateur, Paris Editions B2
- 2013 Ornament: The Politics of Architecture and Subjectivity, Wiley
- 2010 Digital Culture in Architecture: An Introduction for the Design Profession, Birkhäuser Architecture
- 2007 Marc Mimram architect-engineer : hybrid, Gollion: Infolio
- 2006 Tra utopia e ruggine. Paesaggi dell'ingegneria dal settecento a oggi, Alberto Allemandi & C
- 2003 Dictionnaire de Utopies, Larousse (co-authors Michèle Riot-Sarcey, Thomas Bouchet)
- 2003 Architecture and the sciences : exchanging metaphors, Princeton Architectural Press
- 2002 Les Saint-Simoniens: Raison, Imaginaire, et Utopie, Paris, Belin
- 1999 Le dessus des cartes/un atlas parisien, Pavillon de l'Arsenal, Picard
- 1999 L'aventure du balnéaire : la grande motte de Jean Balladur, Editions Parentheses, Marseilles (co author Claude Prelorenzo)
- 1998 La ville territoiire des cyborgs, Les Éditions de L'Imprimeur
- 1997 L'art de l'ingénieur : constructeur, entrepreneur, inventeur, Centre George Pompidou
- 1996 La Ville et la Guerre, Les Éditions de L'Imprimeur
- 1992 L'Invention de l'Ingénieur Moderne, L'Ecole des Ponts et Chaussées 1747-1851, Ecole des Ponts et Chausses
- 1992 French Architects and Engineers in the Age of Enlightenment, Cambridge University Press
- 1989 L'ingénieur artiste : dessins anciens de l'école des ponts et chaussées, Presses de l'Ecole nationale des ponts et Chaussées (co author Michel Yvon)
- 1988 Claude Perrault (1613-1688) ou la Curiosité d'un classique, Picard
- 1988 Les architectes et les ingénieurs français dans le Siècle des Lumières, Presses de l'École nationale des ponts et chaussées

Picon has also published numerous articles, mostly dealing with the complementary histories of architecture and technology.
