= Anne Démians =

French architect

Anne Démians d'Archimbaud
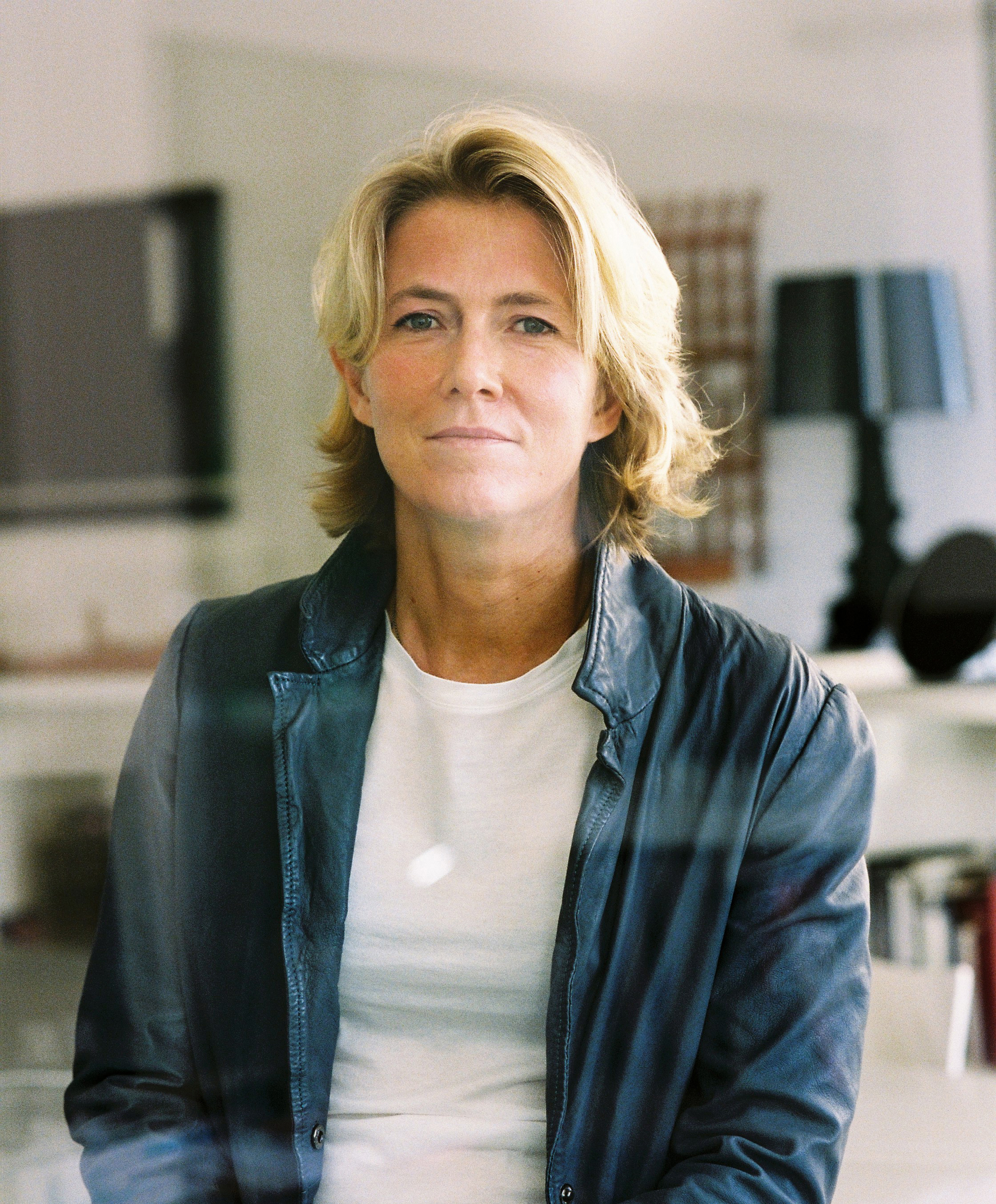
- Born: Colmar, France
- Education: École nationale supérieure d'architecture de Versailles
- Notable work: Quai Ouest, ESPCI Nobel School, Douai law courts, hotel and tourism high school of Guyancourt
- Website: www.annedemians.com

Anne Démians d'Archimbaud is a French architect who opened her first agency in 1995. In 2003, she established Architectures Anne Démians in Montreuil, near Paris. The agency has designed office buildings, a freight station, school kitchens and several residential developments.

== Biography ==
Born in Colmar, Démians studied architecture at the École nationale supérieure d'architecture de Versailles, graduating in 1987.

Her mixed-use Quai Ouest project in the centre of Nancy has attracted considerable attention. Completed in 2015, the 10,000 m^{2} (110,000 sq ft) building with 640 oblong windows houses offices, a hotel and a number of stores.

In May 2015, Démians won the competition for renovating the ESPCI ParisTech and converting it into a major research centre. Her design includes 38,000 m^{2} (410,000 sq ft) of additional space, mainly for laboratories.

Since 1998, Démians has taught at the schools of architecture in Brittany, Paris and Berlin. In 2015, she became a member of the Académie d'architecture founded in 1953, open to those who have made major contributions to architecture and urban planning.

== Selected projects ==
Anne Démians' recent projects include:

- 2006: Central kitchen for the Caisse des écoles, Paris, completed 2012
- 2009: Luxury housing, Batignolles, Paris
- 2010: Winner of competition for 350 housing units in Auteuil
- 2010: Winner of competition for a speculative office building in Batignolles
- 2011: Building in Nancy with housing units, student residence and shops
- 2011: Winner of restricted competition for Société Générale's head office in Fontenay-sous-Bois
- 2012: Winner of competition for three tower blocks in Strasbourg

== Literature ==
- Leloup, Michèle (2011). Auteuil, ou l'architecture d'une confidence: Anne Démians, Finn Geipel, Francis Soler et Rudy Ricciotti. Archibooks + Sautereau. ISBN 978-2-35733-175-4.
