= Philippe Rahm =

Swiss-born French architect and educator

Philippe Rahm (born 1967) is a Swiss-born architect and educator. He is the principal architect in the office of Philippe Rahm architectes, based in Paris, France. His work, which extends the field of architecture from the physiological scale of the body to the climatic scale of the city has received an international audience in the context of sustainability.

== Biography ==
Dipl. EPFL 1993 - Ecole Polytechnique Fédérale de Lausanne - Switzerland.

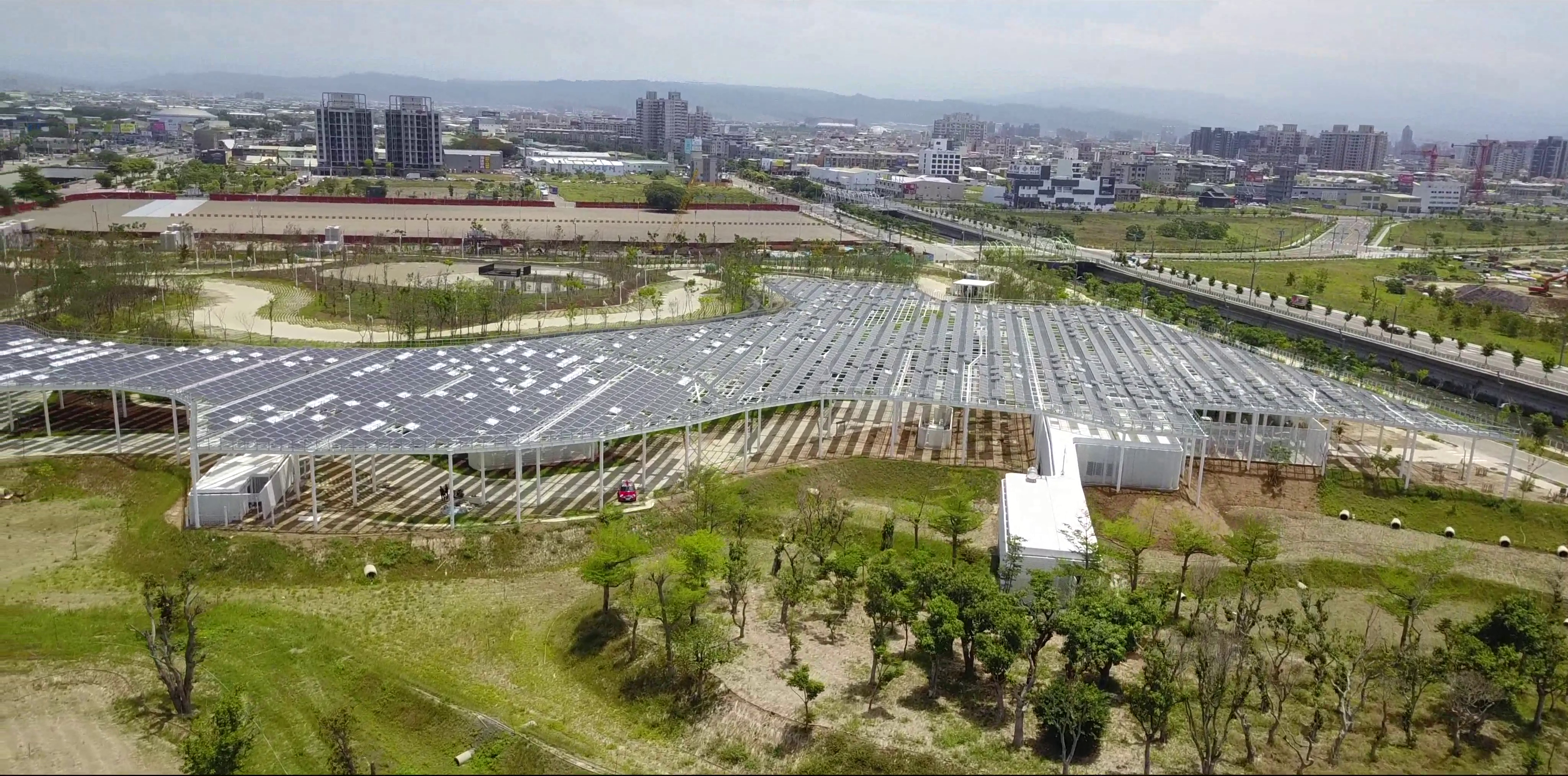
Central Park, Taichung, Taiwan, 2011-2019

In 2002, Rahm was chosen to represent Switzerland at the 8th Architectural Venice Biennale in Italy. He was also one of twenty international architects selected for the 2008 Venice Biennale, which was curated by Aaron Betsky and participates to the 19th International Architecture Exhibition of the Venice Biennial directed by Carlo Ratti in 2025.

He has participated in a number of exhibitions worldwide, including (Archilab, Orléans, France 2000; SF-MoMA 2001; CCA Kitakyushu 2004; Centre Pompidou, Paris, 2003–2006, 2007, 2009-2010 and 2012-2014 in the museum's permanent collections; Manifesta 7, 2008; Louisiana museum, Denmark, 2009; Guggenheim Museum, New-York 2010). In 2007, he had a personal exhibition at the Canadian Centre for Architecture in Montreal. Mr. Rahm was a resident at the Villa Medici in Rome (2000). Since 2005, he has been a member of the Artistic Council of the Foundation Prince Pierre in Monaco. He has lectured widely, including at Cooper Union, Harvard School of Design, Bartlett School of Architecture UCL, UCLA and the ETH Zürich. He has worked on several private and public projects in France, England, Italy, Germany and Taiwan. His work includes in 2010 the project of an office building of 13000 m2 in La Défense in France for the EPADESA; convective apartments for the IBA in Hamburg, Germany; the White geology, a stage design for contemporary art in the Grand-Palais on the Champs-Elysées in Paris in 2009; a studio house for the artist Dominique Gonzalez-Foerster in 2008 and the 70 hectares Central Central Park in Taichung, Taiwan (2011-2020) with mosbach paysagistes and Ricky Liu & Associates. In 2025, Philippe Rahm is co-curator of the Biennial of architecture and landscape of Île-de-France and the Saint-Étienne International Design Biennial.

== Academic experience ==
He was Headmaster at the AA School of Architecture in London in 2005-2006, visiting professor in Mendrisio Academy of Architecture in Switzerland in 2004 and 2005, at the ETH Lausanne in 2006 and 2007, at the School of Architecture of the Royal Danish Academy of Fine Arts of Copenhagen in 2009-2010, in Oslo at the AHO in 2010-2011. He was visiting professor at School of Architecture of Princeton University, USA, from 2011 to 2013. In the Fall 2011 semester, Philippe was the Michale Fellow at the University at Buffalo - State University of New York.He was a visiting professor in BiArch (Barcelona Institute Of Architecture) for 2011-12 MBiArch program. He taught Architectural design at the Graduate School of Design in Harvard from 2014 to 2016 and at Cornell University AAP from 2018 to 2020.

Since 2023, Philippe is Dean’s Visiting Associate Professor at GSAPP, Columbia University in the City of New York. He is a tenured teacher for architectural design and theory at the ENSAV, national school of architecture of Versailles in France and at the HEAD-Genève.

== Awards ==
In 2011, Rahm won the international competition with mosbach paysagistes for the Jade Eco Park, a 70 hectares park in Taichung, Taiwan, which opened to the public in December 2020. In 2019, together with OMA, he won the urban planning competition for Farini (44 hectares) and San Cristoforo (15 hectares) in Milan.

Year	Award	Result	Organization	Ref
2017	Order of Cultural Merit	Insignia of Knight	Principality of Monaco	
2019	Prix d'Architecture	Silver Medal	Académie d'architecture (France)	
2016	Design Award, Best Bright Ideas, ‘Spectral Light’	Won	Wallpaper*	
2003	Architecture	Won	Swiss Art Awards	
2008	Iakov Chernikhov Prize	Top ten	ICIF (Russia)	
2009	Ordos Prize	Nominated	City of Ordos (China)	
2009	Carte blanche VIA grant	Won	Industries Françaises de l’Ameublement, France	
2010	Iakov Chernikhov Prize	Nominated	ICIF (Russia)	
