= X Femmes =

French television series

X Femmes (English: X Women) is a French television series of short films shown on Canal+ in 2008–2009. They were shot by female directors with the goal of producing erotica, soft-core pornography and hard-core pornography from a female point of view.

== Episodes ==
Season 1 – Original air date 25 October 2008

1. Le bijou indiscret (The indiscreet jewel). Director: Arielle Dombasle. Stars: Arielle Dombasle, Jérémie Elkaïm and Paz de la Huerta
2. Se faire prendre au jeu (Getting into the game). Director: Lola Doillon. Stars: Laureen Langendorff and Dominique Viger
3. Peep show heros (Peep show heroes). Director: Helena Noguerra. Stars: Axelle Parker, William and Myke Glory
4. Enculées (Doggy fucked). Director: Laetitia Masson. Stars: Hélène Fillières, Valentine Catzéflis and Camille de Sablet
5. Vous désirez? (You want?). Director: Caroline Loeb. Stars: Alexandra, Béa and Pierre Blanche
6. À ses pieds (At her feet). Director: Mélanie Laurent. Stars: Fanny Krish, Marc Ruchmann, Lou Charmelle and Déborah Révy

Season 2 – Original air date 27 June 2009

1. Samedi soir (Saturday night). Director: Zoe Cassavetes. Stars: Alexandre Marouani and Laëtizia Venezia Tarnowska
2. Pour elle (For her). Director: Blanca Li. Stars: Victoria Abril
3. Le beau sexe (The fairer sex). Director: Tonie Marshall. Stars: Miko Angelo, Philippe Elkoubi and Marie Pape
4. Les filles (Girls). Director: Anna Mouglalis

== See also ==
- List of French television series
