= François Roche =

French architect

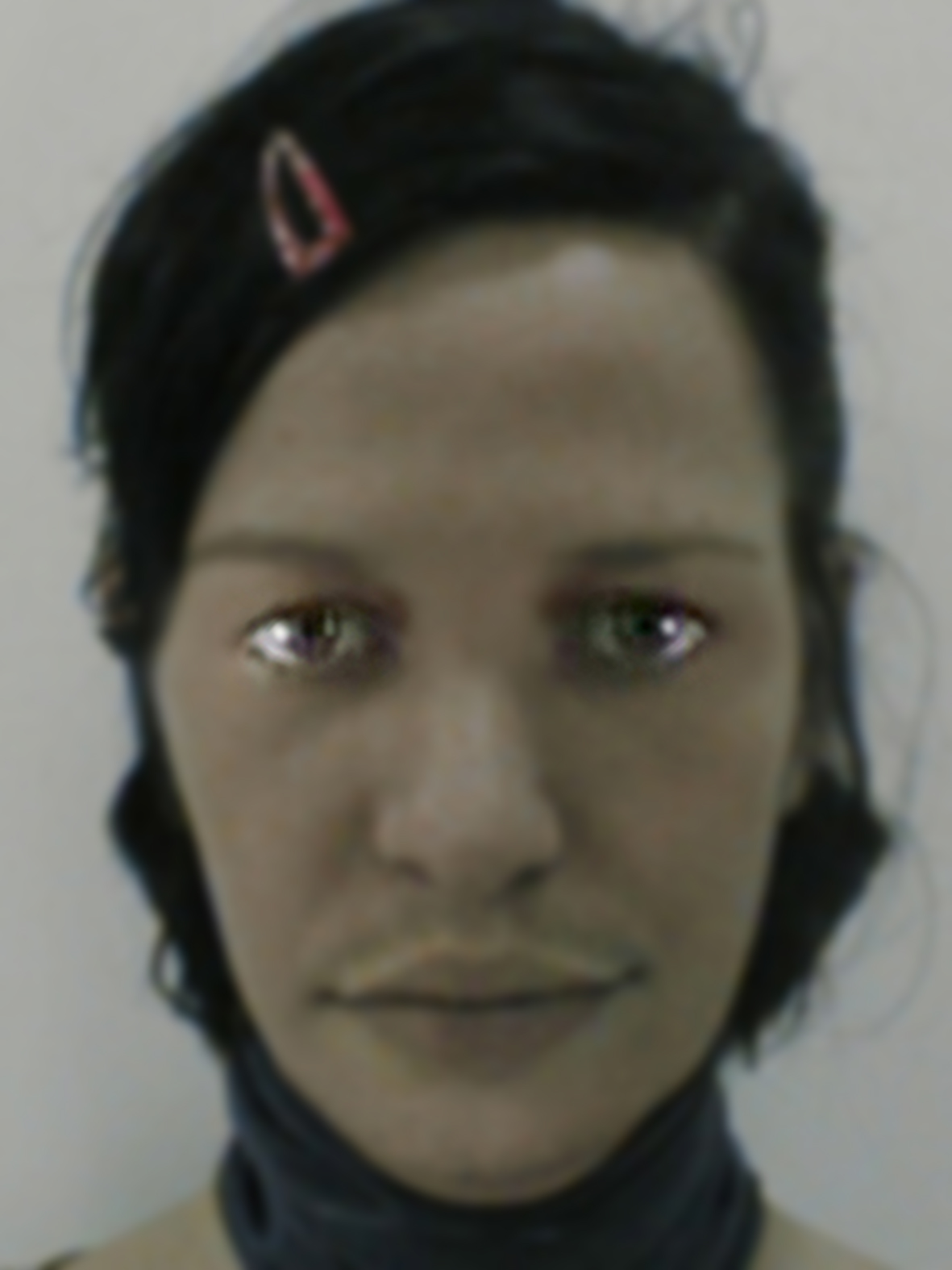
- s/he, the avatar that represents François Roche and his work
- Born: 1961 (age 64–65); Paris, France
- Education: École nationale supérieure d'architecture de Versailles
- Occupation: Architect
- Practice: R&Sie(n) Architects; New Territories/M4
- Website: www.new-territories.com

François Roche (born 1961) is a French architect. Roche is the co-founder and director of R&Sie(n) Architects from the research architectural firm, New Territories/M4 (mindmachinemakingmyths).

== Early life and education ==
François Roche was born in 1961 in Paris, France. Roche studied science and math at University, but, decided in 1981 to switch his degree to architecture. His interest in the sciences would go on to influence his architectural work. He spent time in the Algerian desert during his time in college, deciding whether he wanted to complete his degree in architecture. In 1987, he graduated from the École nationale supérieure d'architecture de Versailles.

== Career ==
Roche founded his first studio in Paris in 1989. He expanded to incorporate in 1994, after his first solo show "Action" at IFA (Institut Francais d'Architecture), following this manifesto Stephanie Lavaux joined him as a partner (until 2011), naming the studio R&Sie(n), the "R" in the name is for Roche, the "S" is for Stephanie, and is pronounced similarly to the word "heresy" in French, but also "RSI" in reference to Real Symbolic Imaginary of J. Lacan. The studio specializes in architectural "investigations" and "scenarios" with the goal of connecting the relationship between humans and buildings. Roche would go on to create New Territories/M4, which houses R&Sie, along with other installation, architectural, and digital design projects, with partner Camille Lacadée.

Since the 1990s, Roche has been represented by an androgynous, digitally created avatar named s/he. Roche describes s/he as "a kind of doppelgänger, a Siamese twin, the mask of Mishima, an avatar of Vishnu. Androgynous in appearance and with a queer attitude, s/he has enabled me for twenty-five years to maintain a singular voice, coming from nowhere, emerging from territories that abandoned the posture of authority, of discourse, and of academia."

In 2004, R&Sie(n) created DustyRelief for the Museum of Contemporary Art, Bangkok, Thailand. The piece was designed to absorb the city smog, which would then cause the structure to grow. The piece was inspired by Man Ray's Dust Breeding. The project was canceled due to a coup d'état.

While speaking in at an event in London in 2010, Roche shared that he would be "happy" if somebody went into one of his buildings or designs, got lost, and abandons need of exit, in reference to S. Brussolo novel (Trajets et Itineraires de l'oubli, 1981). That same year, Roche ended his professional relationship with Lavaux and began working with Camille Lacadée. In 2011, the avatar used to represent the R&Sie(n) committed "suicide" only to re-emerge in 2017, to perform his-her first solo retrospective at Frac Orléans. Around 2013, Roche opened a studio in the Talat Noi neighborhood of Bangkok. Before relocating from Paris to Bangkok, Roche transformed his Paris house in a project called I'm Lost in Paris. The project involved cultivating bacteria which turned into vegetation covering the house.

Roche and Lacadée launched a Kickstarter to raise funds to an "experimental hybrid building" called MMYST. The project was to be built by robots in Thailand. In May 2015, Roche, Lacadée, and Pierre Huyghe to create "What Could Happen," an "experimental euthanasia expedition" in the Swiss Alps. In October 2015, he lectured with Lacadée at the University of Michigan's Taubman College. That same month, Roche and Lacadée exhibited #mythomaniaS at the Chicago Architecture Biennial. The exhibit included videos of "architectural scenarios" around the world. Roche's professional partnership with Lacadée ended in 2015. Since 2018 Roche is sharing multiple Works, Events, Films, Biennales (Sydney, Bangkok and Venice...) with Mika Tamori, Tokyo based Artist.

In 2016, Frac Centre-Val de Loire held a retrospective, titled S/he would rather do fiction maker of Roche's work with New Territories/M4.

Roche's work has been exhibited at Mori Art Museum, Columbia University, the Pompidou Center, the Museum of Modern Art, the Massachusetts Institute of Technology, Yale University and other museums and galleries. Roche has exhibited in the Venice Biennale multiple times, including in 2004's Metamorph International Architecture Exposition; the 2008 International Architecture Exposition in which R&Sie exhibited their "bi[r]o-bo[o]ts"; the 2014 "Time Space Existence: Made in Europe" biennale; and 2018 at the Bembo Pavilion and the Lithuanian Pavilion. Roche has also participated as a panelist at the 2012 United States pavilion. His 2010 installation, Building Which Never Dies, was partially confiscated by Italian police for containing uranium. The incident caused an entire section of the Biennale to be closed for an entire day. In 2025 after 15 years of banishment in central Venice pavilion, New-Territories, fRoche-S/he with Emanuele Coccia and Mika Tamori among others are again in Architecture Biennale 25 _ Arsenale for "Impermanences Tractatus" installation.

=== Themes and concepts in Roche's work ===
Architecture doesn’t mean only to create buildings in the public space, but also to create debate in public space, through building and/or attitudes able to make a building.

— François Roche, 2017

Roche's works often represent the divergence of science, architecture, philosophy, science fiction genetics, art, identity, and biopolitics. However, through the avatar, Roche explores philosophical concepts of the LGBTQI community, communications, and philosophy. In describing his beliefs and work, Roche often cites fiction and non-fiction, ranging from Jacques Lacan to Noam Chomsky to Paul B. Preciado. Roche describes s/he and New Territories as "tool to knot and unknot realities" in the spirit of Michel Foucault.

The Frac Centre-Val de Loire calls Roche's early work as veering "towards hybridization and "hyperlocalism", aimed at distorting reality and bringing out its most significant unusualness." In 1996, Roche started using digital processes to create his work. Roche's later works also incorporate robotics complemented by writing and lectures.

=== Reception ===
Roche has been called an "elusive" architect-artist by The New York Times, a "provocateur" by the Bangkok Post, and "always provocative" by The Architect's Newspaper. The New York Times describes Roche's work as "not buildings exactly, but scientific experiments." In France he has been called an ANARCHITECT in French newspaper Libération.

=== Monographs ===
- 2018 / #digitaldisobediences_s/he would rather do Fiction Maker (Frac-Centre)
- 2015 / mythomaniaS.
- 2014 / Heretical-Machinism.
- 2011 / Architecture des Humeurs. Catalogue on research-exhibition. PDF 2mo
- 2010 / New-Territories-R&Sie(n).
- 2010 / BioReboot.
- 2007 / Fiction Scripts.
- 2006 / Spoiled Climate.
- 2005 / I've heard About.
- 2004 / Corrupted Biotopes.
- 2003 / T(e)en Years After.
- 2000 / Mutation @morphes.
- 1994 / The Shadow of Chameleon.

All monographies/ texts / article are public and free downloadable

=== Academia ===
Roche and S/he were involved in Guest Professor position among other places and chronologically at Bartlett-UCL-London 2000, at UPenn-Philadelphia 2006 and 2015–016, at GSAPP-Columbia-NYC 2006–2017, at USC-Los Angeles 2009–11, at RMIT-Melbourne 2012–2017, and few years at IKA (2017) and Angewante-Vienna (2009), AFAA-Bratislava (2018). He taught 'processes' in 2023 at KHM-Koln but it seems in conflit with its AfD administration, and a permanent member of EGS _ Division of Philosophy, Art and Critical Thought since 2012

=== Notable exhibitions ===
- 1990: Venice Architecture Biennale, French Pavilion "40 architects less than 40 years old"
- 1993: Action, Solo exhibition Institut Francais d'Architecture
- 1999-2000: @namorphous changes, Columbia University (New York), UCLA (Los Angeles)
- 1996: le monolythe fracture, Venice Architecture Biennale, French Pavilion
- 2000: aqua alta 1.0/2.0, Venice Architecture Biennale, International and French Pavilions
- 2001: In any way, it's already happened, ICA, London
- 2002: Biennale Architecture French Pavilion, co-curating with Frac Orleans, position declined for self sabotage and political reason (public letter)
- 2003: Asphalt Spot, Echigo-Tsumari Art Triennial, Niigata Prefecture, Japan
- 2004: metamorph, Venice Architecture Biennale, International Pavilion, Arsenale
- 2004: Frac Collection, Mori Art Museum, Tokyo
- 2004: L’exposition Architectures non standard, Centre Pompidou, Paris, France
- 2005: "I’ve heard about (Modèles de sécrétion)", as New Territories, Musée d'Art Moderne de Paris, Paris, France
- 2006: Frac Centre-Val de Loire, Orléans, France
- 2006: terra incognita, Tate Modern, London, 2006, with Pierre Huyghe
- 2008: Venice Architecture Biennale, International Italian Pavilion,

bi[r]o-bo[o]ts installation

- 2009: radical nature, Barbican, London
- 2009: Lost in Paris, Musée du Quai Branly – Jacques Chirac, Paris, France
- 2009: green building, Louisiana (Denmark, 2009),
- 2010:Venice Architecture Biennale, International Pavilion (@isotropic uranium installation), Entire Arsenale closed for one day as paranoiac reaction, Uranium stone confiscated by police + Austrian Pavilion (teaching studios installation)
- 2010: L’architecture des humeurs, solo exhibition, Le Laboratoire, Paris, France
- 2012: Venice Biennal Architecture, US Pavilion (Critics' Roundtable) + Slovenia Maribor ephemeral pavillon + Co-curating a Dark Side night
- 2014: Venice Biennal Architecture, pavilion Bembo, Time Space Existence: presenting Timidity Symptom, a project related to the contemporary art museum in Bangkok + invitation to a Dark Side night.
- 2015: #mythomaniaS, Chicago Architecture Biennial, Chicago, Illinois
- 2016: S/he would rather do Fiction maker, retrospective, Frac Centre-Val de Loire, Orléans, France
- 2016: Are we human, Istanbul Biennale
- 2018: Venice Biennal Architecture, pavilion Bembo + pavillon Lithuanian + Co-curating a Dark Side night
- 2019: The Arts and the Future, An Architecture in Moods, Mori Art Museum, Tokyo, Japan
- 2020: Escape Routes, FortuneShel(tell)er, Biennale Bangkok,
- 2021: Ecologies and Politics of the Living, Vienna Biennale, Vienna, Austria
- 2022: Rivus, Biennale Sydney,
- 2023: SHIFTING_DRIFTING/mythomaniaS_S/he_New-Territories_2012-2022, lathouse, Zurich, Switzerland
- 2023: La Chambre des Mèmoires-à-Venir _S/he_New-Territories_fR, E.Coccia, M.Tamori, C.Delaporte 'les Mondes Nouveaux', Paris-La-Defense
- 2025: Npermanencies Tractatus, in Arsenale international selection with _S/he_New-Territories_fR, E.Coccia, M.Tamori, Damien Sorrentino and UTS Sydney, marking a notable return after the controversial 2010 uranium incident effectively led to a long absence or banishment from the central exhibition + invitation to a Dark Side night
- 1990‐2025: In total, New-Territories (R&Sie(n) / [eIf/bʌt/c] / M4) has been selected 15 times for participation in the Venice Biennale, in national and international pavilions

=== Notable collections ===
- 2002: Scrambled Flat 2.0, Waterflux, Evolène, Suisse, with R&Sie, Centre Pompidou, Paris, France
- 2003: "Mosquito Bottleneck Project, Trinidad", with R&Sie, SFMOMA, San Francisco, California
- 2003: "R&Sie(n), Water Flux (unbuilt) : Rendering of the structure", Canadian Centre for Architecture, Montreal
- 2005: "I’ve heard about (Modèles de sécrétion)", selected works, as New Territories, Mudam, Luxembourg City, Luxembourg
- 2007: "Heshotmedown, Demilitarized Zone, Korea", with R&Sie, SFMOMA, San Francisco, California
- 2017: Multiples Scenarios with Drawing, Models, Movies, Texts in a donation to Frac Centre, Orléans, at the occasion of retrospective S/he would rather do fiction maker
- 2021: MythomaniaS, acquired by Frac Centre, Orléans, serie of architecture cases studies and movies
- 2018: mind [e] scape, as New Territories, Echigo-Tsumari Art Field, Niigata Prefecture, Japan

== Personal life ==
Roche lives in Bangkok. Roche goes to great lengths to avoid having his photograph published, a concept he has compared to Daft Punk or Margiela.
