= Jean-Pierre Pranlas-Descours =

French architect and urban planner

Jean-Pierre Pranlas-Descours is a French architect and urban planner associated with a minimalist aesthetic.

== Biography ==
Pranlas-Descours received his undergraduate education from the Ecole D’Architecture de Versailles and a Masters in Medieval History from the Ecole des Hautes Etudes en Sciences Sociales, Paris, expanding his exploration in the architectural complex societies of the Medieval cities in Italy. Immediately upon completion, he launched his firm, Pranlas-Descours Architect & Associates (1990 to present) and began teaching at the Ecole D’Architecture de Strasbourg, the Ecole Nationale des Ponts et Chaussée, the Ecole D’Architecture de Rennes, Paris-Tolbiac, École nationale supérieure d'architecture de Paris-La Villette, and is presently, a full professor at the Ecole nationale supérieure d’architecture de Paris-Malaquais. His guest-lecturing has taken him to architectural schools in France, Italy, Spain, the Netherlands, Iceland, Germany, Singapore, Brazil, Peru as well as the United States: Cornell University, Columbia University, and Parson's School of Design. He was visiting professor at the Bernard and Anne Spitzer School of Architecture - City College - New-York.

== Honors and awards ==
In 1986, Pranlas-Descours received the Rome Prize in Architecture from L’Academie de France in Rome. To further his research, the following year he was honored with a residency at the academy's campus, Villa Medici. He was nominated for the Equerre d’Argent Architectural Prize of the AMC Review, 2000, 2003, 2006. In 2004, Pranlas-Descours’ project for the new center of Saint-Jacques-de-La-lande was shortlisted for the European Urban Prize. For his Bottière Chenaie Urban Design, Nantes, he was the recipient for the distinguished Robert Auzelle Prize. In 2012 Pranlas-Descours received the Honor Medaille from the French Academy of Architecture.In 2019 he received the S-Arch International prize and the D'A architectural Prize for the Chambre des Métiers project in Lille, project who was nominated to the Mies Van Der Hohe prize. In 2021 he received the Award Gold prize (Asia -Pacific) from the Holcim Foundation for the Yuzhong project in China. In 2022 he was nominated as a new member of the French Academy of Architecture.

== Selected projects ==
- International urban competition in Barcelona for the extension of the Diagonal avenue (1990) First prize
- Media Library, Rennes (2000)
- Cemetery Pavilion in Saint-Jacques-de-la-Lande (2007)
- Housing projects: Paris (2003 and 2006), Montreuil (2007 and 2008), Pantin (2013), Clamart (2015), Grenoble (2015)
- International Urban Competition for the extension of downtown Reykjavík (2008) First Prize
- International Urban Competition for the extension of the city El Prat de Llobregat, Barcelona (2009) First Prize
- Technical school Nantes (2010)
- Hotel-restaurant, project Sag Harbor, Long Island, New York (2013)
- Office building Lille (2014)
- Urban projects Lille, Nantes, Rennes, Paris, Geneva, Nice, Bordeaux, Versailles (1992–2028)
- Guild Association building in Lille (2009–2019)*
- Church with Alvaro Siza Saint-Jacques-de-la-Lande (2009–2018)
- Parking lot Lille (2014–2016)
- Hospital in Nantes (2014) Competition
- Mixed building—parking lot, sports facility, and offices in Lille (2015–2019)
- Exhibitions of Pranlas-Descours, Architecture Situations: Gallery of Architecture, Paris (2011); Aedes Gallery, Berlin (2012); Burgau Architectural Center, Ulm (2012–2013).

== Publications ==
1. 5 projects (French Academy in Rome,(Villa Médicis, 1988)
2. European architectural Situations, (Villa Médicis, 1989)
3. European Panorama Capitols (Picard, 2000)
4. Metropolitan Archipelo, Paris suburb (Picard, 2003)
5. Pranlas-Descours, Architecture situations (Ante Prima, 2011)
6. Density, Architecture and Territory, 5 European stories (Jovis, Berlin 2016)
7. Pranlas-Descours, The depth of the landscape, ( Jovis, Berlin 2022)
