= Jorge Orta (artist) =

Italian-Argentinian visual artist

- Born: 1953 (age 72–73); Rosario, Santa Fe, Argentina
- Known for: Visual Art
- Awards: United Nations Environment Programme Green Leaf Award for Sculpture (2007)

Jorge Orta (born 1953) is a Paris-based, Italian-Argentinian contemporary visual artist.

Orta began his career as a painter, winning numerous awards for his work. In response to the increasing censorship of the Argentine military regime, he shifted to more avant-garde and alternative forms of visual communication, such as mail art and action-performance, working in underground artist collectives. He was also lecturer in the Faculty of Fine Arts of the Universidad Nacional de Rosario, and a member of the Argentinean national council for scientific research, until 1984, when he received a scholarship to the Sorbonne and relocated to Paris.

In Paris, Orta began experimenting with the technology for large-scale image projection and painted and illuminated sites of cultural and historical significance around the world. In 1993, he founded Les Moulins with his wife Lucy Orta. The pair collaborate as a team known as Lucy + Jorge Orta on major artworks that often explore environmental sustainability and urgent humanitarian crises.

== Early life and education ==
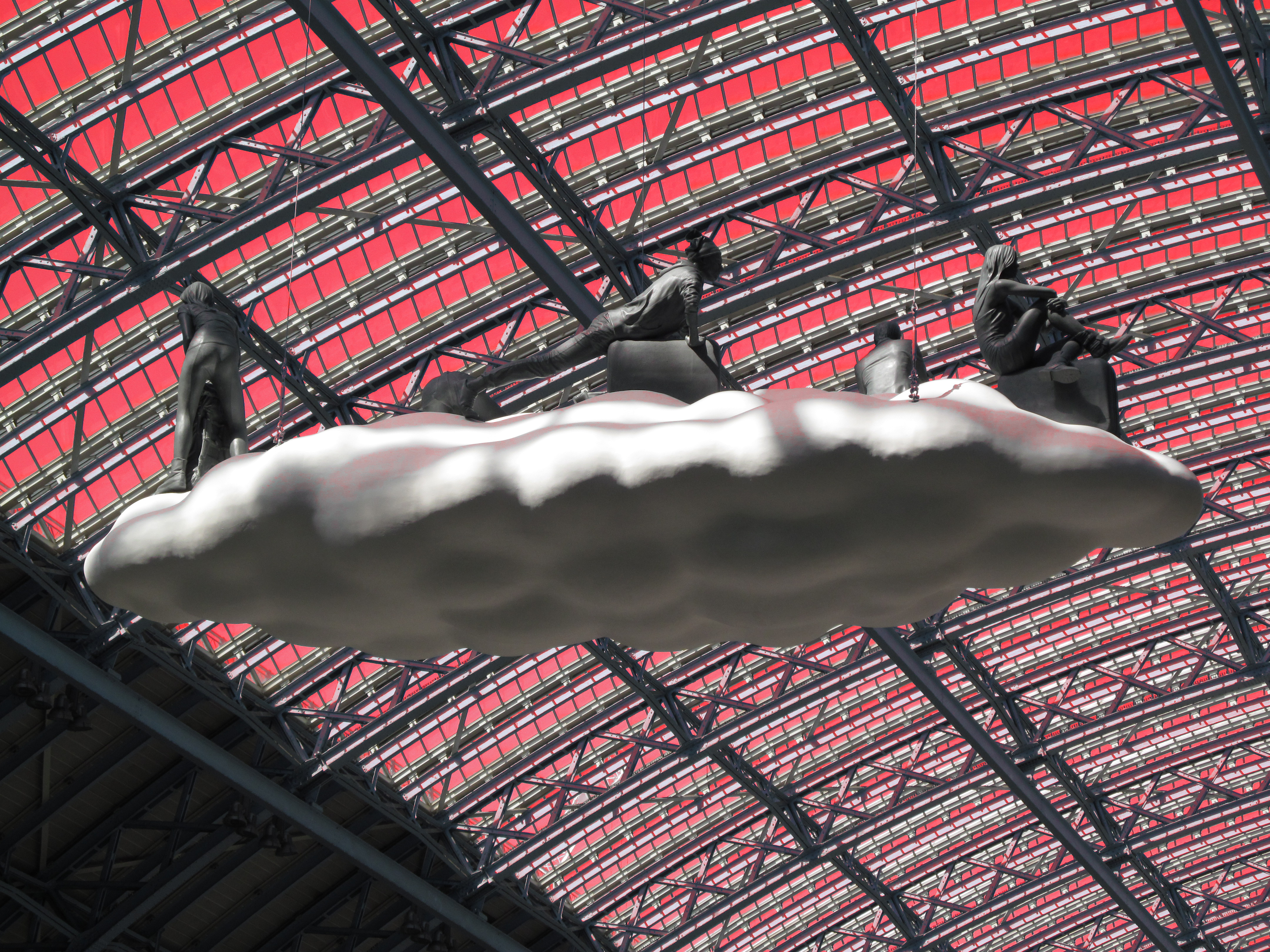
Clouds: Meteoros at London's St Pancras station by Lucy and Jorge Orta

Jorge Orta was born in 1953, in Rosario, Argentina. He was raised in Paris. His father was a civil servant and his mother, a teacher. After graduating simultaneously from the Faculty of Fine Arts and the Faculty of Architecture at the Universidad Nacional de Rosario.

In 1984, Orta received a scholarship from the Argentinian Ministry of Foreign and European Affairs to pursue a D.E.A. (Diplôme d'études approfondies) at the Sorbonne in Paris.

== Career ==
=== Argentina ===
Orta began his career as a painter, winning numerous awards for his work. In response to the increasing censorship of the Argentine military regime, his practice shifted to more avant-garde and alternative forms of visual communication, such as mail art and action-performance, working in underground artist collectives. He was the first Argentine artist to explore video and image projection technology, staging a series of controversial public installations in Rosario: Transcurso Vital (1981), Testigos Blancos (1982), Madera y Trapo (1983), and Fusion de sangre Latinoamericana (1984).

Orta was a lecturer in the Faculty of Fine Arts of the Universidad Nacional de Rosario and a member of CONICET, the Argentinean national council for scientific research, until 1984, when he received a scholarship from the Ministry of Foreign and European affairs to pursue a D.E.A. (Diplôme d'études approfondies) at the Sorbonne in Paris.

=== Paris ===
In 1991, a fire in his Quai de la Seine studio tragically destroyed his entire archive of ephemeral works conducted in Argentina.

Parallel to a studio-based practice and the slow reconstruction of his archive, Orta began experimenting with the technology for large-scale image projection Light Works in the early 1980s and invented the Pyrex image plates for the PAE (Projector Art Effect) projectors. Exploring light as a new medium, he painted and illuminated mythical sites of architecture of cultural and historical significance across the world: Mount Aso (Japan), Cappadocia (Turkey), Zócalo (Mexico City), and Verdon Gorge (France).

In 1995 he, represented Argentina at the Biennale di Venezia with Light Works staged on Venetian Palaces along the Grand Canal (Venice)|Grand Canal. The most exceptional Light Work took place in 1992 during a three-week expedition along the Andes mountain range and culminated at the Inca vestiges of Machu Picchu and Sacsayhuamán to partake in the Inti Raymi in front of 200,000 Peruvian Indians.

=== Les Moulins ===
In 1993, Orta founded Les Moulins together with his partner Lucy Orta, with whom he now collaborates. Their major artworks include: Connector, OrtaWater, 70 x 7 The Meal, Antarctica, and Spirits.

Lucy + Jorge Orta are currently restoring a complex of artist studios and residencies on former industrial buildings sites situated along the Grand Morin river in Marne La Vallée as a living extension of their practice: “The staging of a social bond”. Their collaborative work, which often deals with environmental sustainability and urgent humanitarian crises, has been the focus of major exhibitions at:

- the Fondazione Bevilacqua La Masa Venice, Italy (2005);
- Museum Boijmans Van Beuningen, Rotterdam (2006);
- Galleria Continua, San Gimignano/ Beijing / Le Moulin (2007);
- Biennale del fin del Mundo, Antarctica (2007);
- Hangar Bicocca spazio d'arte, Milan (2008),
- Natural History Museum, London (2010);
- Shanghai Biennale (2012);
- MAXXI - National Museum of the 21st Century Arts, Rome (2012);
- Yorkshire Sculpture Park, Wakefield (2013); and
- Parc de la Villette, Paris (2014).

In 2007, the artists received the Green Leaf Award for Sculpture, for artistic excellence with an environmental message, presented by the United Nations Environment Programme in partnership with the Natural World Museum, at the Nobel Peace Centre Oslo, Norway. In 2013, they were awarded the inaugural Terrace Wires commission in London.

== Bibliography ==
- Potential Architecture (2013) ISBN 978-8862082907
- Clouds | Nuages (2012) ISBN 978-8862082167
- Lucy + Jorge Orta: Food Water Life (2011) ISBN 978-1568989914
- Light Works: Lucy + Jorge Orta (2010) ISBN 978-1907317040
- Mapping the Invisible: EU-Roma Gypsies (2010) ISBN 978-1906155919
- Antarctica, Lucy + Jorge Orta (2008) ISBN 978-88-370-6087-9
- Lucy + Jorge Orta Pattern Book, an introduction to collaborative practices (2007) ISBN 1904772757 / 13-978-1-904772-75-0
- Collective Space, Lucy + Jorge Orta (2006) ISBN 1-873352-34-4
- Drink Water! Lucy and Jorge Orta (2005) ISBN 88-7336-169-2
- Jorge Orta: Transparence. La face cachée de la lumière (1997) ISBN 978-2858932900
- Light Messenger. Jorge Orta. Venice Biennale (1997) ISBN 978-2858932474
