= Frédéric Borel =

French architect

- Born: 1959 (age 66–67); Roanne, France
- Occupation: Architect

Frédéric Borel is a French architect, born in 1959 in Roanne (France). He graduated from the École spéciale d'architecture (Paris) in 1982, and then began to work with Christian de Portzamparc. He created his own agency in Paris in 1984. His buildings are examples of deconstructivist architecture.

== Some buildings ==
- Apartment building boulevard de Belleville, Paris (1989)
- Apartment building rue Oberkampf, Paris (1994)
- Apartment building rue Pelleport, Paris (1999)
- Tribunal, Narbonne (2004)
- National school of architecture Paris-Val de Seine (2007)
