= École nationale supérieure d'architecture de Clermont-Ferrand =

Coordinates: 45.8016°N 3.1034°E

The École nationale supérieure d'architecture de Clermont-Ferrand or ENSACF is a French architectural school located in the city of Clermont-Ferrand in the Auvergne-Rhône-Alpes region of France. The school was founded in 1970.
