= Natural World Museum =

The Natural World Museum (NWM) was a mobile institution based in San Francisco, California that presented art as a catalyst to inspire and engage people in environmental awareness and action.

The Natural World Museum partnered with the United Nations Environment Programme (UNEP) to present art exhibitions each year for World Environment Day as part of their Art for the Environment initiative. NWM designed curatorial programs that offered new and creative perspectives on specific environmental themes such as green cities, desertification, and global climate change. These exhibitions featured both emerging and established artists and were hosted by international venues such as the Nobel Peace Center in Oslo, Norway.

NWM was an important source of commissions of new environmental art. For the 2007 World Environment Day exhibit, Envisioning Change: Melting Ice / A Hot Topic, NWM commissioned Alfio Bonnano to create a site-specific outdoor nature installation entitled "Ark", depicting a boat balanced in the treetops. The piece symbolizes the effects of global warming.

In 2007, NWM published a book entitled Art in Action: Nature, Creativity, and Our Collective Future, with a foreword by Achim Steiner, Executive Director of the United Nations Environment Programme, and containing artworks by Christo and Jeanne-Claude, Joseph Beuys, Ed Burtynsky, Ken Rinaldo, and Cai Guo-Qiang, among others.

As part of NWM's educational outreach programs, hundreds of children and youth from all over the world participated in the Planet Art program; the program's purpose was to instill environmental awareness in the future stewards of the earth. NWM also held an ongoing lecture series and annual international symposium that bridged the worlds of art, science, and the environment, featuring guest speakers such as Al Gore, Ernest Callenbach, Hunter Lovins, Joanna Macy, Daryl Hannah, and Wangari Maathai, Nobel Laureate 2004.

Mia Hanak was the Founding Executive Director, from 2001 to 2008. In May 2009, NWM was officially closed and is no longer a functioning museum.

== See also ==
- Museum of the Earth
