= French sculpture =

Statues
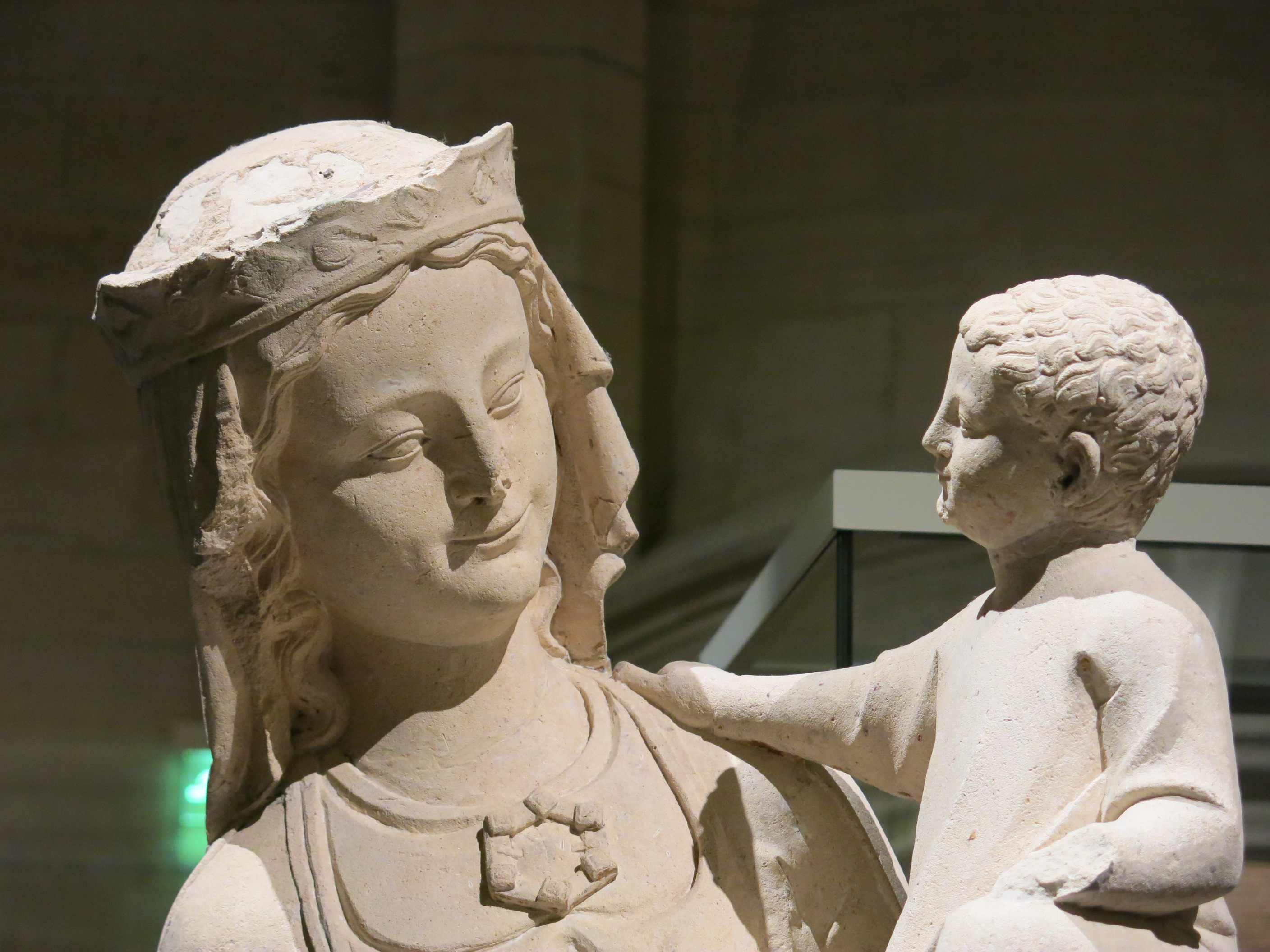
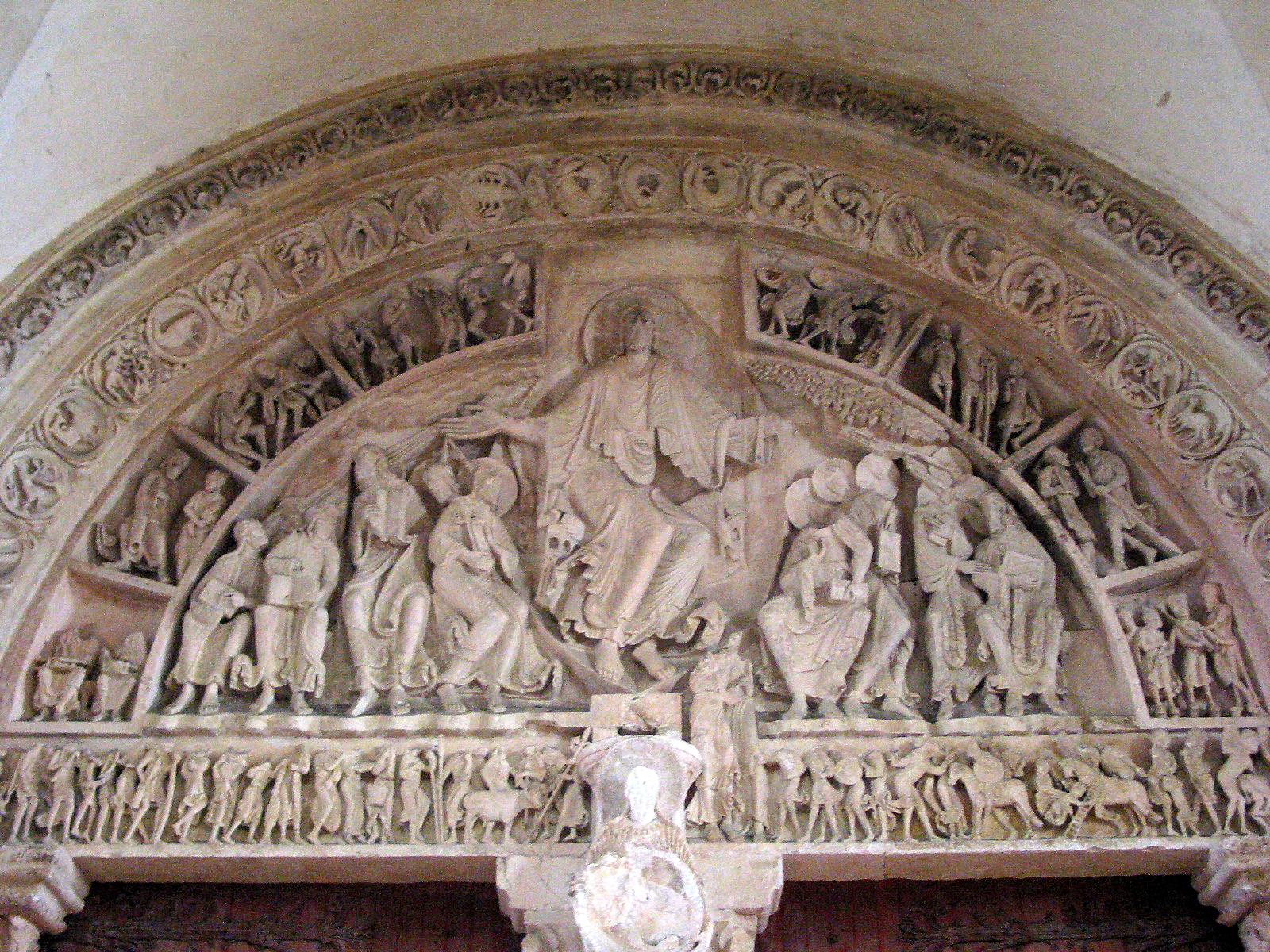
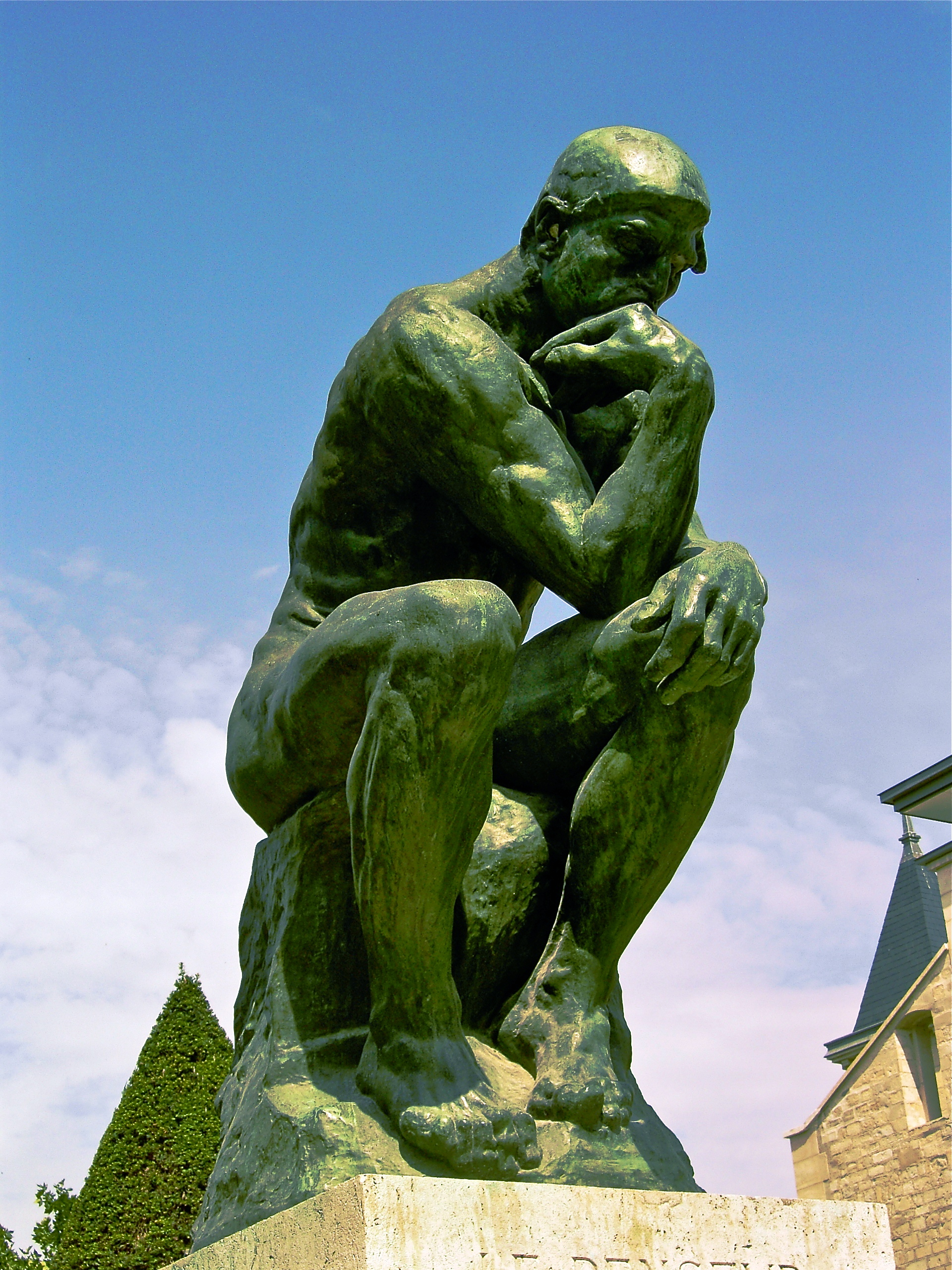
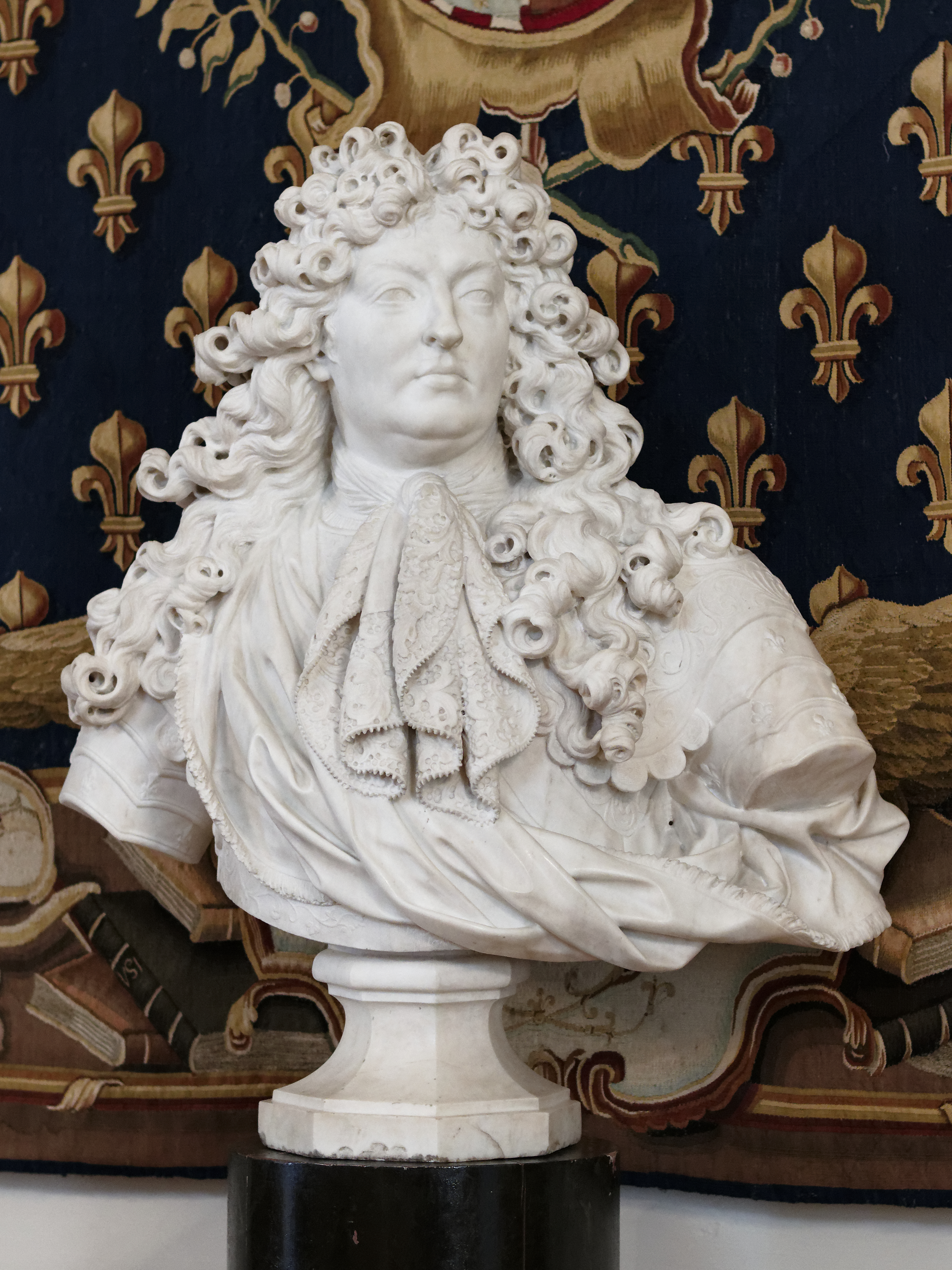
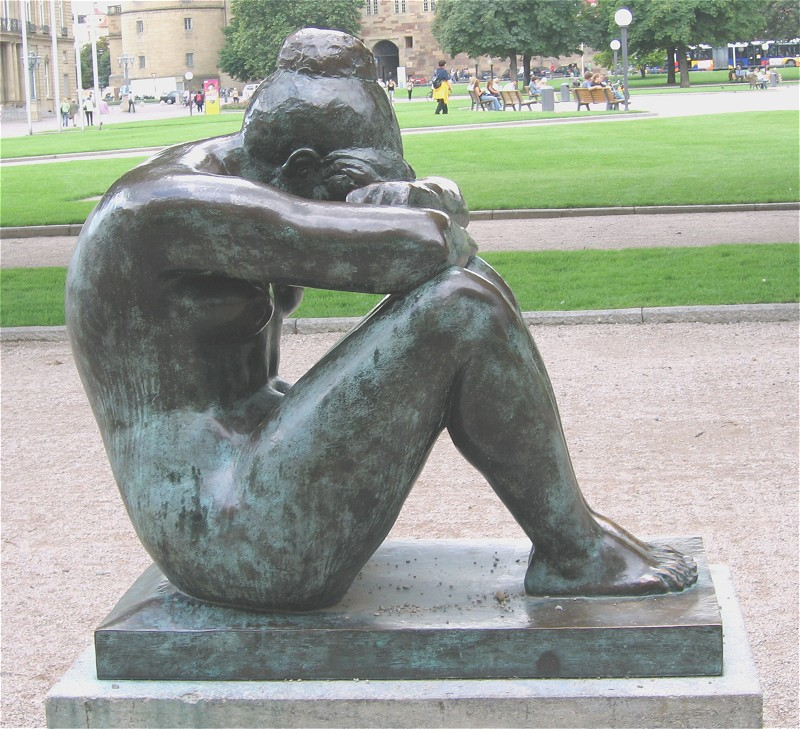
- Statues

French sculpture has been an original and influential component of world art since the Middle Ages. The first known French sculptures date to the Upper Paleolithic age. French sculpture originally copied ancient Roman models, then found its own original form in the decoration of Gothic architecture. French sculptors produced important works of Baroque sculpture for the decoration of the Palace of Versailles. In the 19th century, the sculptors Auguste Rodin and Edgar Degas created a more personal and non-realistic style, which led the way to modernism in the 20th century, and the sculpture of Pablo Picasso, Georges Braque, Marcel Duchamp and Jean Arp.

== Prehistory ==
The earliest undisputed examples of sculpture belong to the Aurignacian culture, which was located in Europe and southwest Asia and active at the beginning of the Upper Paleolithic. As well as producing some of the earliest known cave art, the people of this culture developed finely crafted stone tools, manufacturing pendants, bracelets, ivory beads, and bone-flutes, as well as three-dimensional figurines.

Two of the largest prehistoric sculptures can be found at the Tuc d'Audobert caves in France, where around 12–17,000 years ago a sculptor used a spatula-like stone tool and fingers to model a pair of large bison in clay against a limestone rock.

Human forms and animals were common in the early sculpture, often in the form of bas-relief. Figures expressed emotion, and were often distorted; the forms of women were often strangely obese. The Venus of Laussel is one of the earliest examples. With the beginning of the Mesolithic the amount of figurative sculpture diminished, and animals predominated, expressing mobility and vigor. In the later Mesolithic period, the sculpture became less realistic and turned toward abstract, ornamental decorative forms, which continued through the Bronze Age and the Iron Age. The arrival of the Celts, Ligures and Iberian peoples did not radically change the style. Human forms were usually carves simply as stylized silhouettes. On the coast of the Mediterranean, sculptors made friezes of warriors and various deities seated with their legs crossed.

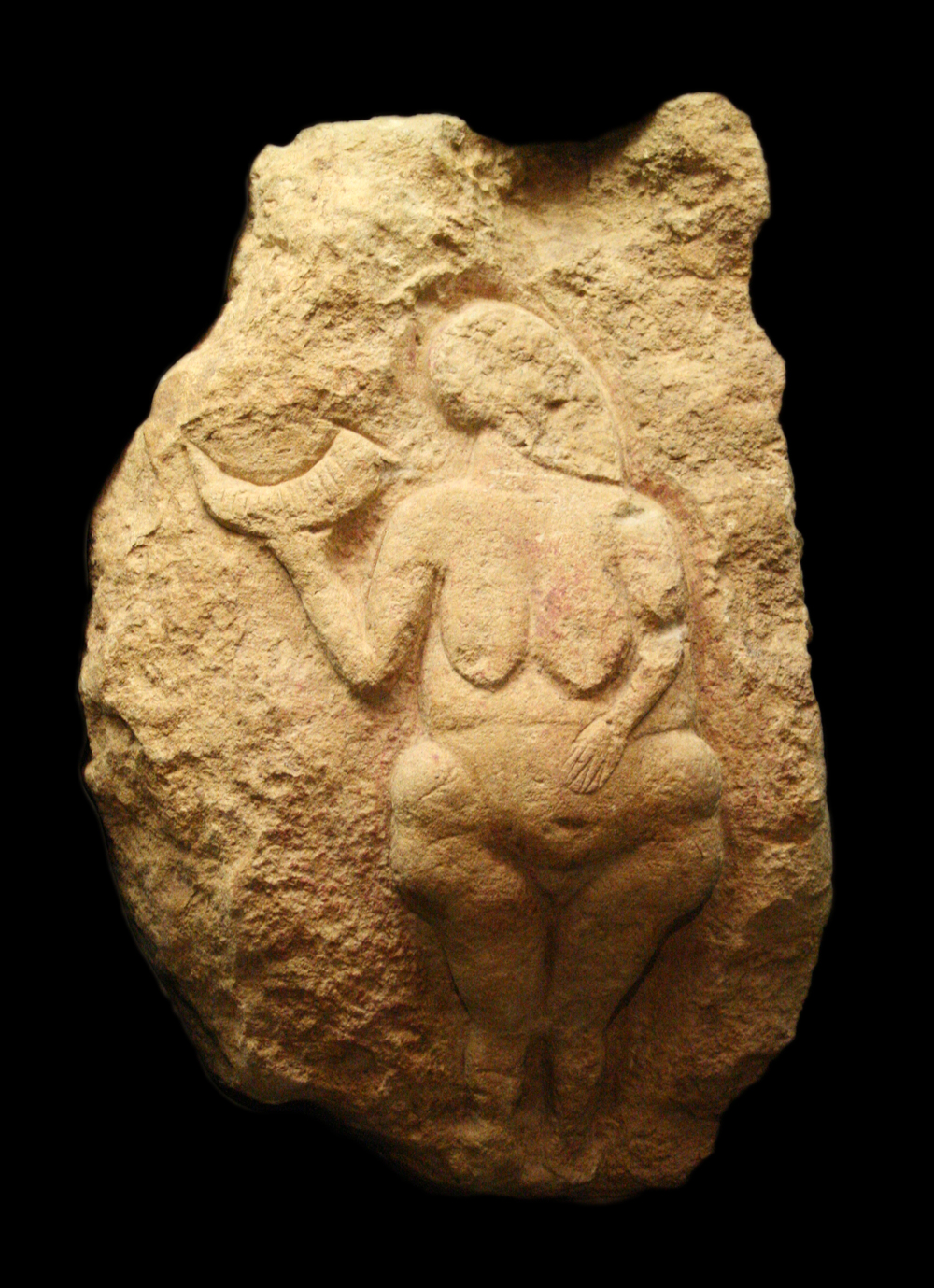
Venus of Laussel c. 25,000 BCE, an Upper Palaeolithic carving, Bordeaux museum, France

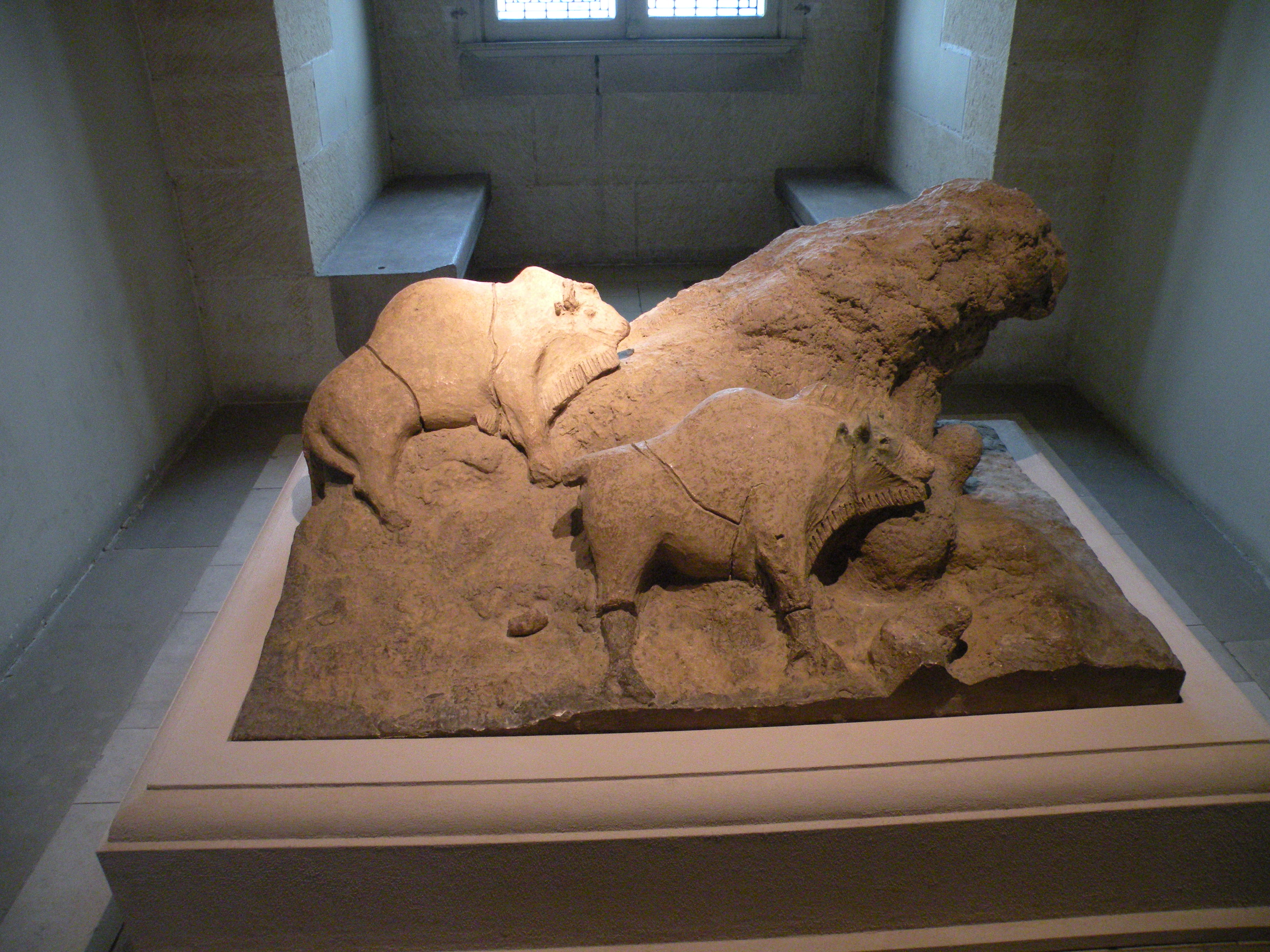
Clay figures of two bison from Tuc d'Audobert caves, 12-17000 BCE

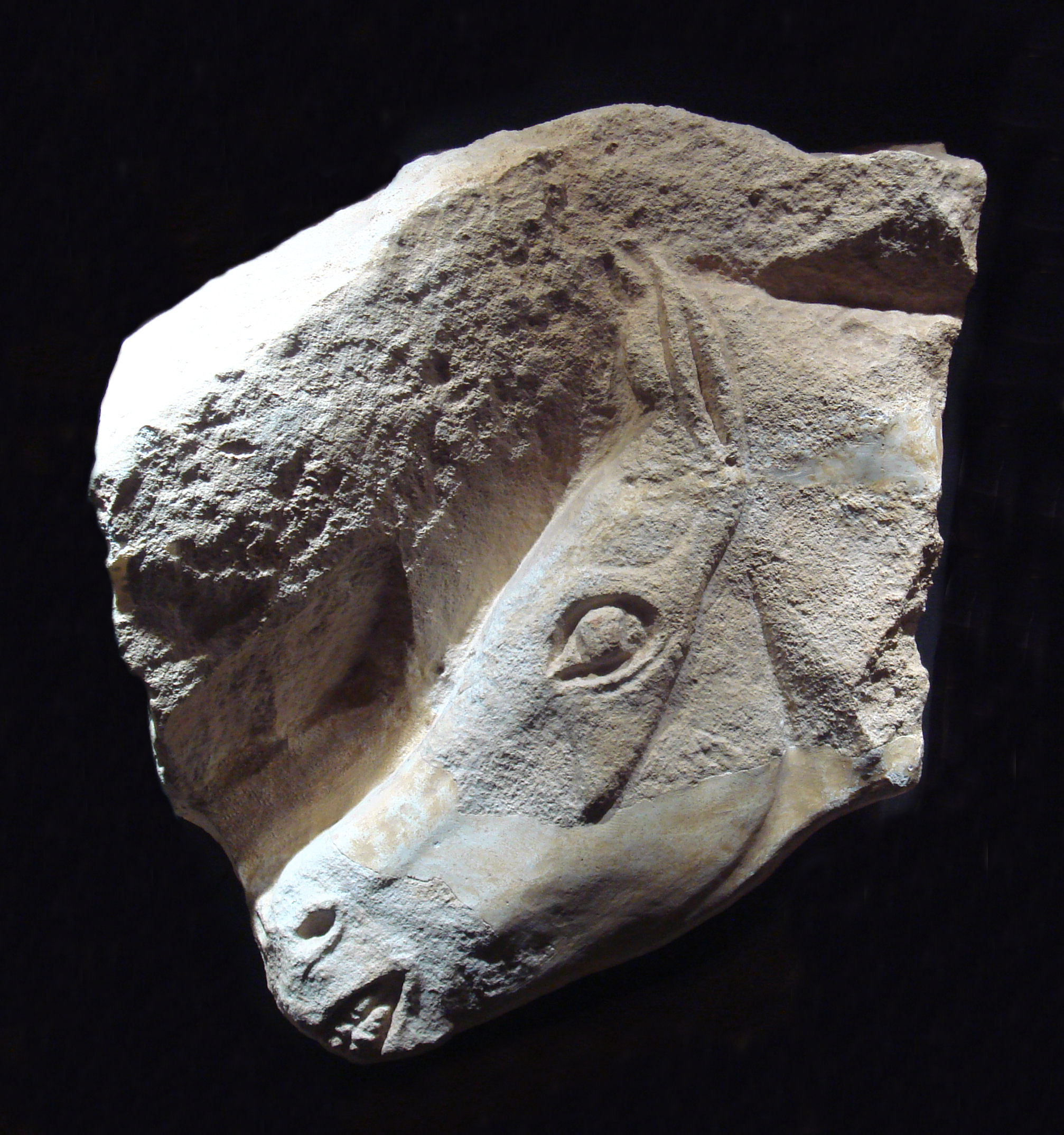
Magdalenian Horse, c. 17,000 BCE Musée d'Archéologie Nationale, France

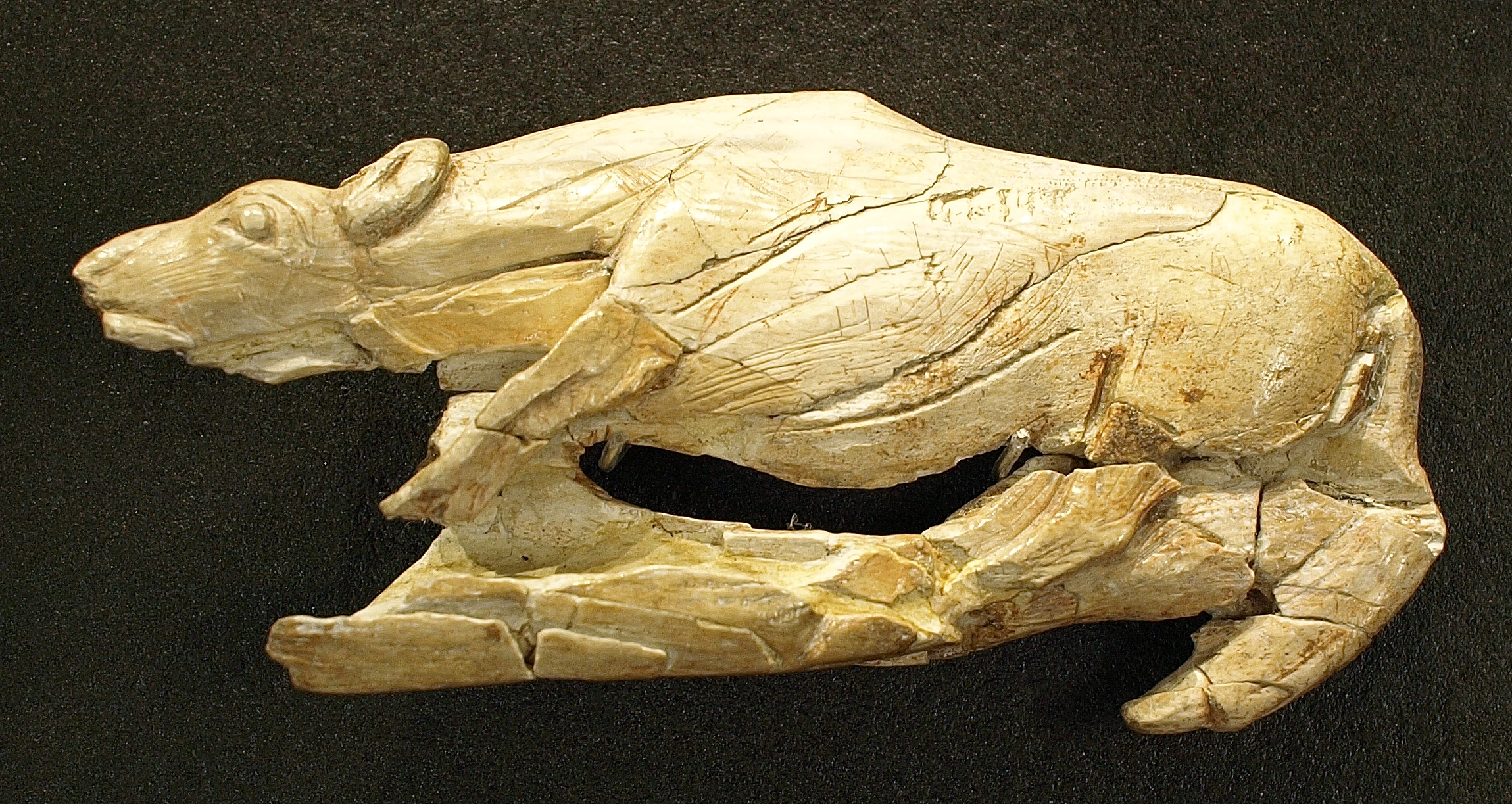
Creeping Hyena, c. 12–17,000 BCE, mammoth ivory, found in La Madeleine, France

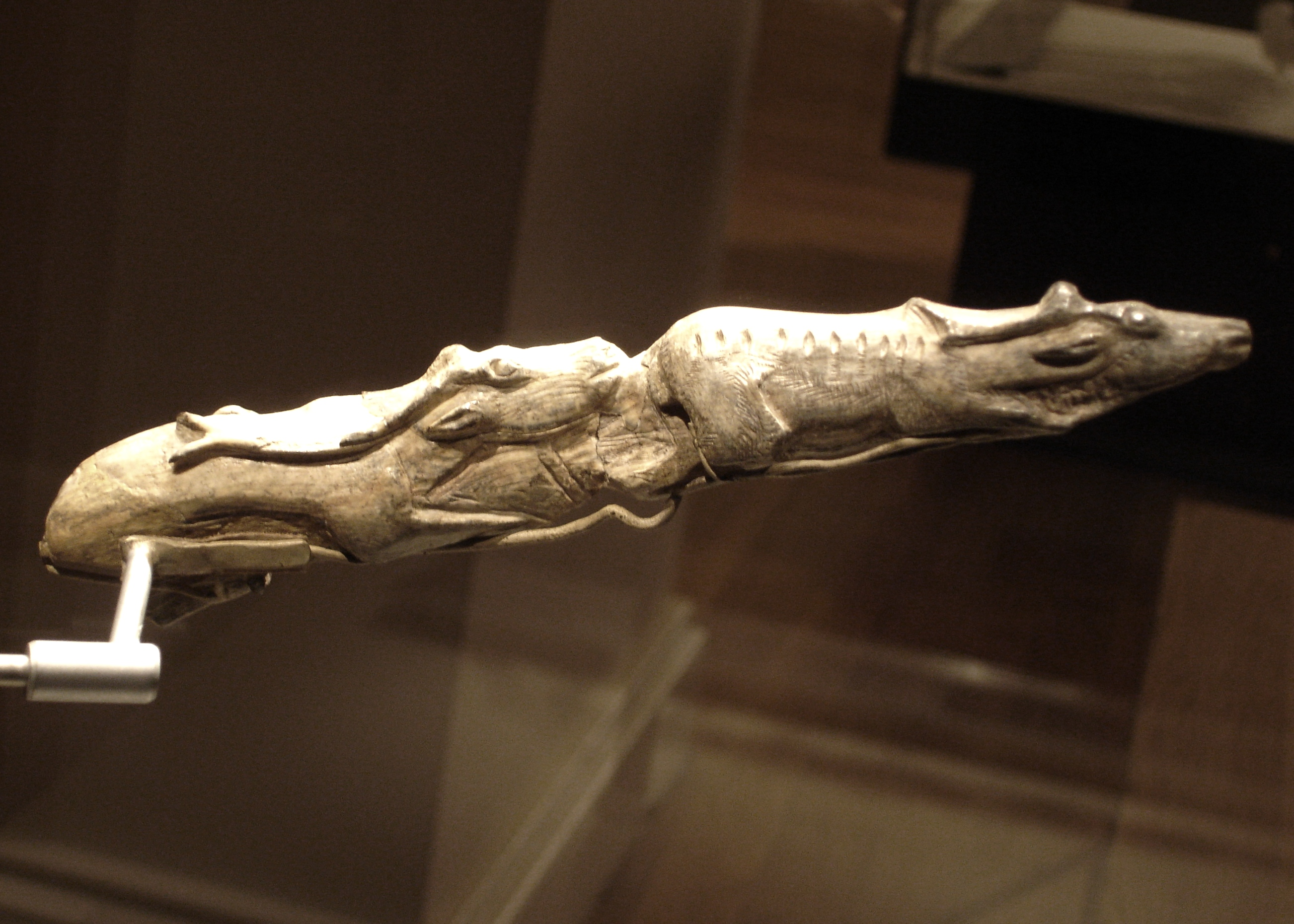
Swimming Reindeer c. 13,000 BCE, female and male swimming reindeer – late Magdalenian period, found at Montastruc, Tarn et Garonne, France

== Gallo-Roman and Carolingian ==
The Roman conquest of Gaul imposed the Roman style, featuring realism and celebration of grandeur and power. Gallo-Roman sculptors of Gaul modified the Roman style to make it more delicate and personal. Sculpture flourished in the form of statuettes, bronze vases, and subjects on domestic and religious themes. Early Christian symbolism soon appeared in sculptural works such as sarcophagi, but it was largely discouraged by church leaders who feared a return to the worship of idols.

Gallic sculpture showed the influence not only of Roman sculpture, but also of Hellenic sculpture, from workshops in central Italy. One characteristic example is the statue of Medea in the Museum of Arles, from the 1st century.

The invasion of Roman Gaul by the Burgundians, Celtes, Visigoths slowed the development of sculpture beyond traditional decorative designs. The age of Charlemagne restored a certain prestige to the arts, but the sculpture was not original or skilled, and after the death of Charlemagne little important sculpture appeared until the reign of the Capetian dynasty (987–1328)

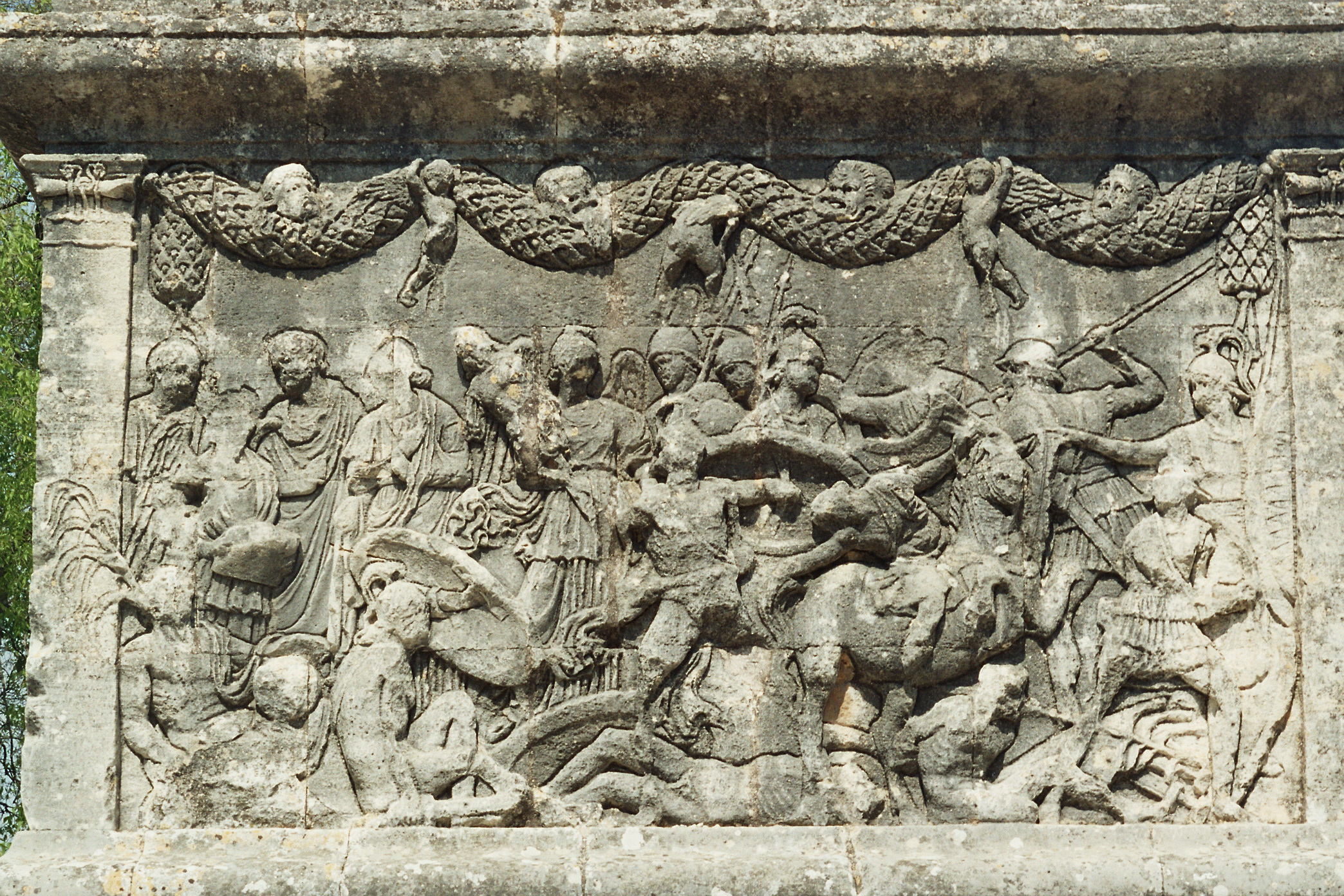
Relief of Romans in combat, Mausoleum of the Julii, Glanum (Saint-Rémy de Province), 35-25 BCE

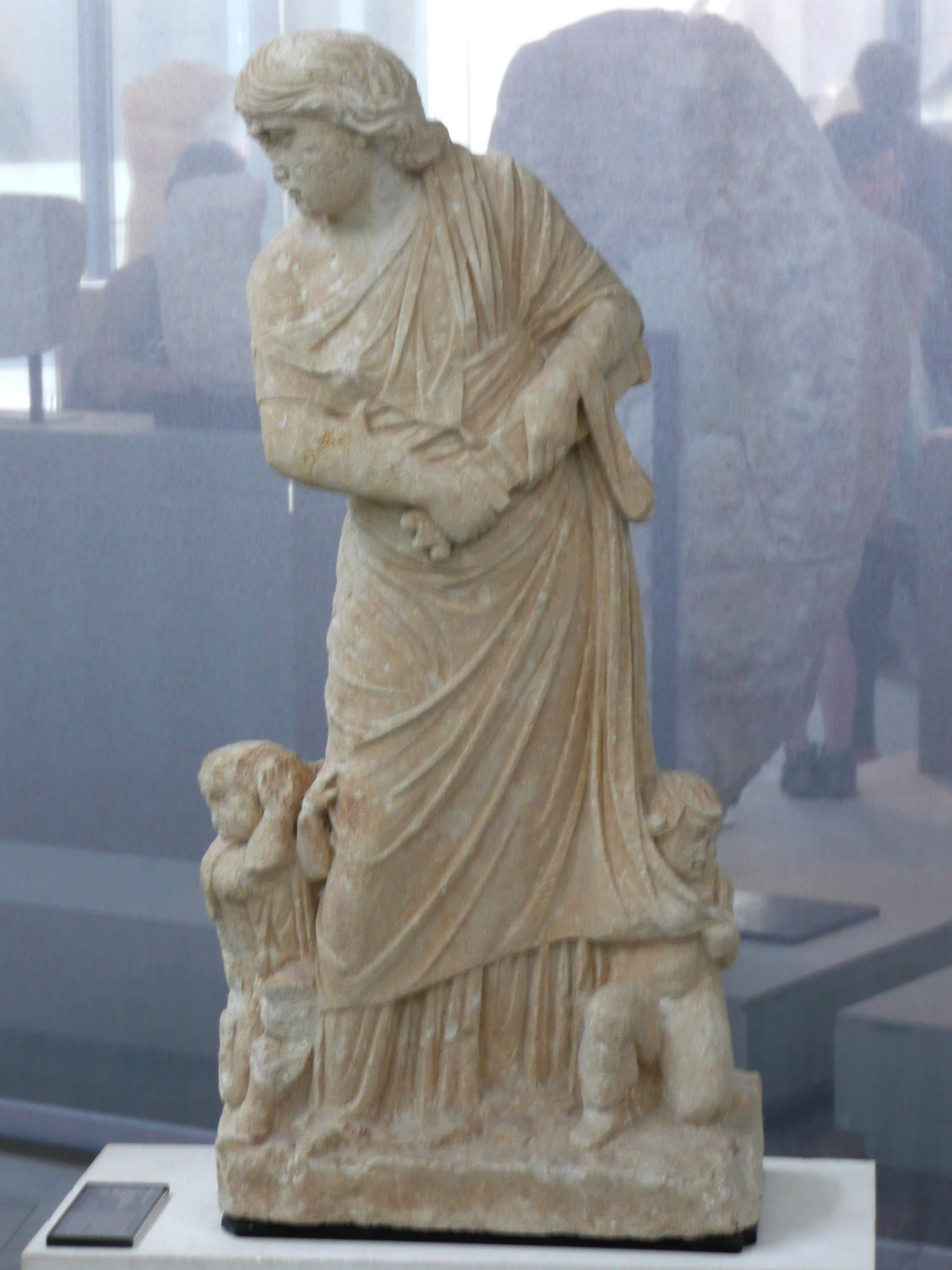
Statue of Medea, limestone, 2nd century AD, Musée de l'Arles Antique, Arles

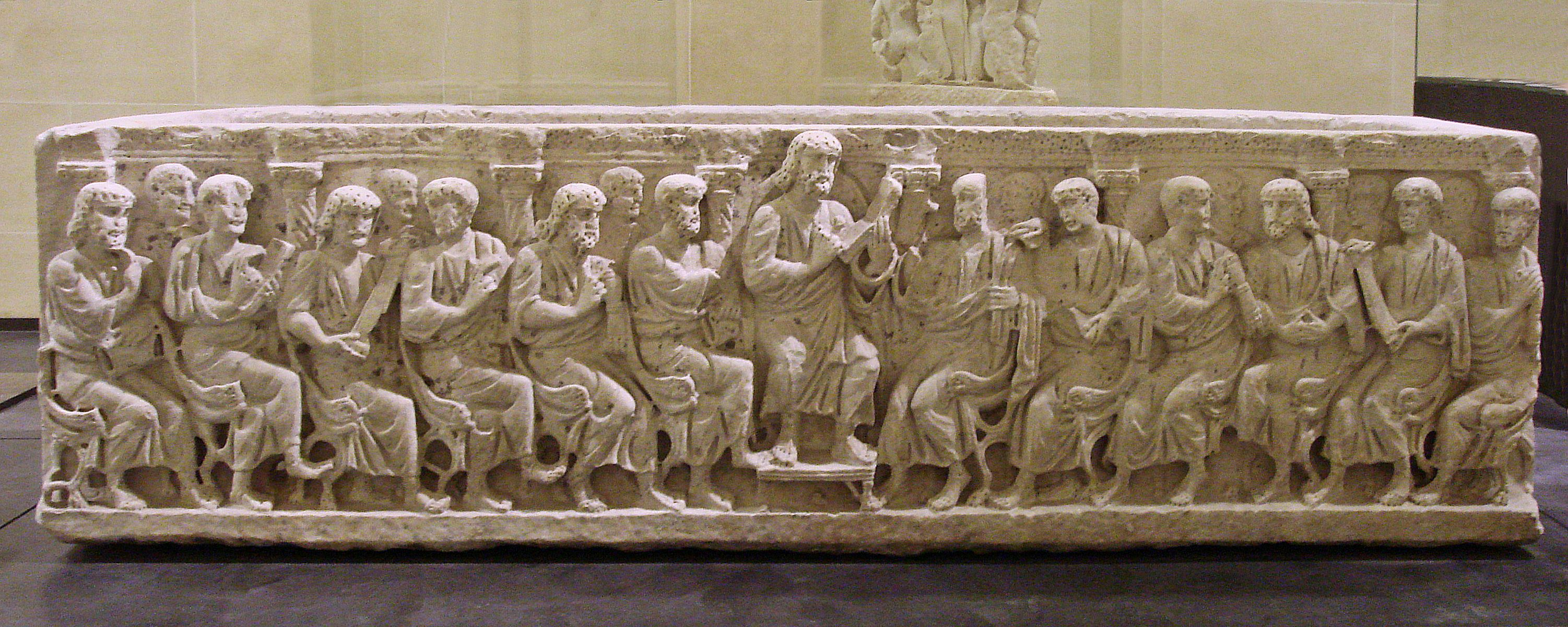
A Gallo-Roman sarcophagus from Rignnieux le Franc, Ain (end of 4th century)

== Romanesque sculpture ==
Under the Capetian dynasty, the Kingdom of France was gradually returned to calm, stability and prosperity. A reform of the church and the founding of new religious orders led to important commands for sculptures, especially for the new Cluny Abbey (1088–1108) of the Benedictine order. Other Abbeys across France imitated its use of sculptural decoration.

The earliest sculptural decorations on altars and the interior surfaces of churches, on lintels, over doorways and particularly on the capitals of columns, which were commonly adorned with images of biblical figures and real or mythical animals. Most of the work was almost flat with little attempt at realism. Some of the earliest Romanesque sculpture in France is found at Saint-Génis-des-Fontaines Abbey (1019–1020) in the eastern Pyrenees. A lintel over a doorway portrays Christ on a throne, in a frame supported by two angels, and flanked by the apostles, The forms of the apostles are defined by the shapes of the arches into which they are squeezed. This "Christ in Majesty" design over the central doorway became a common feature for churches and Cathedrals across France in the Romanesqua dn Gothic period.

In the later Romanesque period, sculpture was often used to at the most important points, such as the facades, to emphasize the lines of the structure. It often used geometric designs (circles, squares, triangles). Spaces were crowded with figures, which were often contorted so they seemed to be dancing. The sculpture was most profuse on the capitals of columns and on the portals, where it was used to present very complex and extended biblical stories. Sculptors also depicted a large number of animals, both real and imaginary, including chimeras, sirens, lions, and a wide range of monsters. Imagination usually prevailed over realism.

The southwest of France, around Toulouse, had a particular style, more vivid and active than the north. A remarkable group of Romanesque sculpture is found in the decoration of the Basilica of Saint-Sernin, Toulouse in Toulouse, dating to the late 11th and early 12th century. The figures are much more realistic, and make skillful use of shadows and light to bring out the details. One of the most distinctive works is the altar table, signed by its sculptor, Bernardus Geldvinus. He also made the seven sculptural reliefs found in the ambulatory of the cathedral.

Other remarkable examples of Romaesque sculpture are found on the tympanum and the capitals of the columns of the cloister of Moissac Abbey in Mossac, Tarne-et-Garonne, and the columns of the abbey church of Saint-Marie in Souillac in the Lot Department. Sculptors in Burgundy also produced distinctive works for the decoration of the churches there, particularly for Saint-Philibert de Tournus Abbey (about 1100). The Typanum of Vézelay Abbey, a pilgrimage church dedicated by the Pope in 1132, shows the state of the art of Romanessque sculpture at the end of the Romanesque and beginning of the Gothic period.

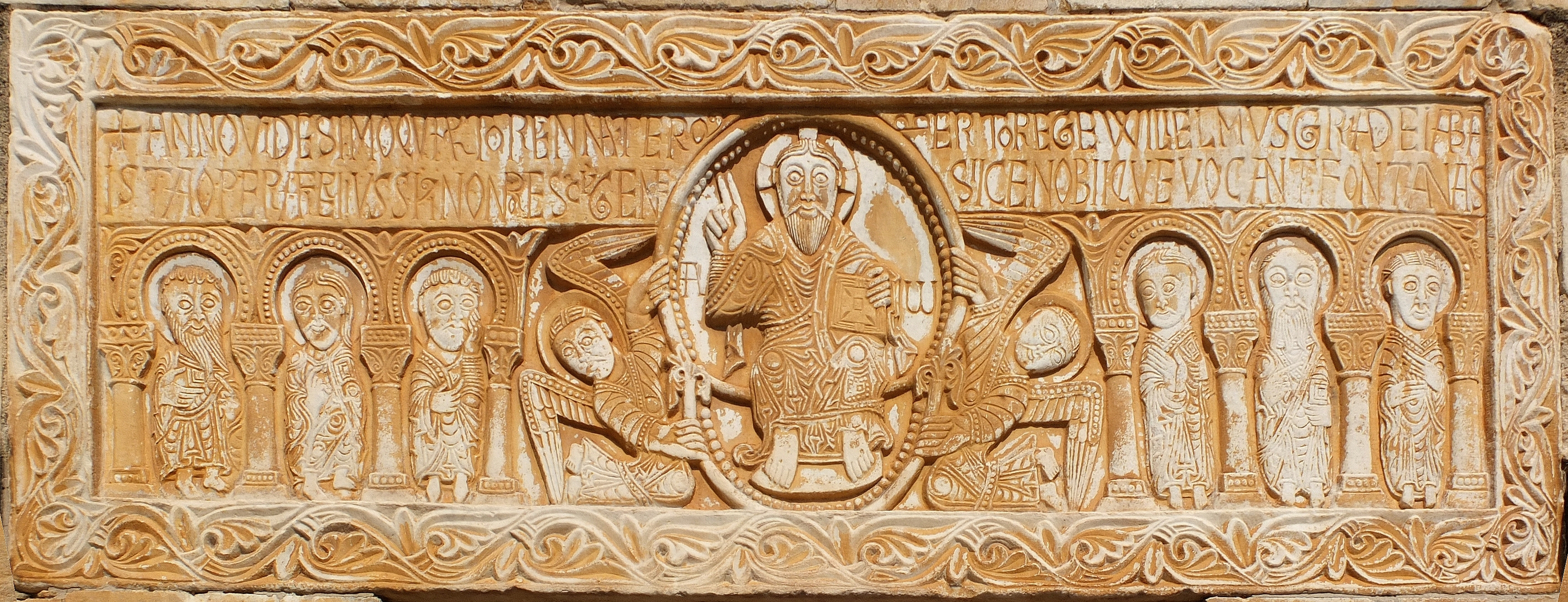
Early Romanesque lintel over a doorway at Saint-Génis-des-Fontaines Abbey (1019–1020)

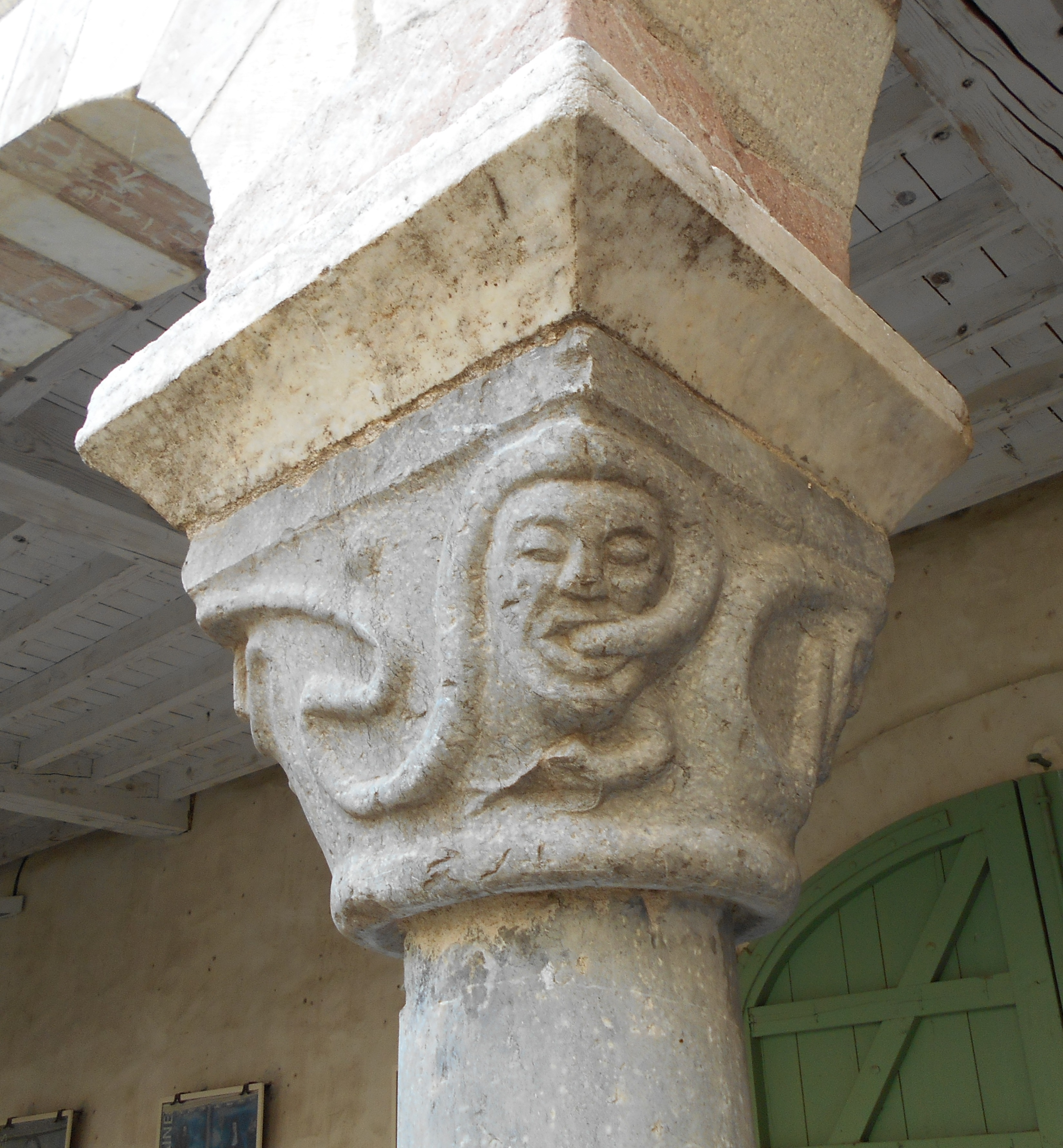
Column capital at Saint-Génis-des-Fontaines Abbey in the Pyrenees (1019–1020)

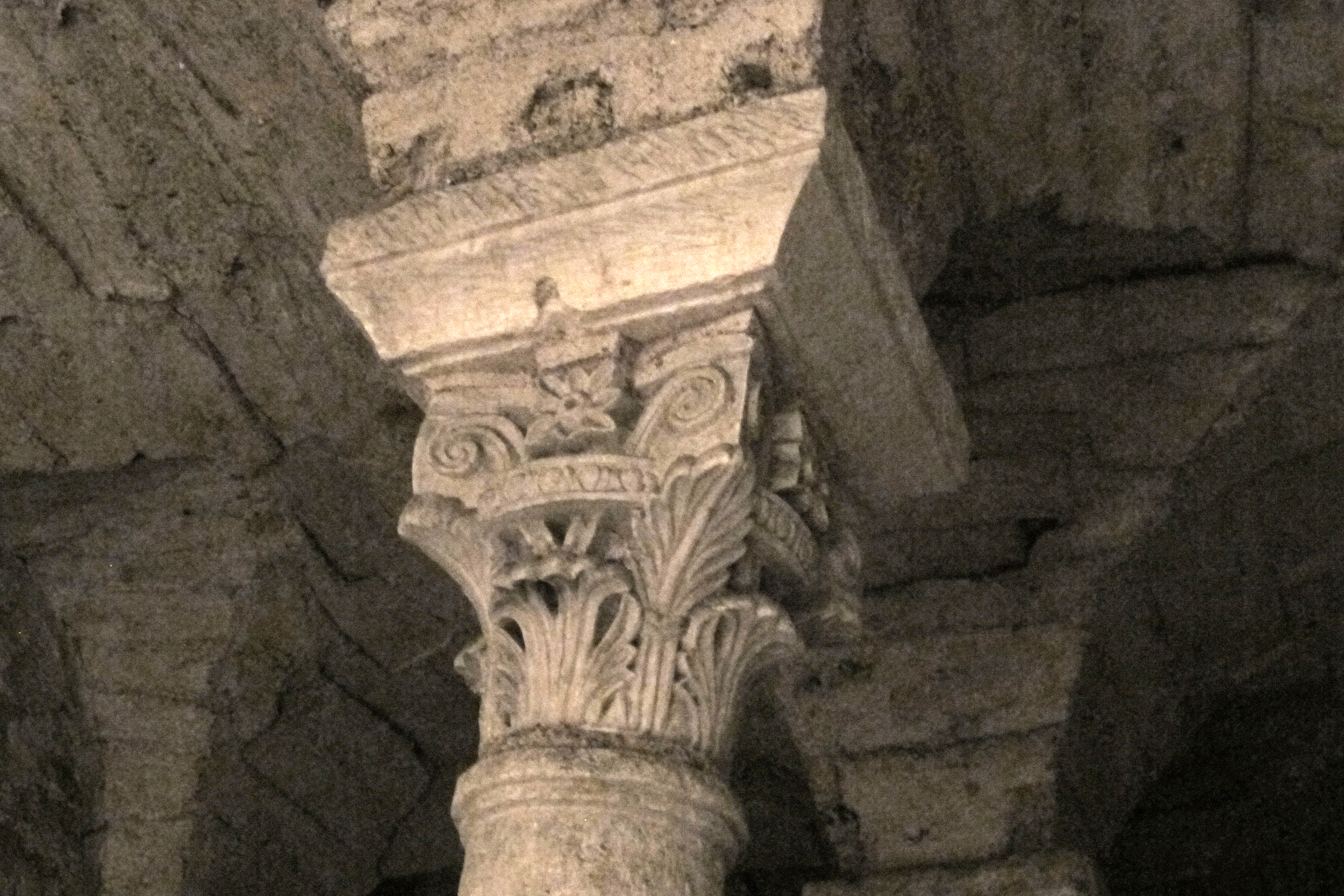
Capital of column in Saint-Philibert de Tournus Abbey in Burgundy (about 1100)

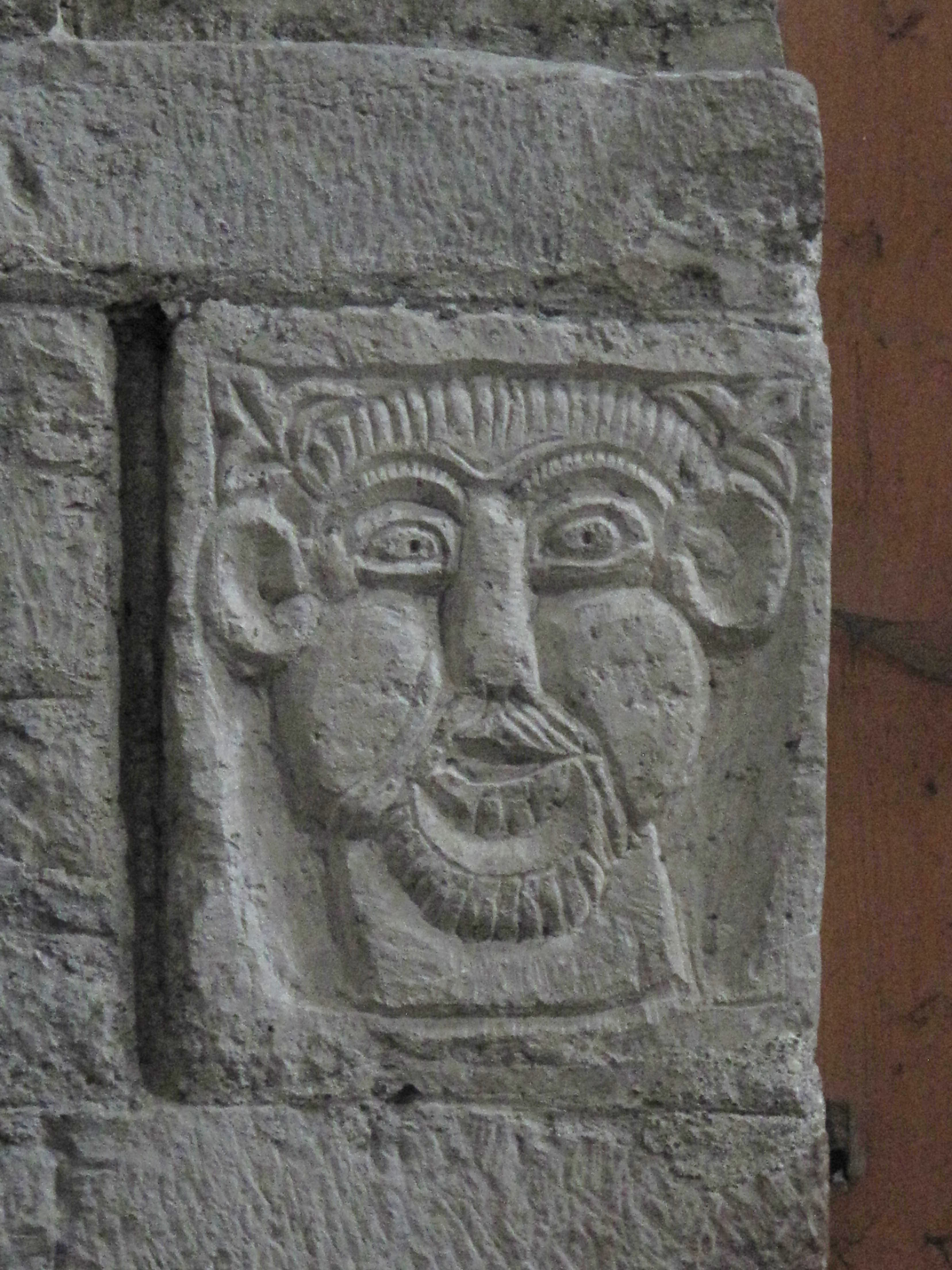
Sculpted face from Saint-Philibert de Tournus Abbey in Burgundy.

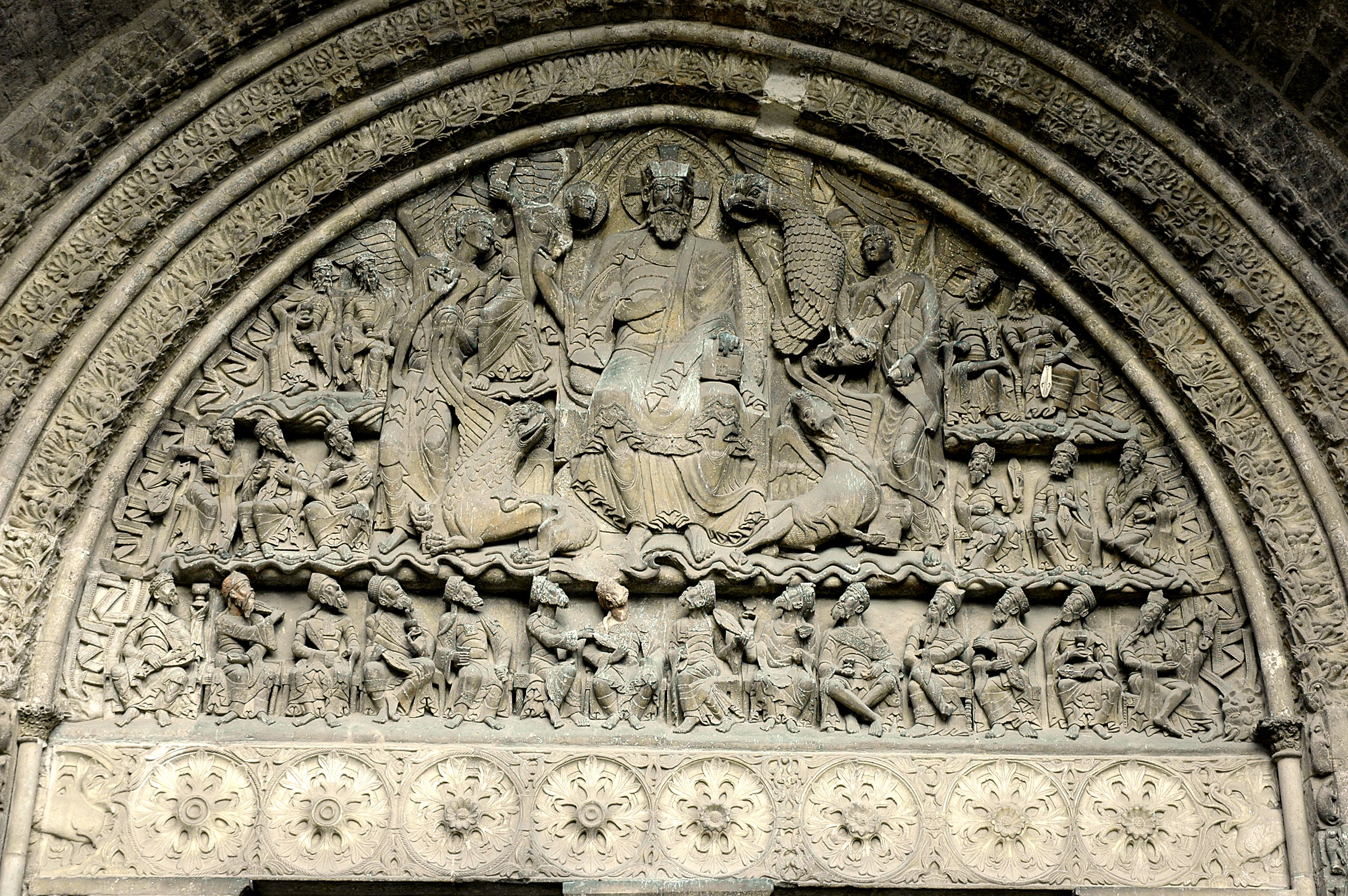
Typanum of the southwest portal of Moissac Abbey (11th-12th century)

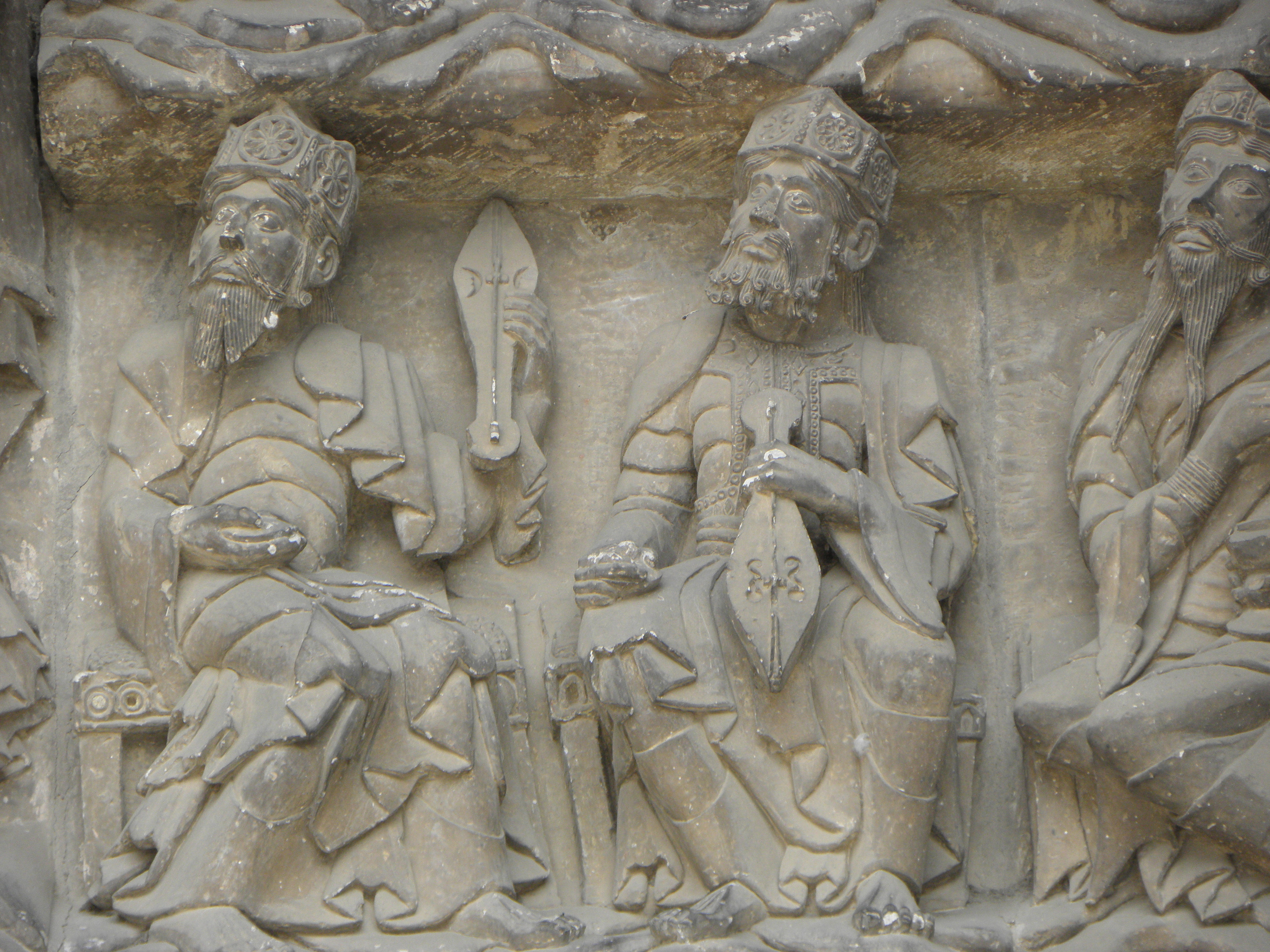
Detail of the Wise Men in the Moissac Abbey (11th-12th century)

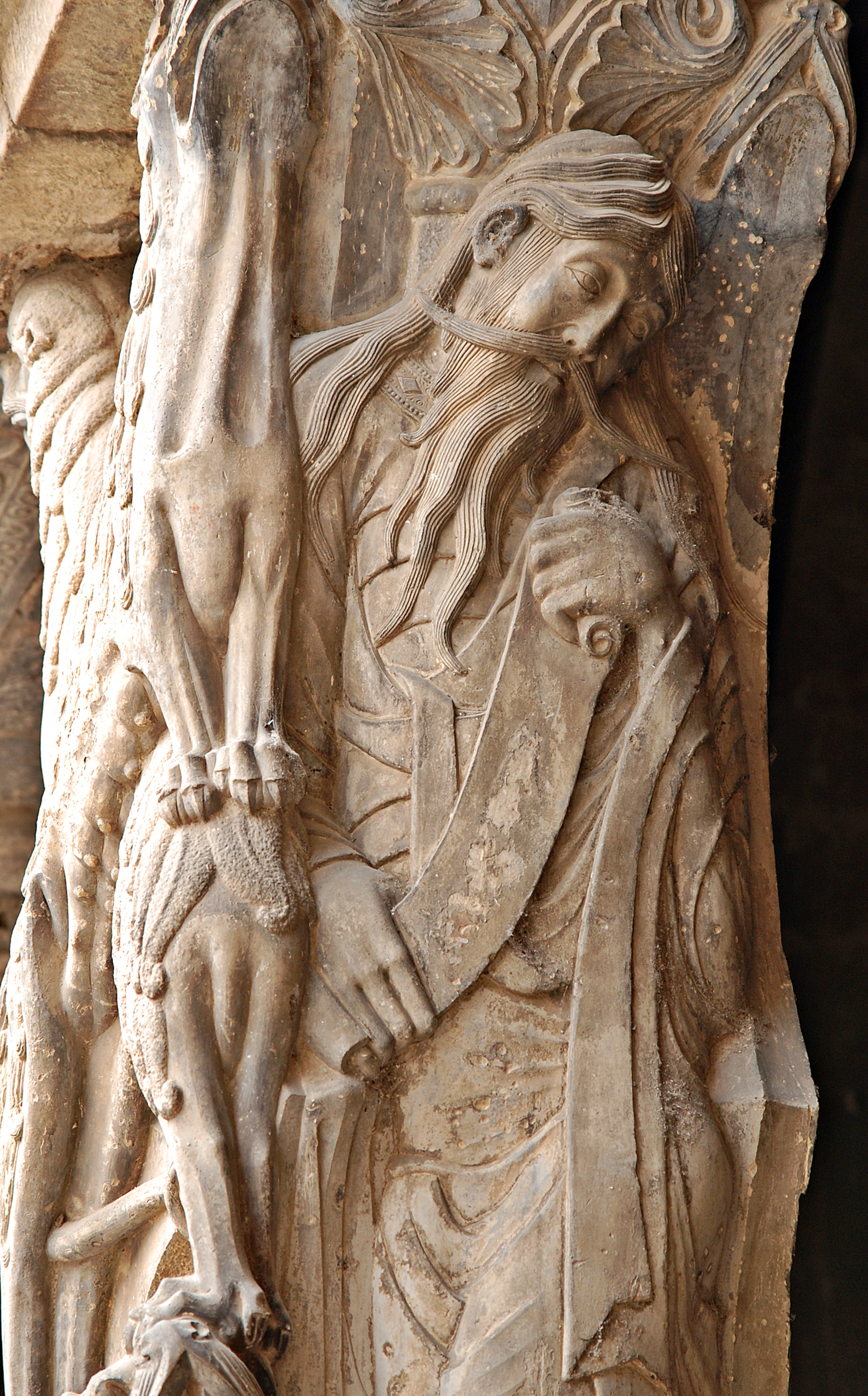
Figure of the prophet Jeremiah on the south portal of Moissac Abbey (11th-12th century)

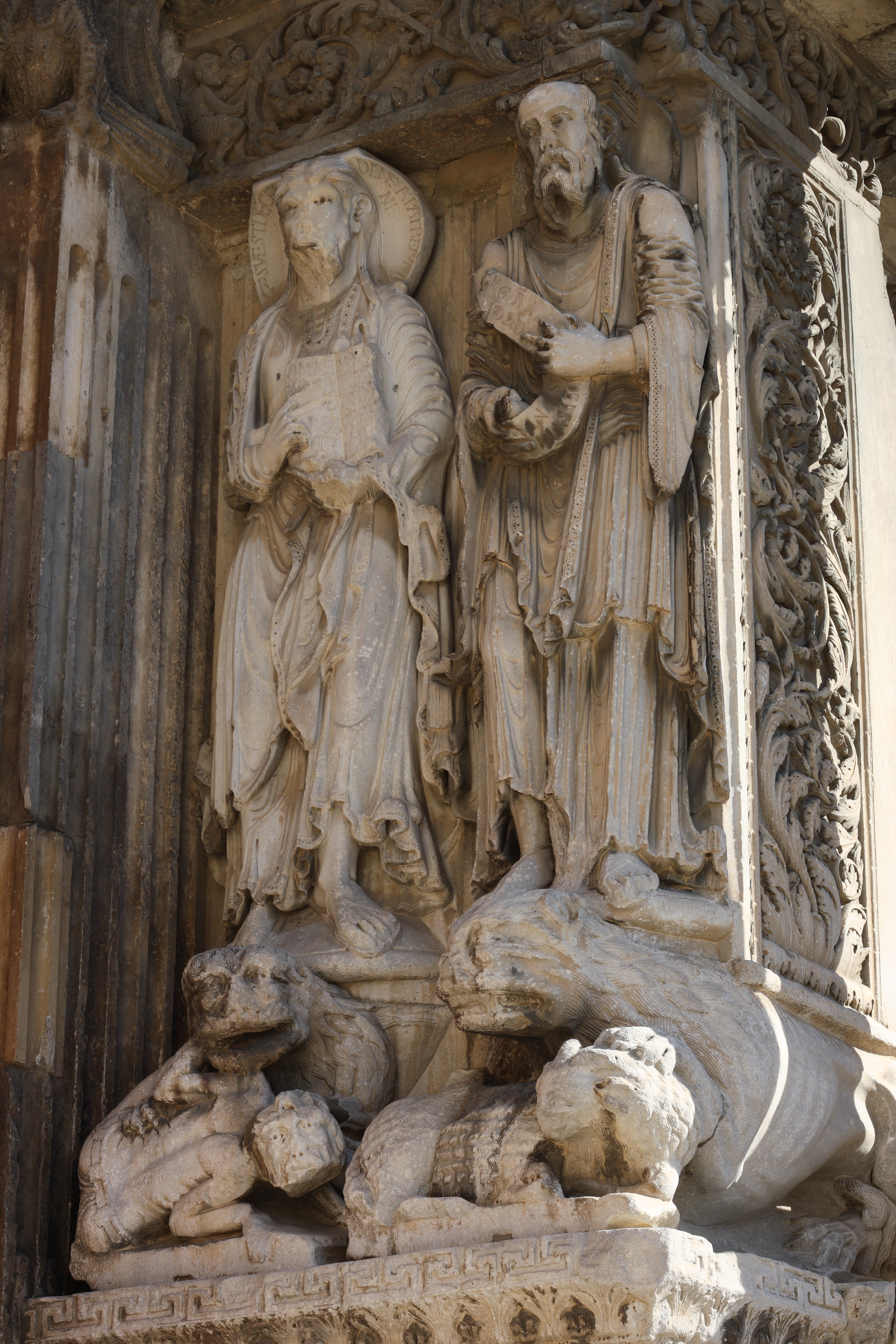
Statues of Saint Paul and Saint Jacob on the portal of Abbey of Saint-Gilles

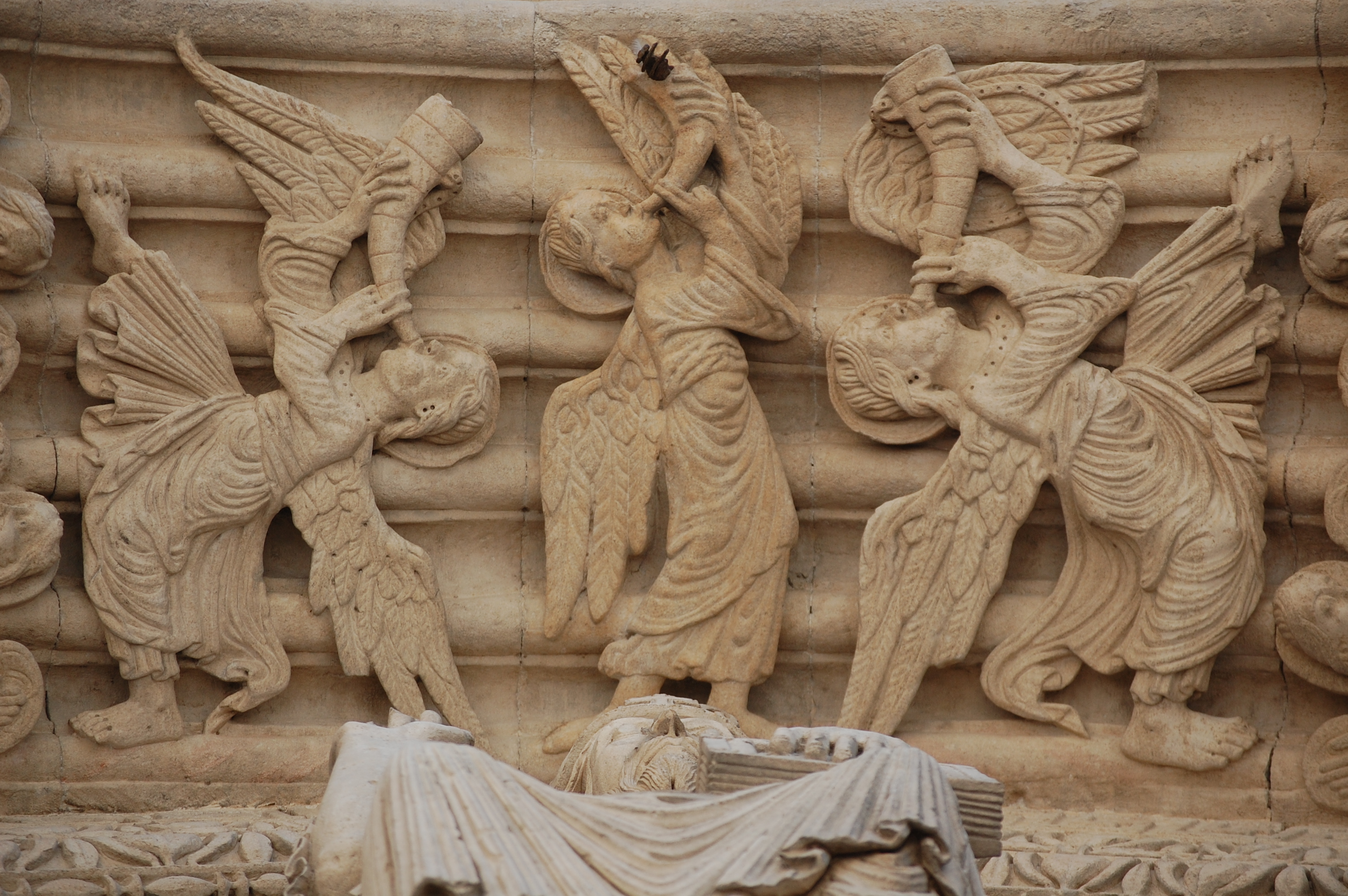
Angels blowing trumpets, Church of St. Trophime, Arles

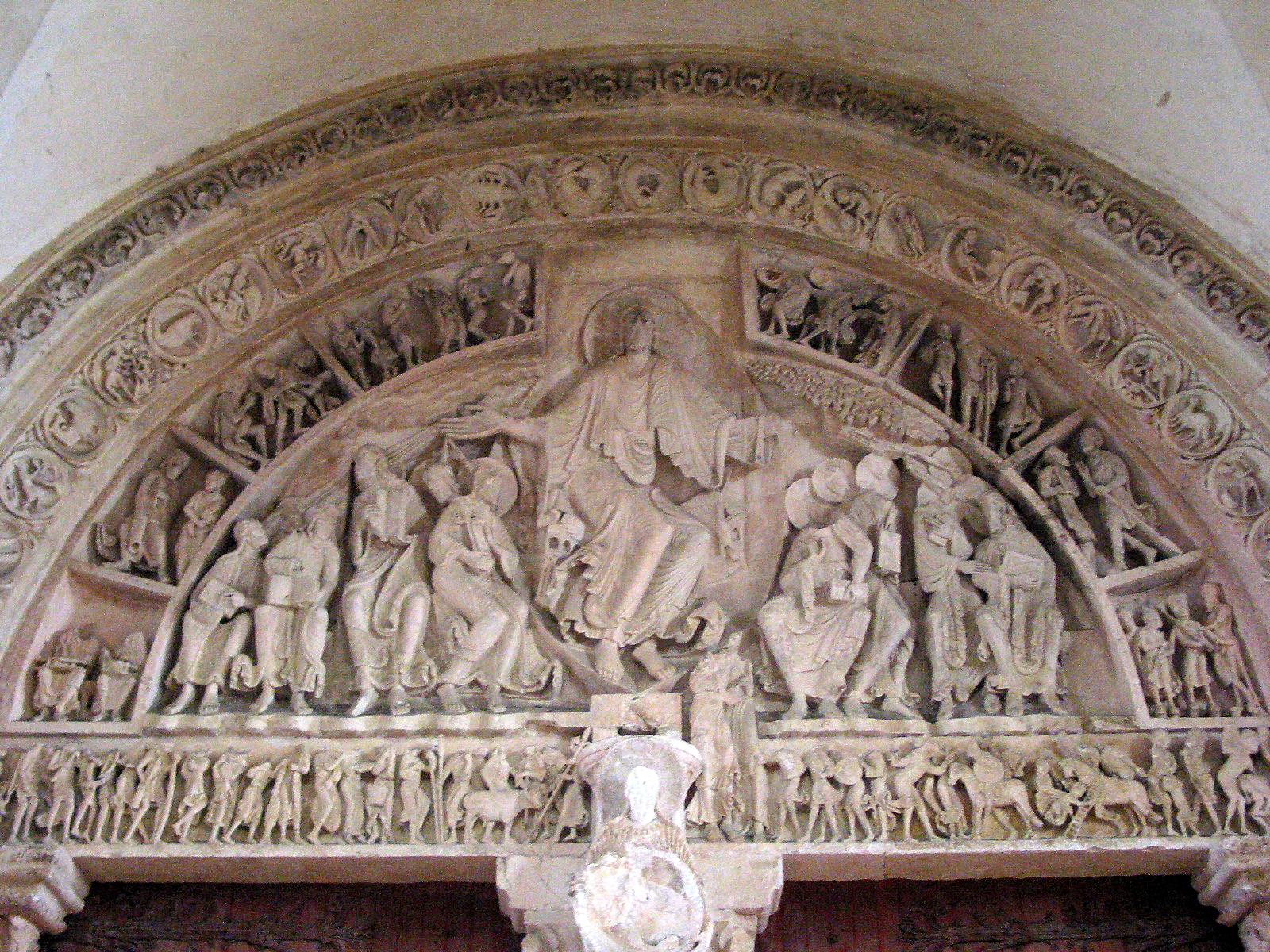
The Tympanum of Vézelay Abbey (completed 1132)

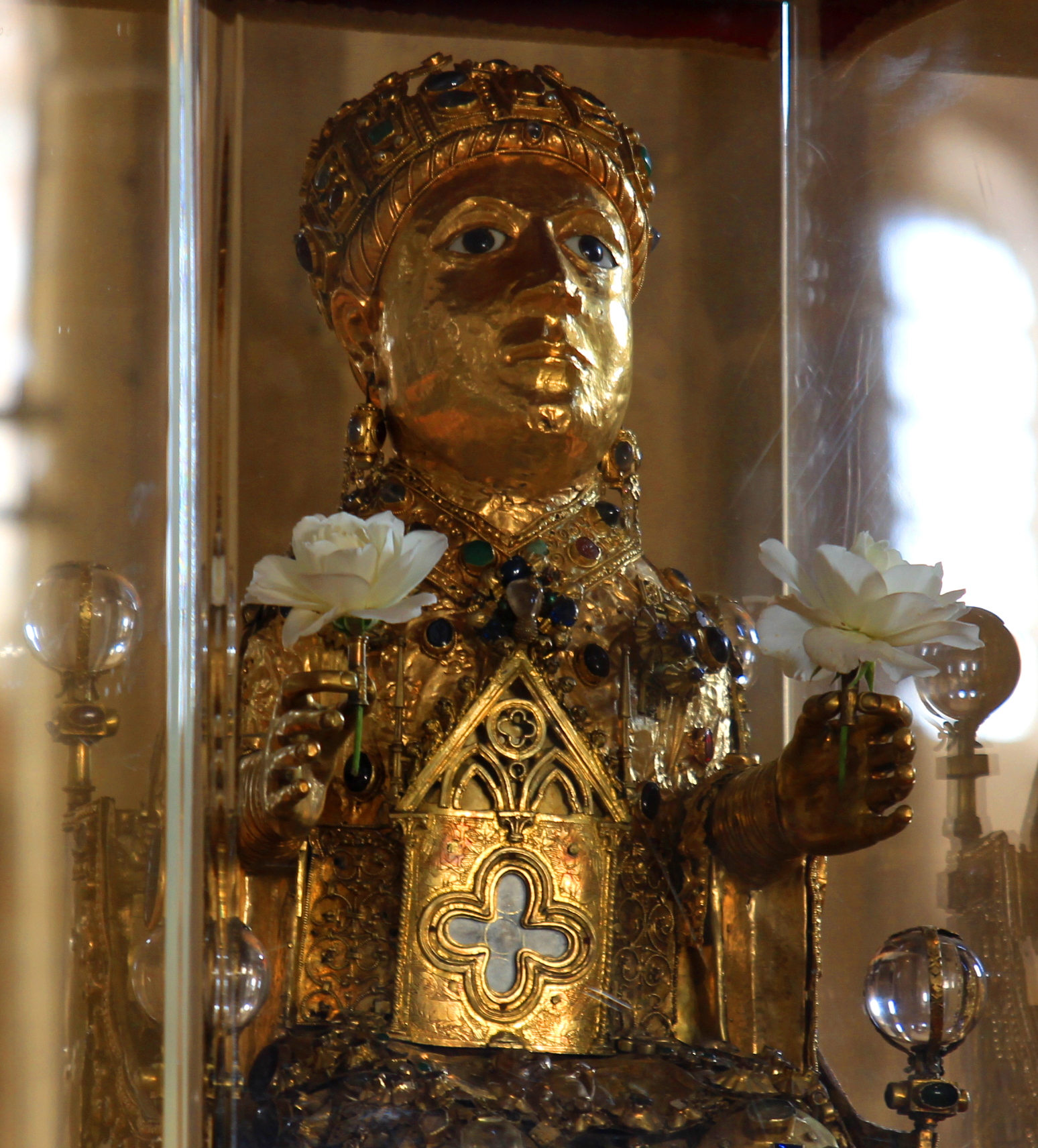
Statue-Reliquary of Saint Foy, in Conques, gold and silver plaques over wood (9th-10th century)

== Gothic sculpture ==
At the beginning of the 12th century, a renewal of sculptural styles began in France. During years of peace, the birthrate had greatly increased, and larger churches and cathedrals were needed. The cathedral replaced the abbey as the major religious institution, and the Bishop replaced the Abbot as the primary figure determining artistic style. The interiors of churches were higher, with larger windows, and filled with light, calling for a different kind of sculpture. The exteriors were also much higher, and needed statuary visible and readable from down below. Sculptors abandoned the exotic foliage borrowed from earlier sculptural styles, such as the acanthus and palmetto, in favor of more local forms, such as the grape leaf and oak leaf pattern. The human forms were no longer twisted and tortured to fit the space; they took on a more natural appearance. The sculpture was expected to be a book written in stone, for the worshippers to read. Abbot Suger, who directed the construction of the first Gothic abbey in Saint-Denis, observed, "Art conducts human souls by the use of material things to reach the immaterial." One Gothic sculptural innovation, borrowed from the ancient Greeks, was the column in the form of a human figure, Another was the use of sculpture of various mythical creatures, such as the gargoyle and the chimera, to warn the faithful of the dangers outside the church. (The gargoyles also had the practical application of projecting rain water away from the walls.)

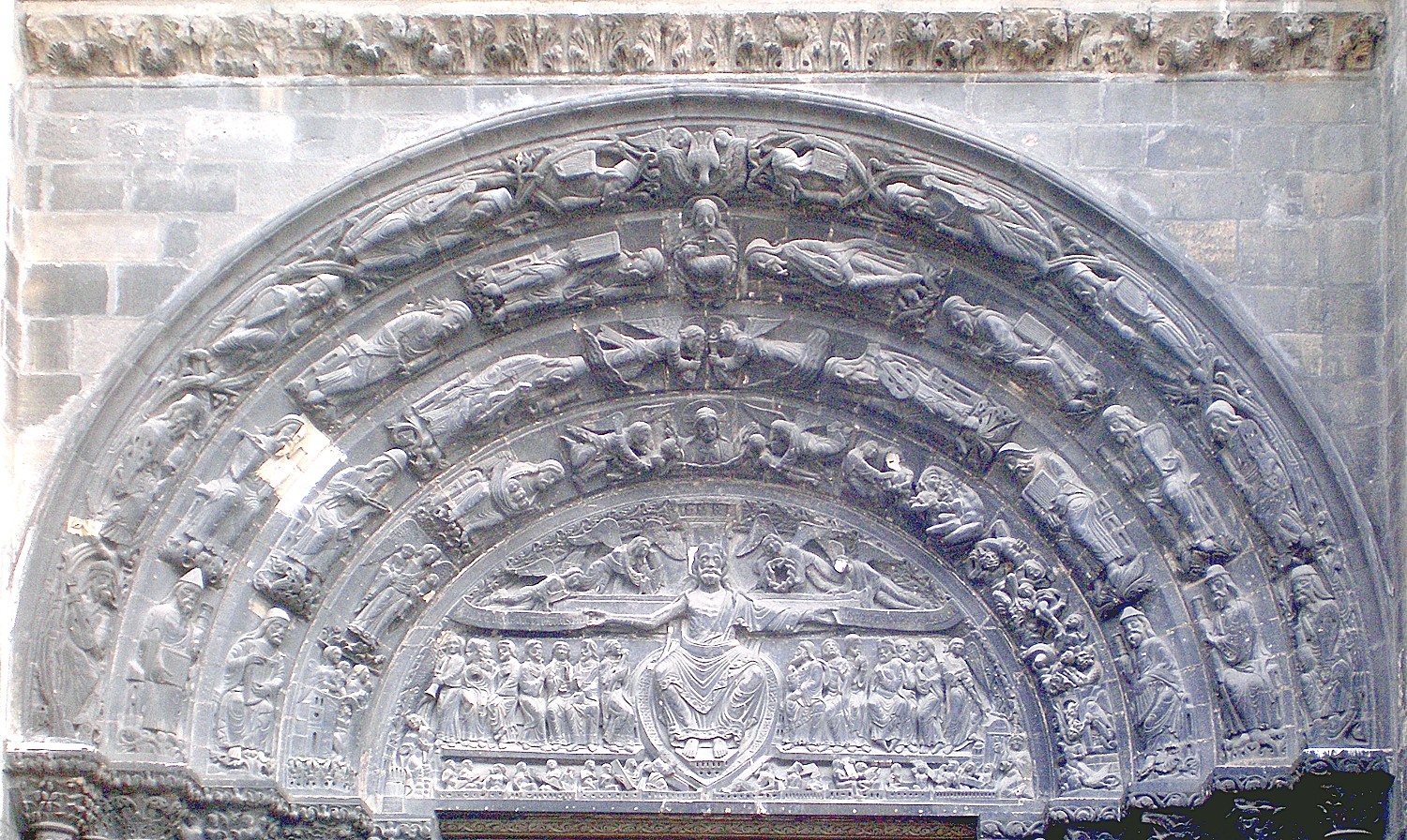
Tympanum of the portal of Last Judgement of Basilica of Saint-Denis (after 1140)

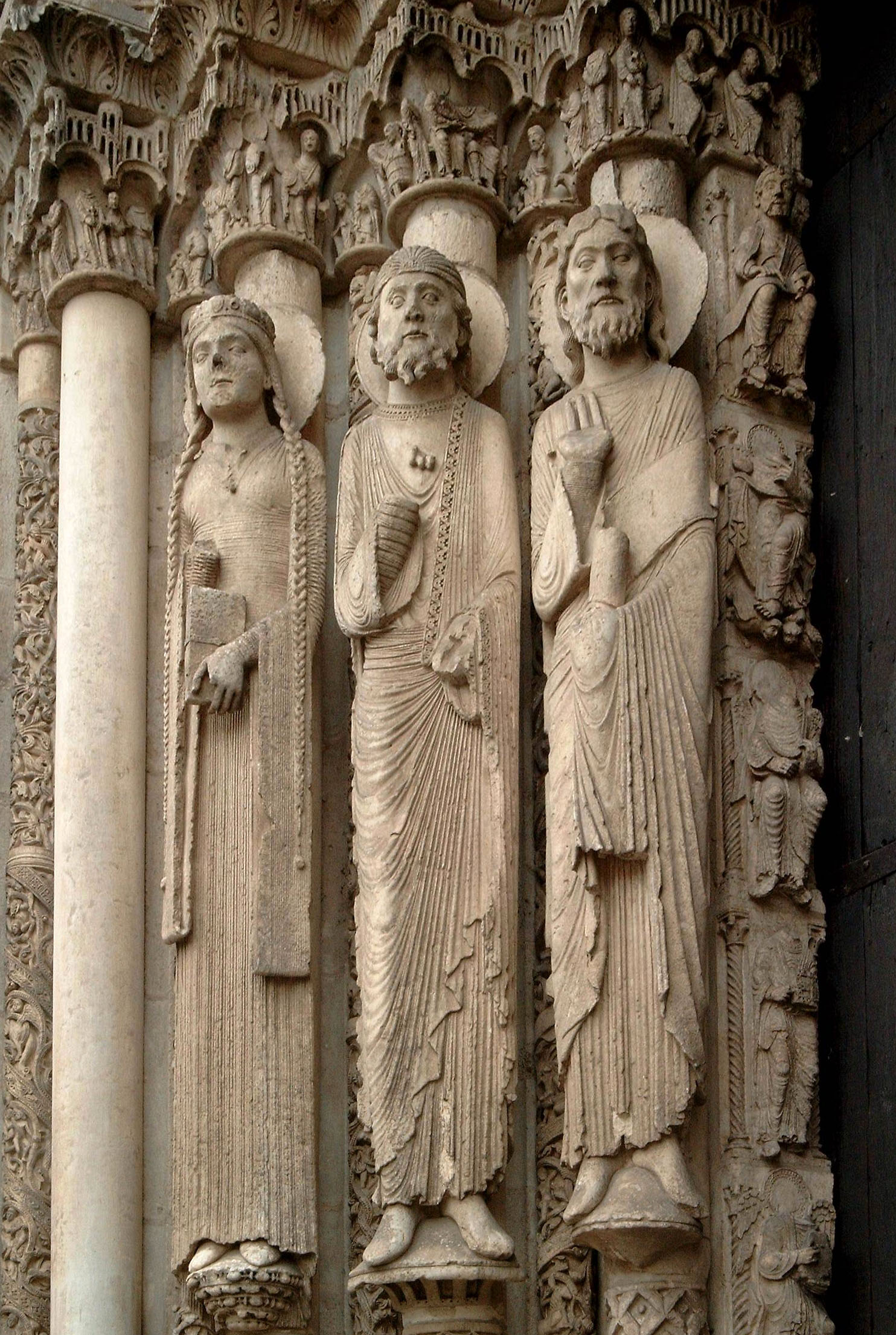
Figures on central Tympanum of Chartres Cathedral

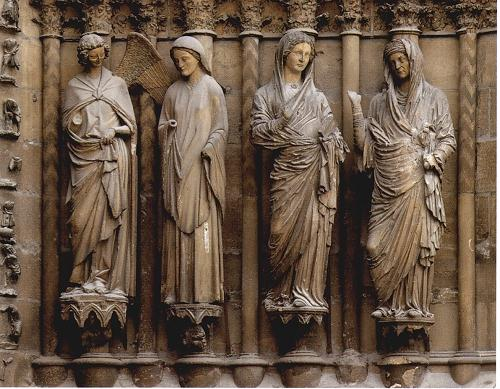
sculpture on West portal of Reims Cathedral (middle of 13th century)

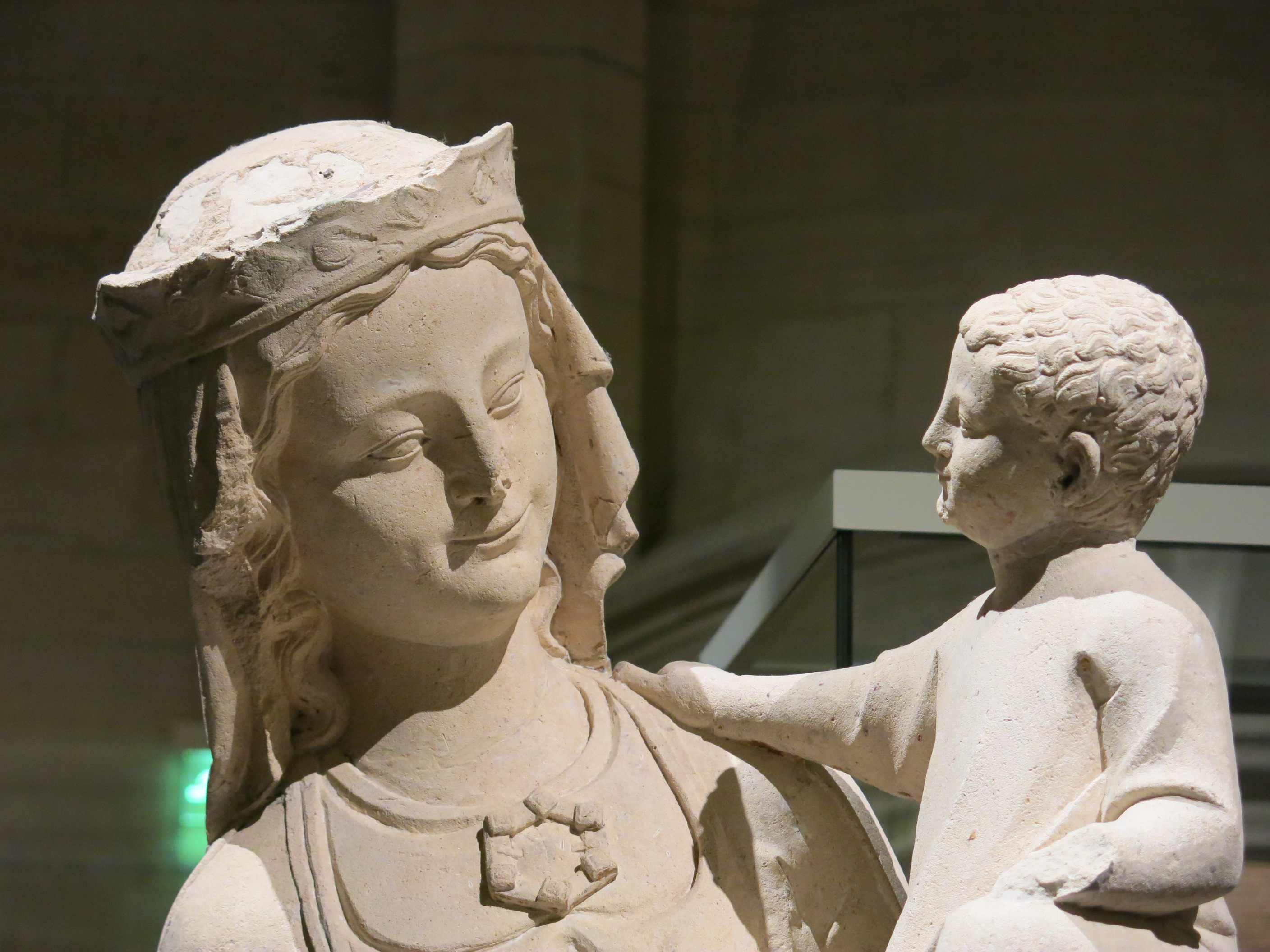
Virgin with child (mid-13th century), Musée Vivenel, Compiégne

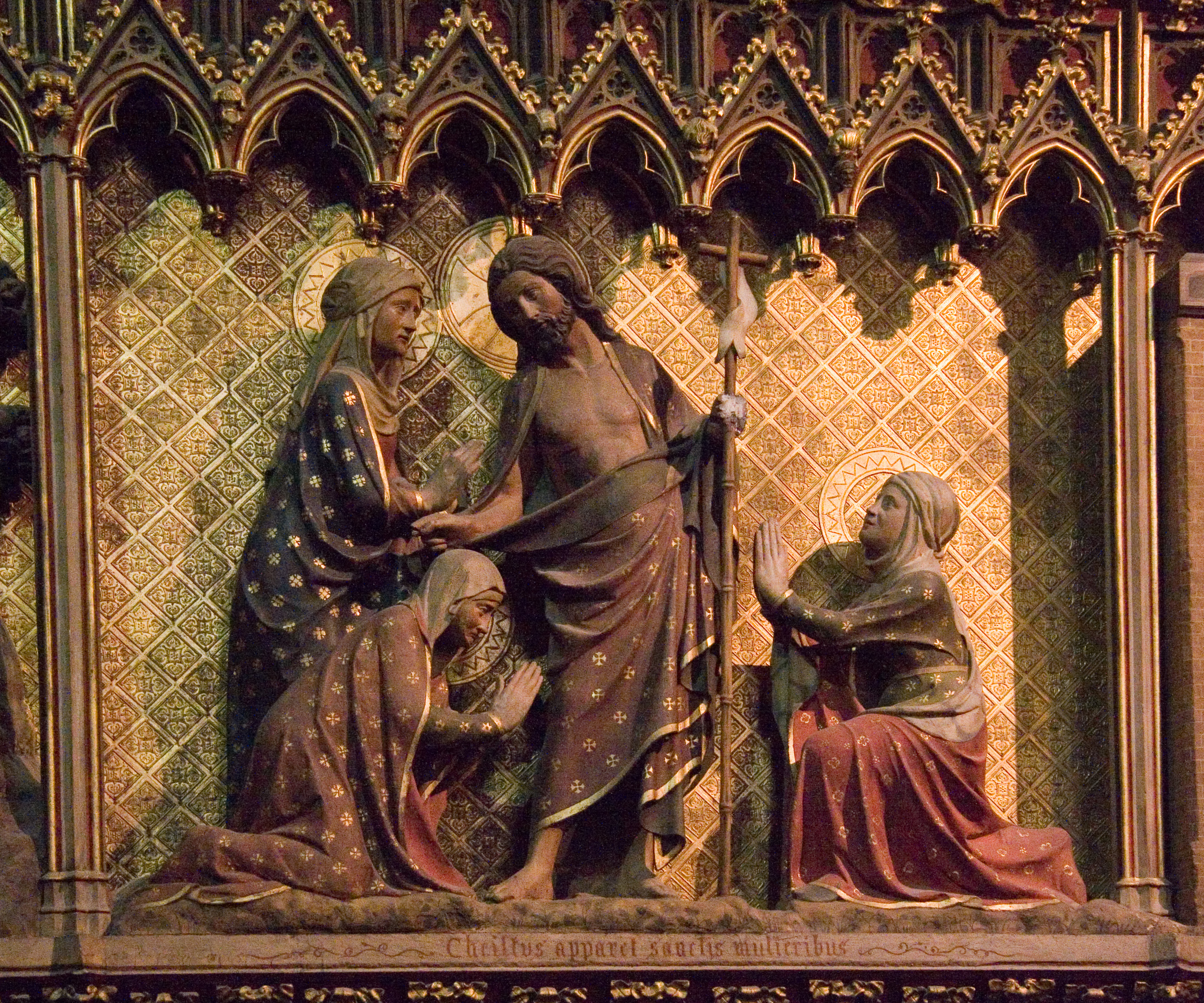
Carved polychrome choir stall in Notre-Dame Cathedral, (end of 13th century)

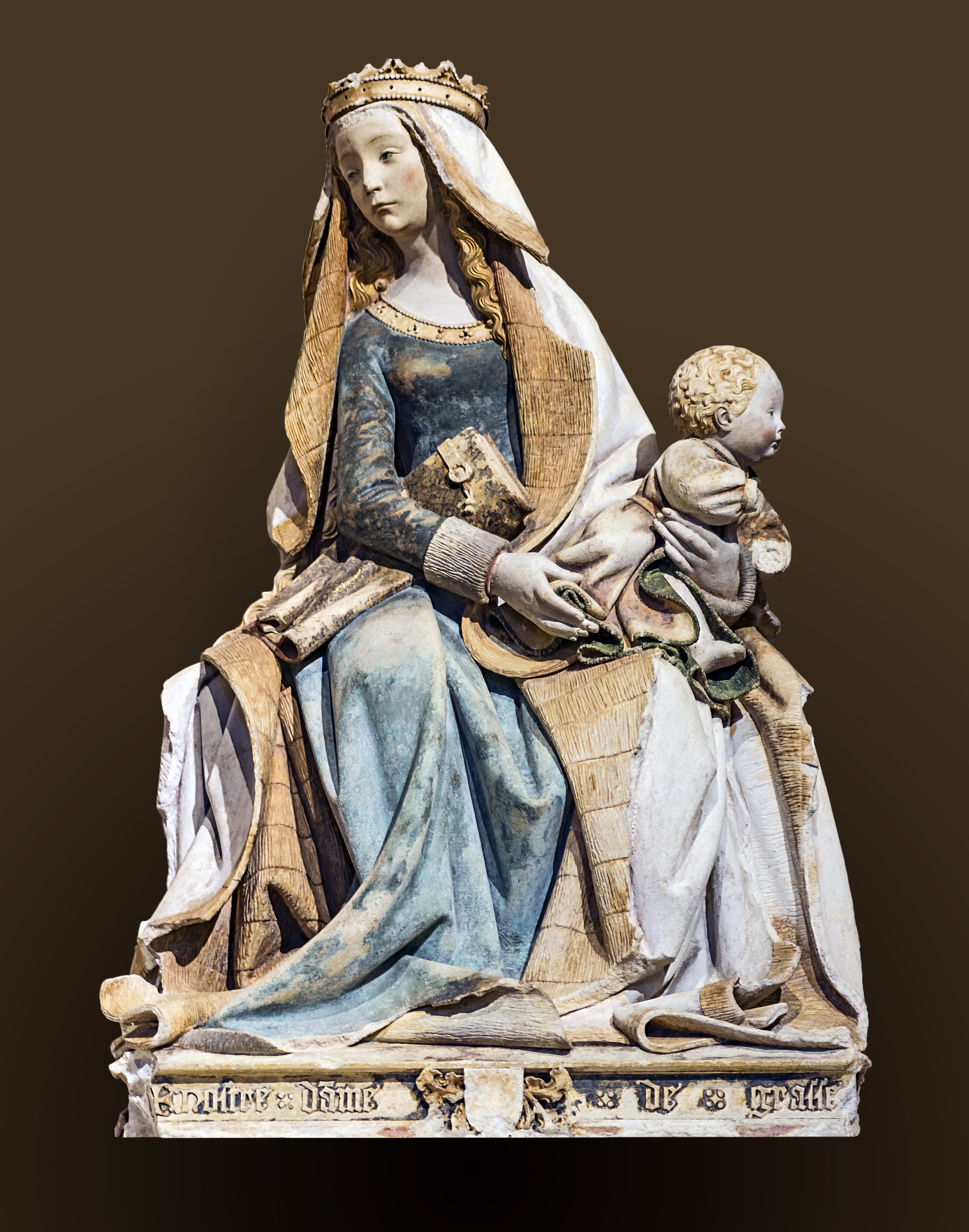
Nostre Dame de Grasse (end of 15th century), Musée des Augustins, Toulouse

== Renaissance ==
In the 14th century, Archeological excavations in Rome and Florence led to the rediscovery of classical statuary, and the beginning of the Renaissance. Small bronze models of the classical works were imported and sold to wealthy French patrons, and French artists began to visit Italy to see for themselves. Charles VIII brought artists from Naples and Florence to Paris. Louis XII employed Italian sculptors. Francis I invited Leonardo da Vinci, Francesco Primaticcio and Benvenuto Cellini to work in France. They formed new style and school of art, the School of Fontainebleau, for the decoration of his chateau. He sent Primaticcio back to Italy to acquire molds of classical sculpture; he returned with 133 cases of sculpture. Despite this Italian competition, the best-known French sculptors, including Ligier Richier and Michel Colombe, continued to work in the traditional Gothic style, particularly in the statuary of tombs. Michel Colombe made an elegant Tomb of Francis II, Duke of Brittany (1502–07) with a statue of his daughter, Anne of Brittany, as Prudence at his side. Richier made a particularly Gothic sculpture of a martyred saint, the Cadaver Tomb of René of Chalon portraying René of Chalon as he would look three years after his death, a decayed corpse holding his own heart in his hand.

The first major French sculptor of the Renaissance was Jean Goujon (1510–1565), also a noted graphic illustrator, whose work in bas-relief perfectly captured and refined the Italian style. He arrived in Paris in 1544 and worked closely with the architect Pierre Lescot on the decoration of the Louvre, the Fontaine des Innocents, several figures for the facade of the Hôtel de Ville, Paris, and a group of bas reliefs of the Four Seasons, made for the courtyard façade of the hôtel of Jacques de Ligeris, now in the Musee Carnavalet in Paris. Goujon was a Protestant, and in 1562, when the French Wars of Religion began, he left France for Italy, where he is believed to have died in 1563.

Other notable sculptors of the French Renaissance included Pierre Bontemps (1505–1568), collaborator with architect Philibert Delorme. He was the principal creator of the sculpture of the tomb of Francis I, which displayed his precise knowledge of anatomy and his ability to vividly portray a multitude of battles, scenes and personalities, in fifty-four separate bas-reliefs around the base of the tomb.

Germain Pilon (1535–1590) was another major figure. He was a pupil of Bontemps, a fierce proponent of the Catholic side in the Wars of Religion and Counter-Reform. He was also an excellent portraitist and student of anatomy and detail. His major works included a monument for the heart of Henry II, based on a drawing of Francesco Primaticcio, the tombs of Henry II and Catherine de Medicis, and a variety of other religious works.

French sculpture at the end of the 16th century was based largely on ancient Roman models. Bartélémy Prieur was a student of Pilon and royal sculptor of Henry IV, and Jacques Sarrazin was court sculptor for Louis XIII. They studied in Rome and copied Roman models. The two brothers François Angiers and Michel Angiers were also longtime students in Rome. Their work was highly refined and came close to perfection in execution, but lacked originality, emotion or drama. The major stylistic innovation in French sculpture was the introduction of the equestrian statue of the King on horseback, designed for placement in central city squares. The first example was the bronze equestrian statue of Henry IV, with the horse by Jean de Boulougne, a French sculptor employed in Florence by the Medicis, and the King by Ferdinando Tacca, his student. The statue was destroyed during the French Revolution.

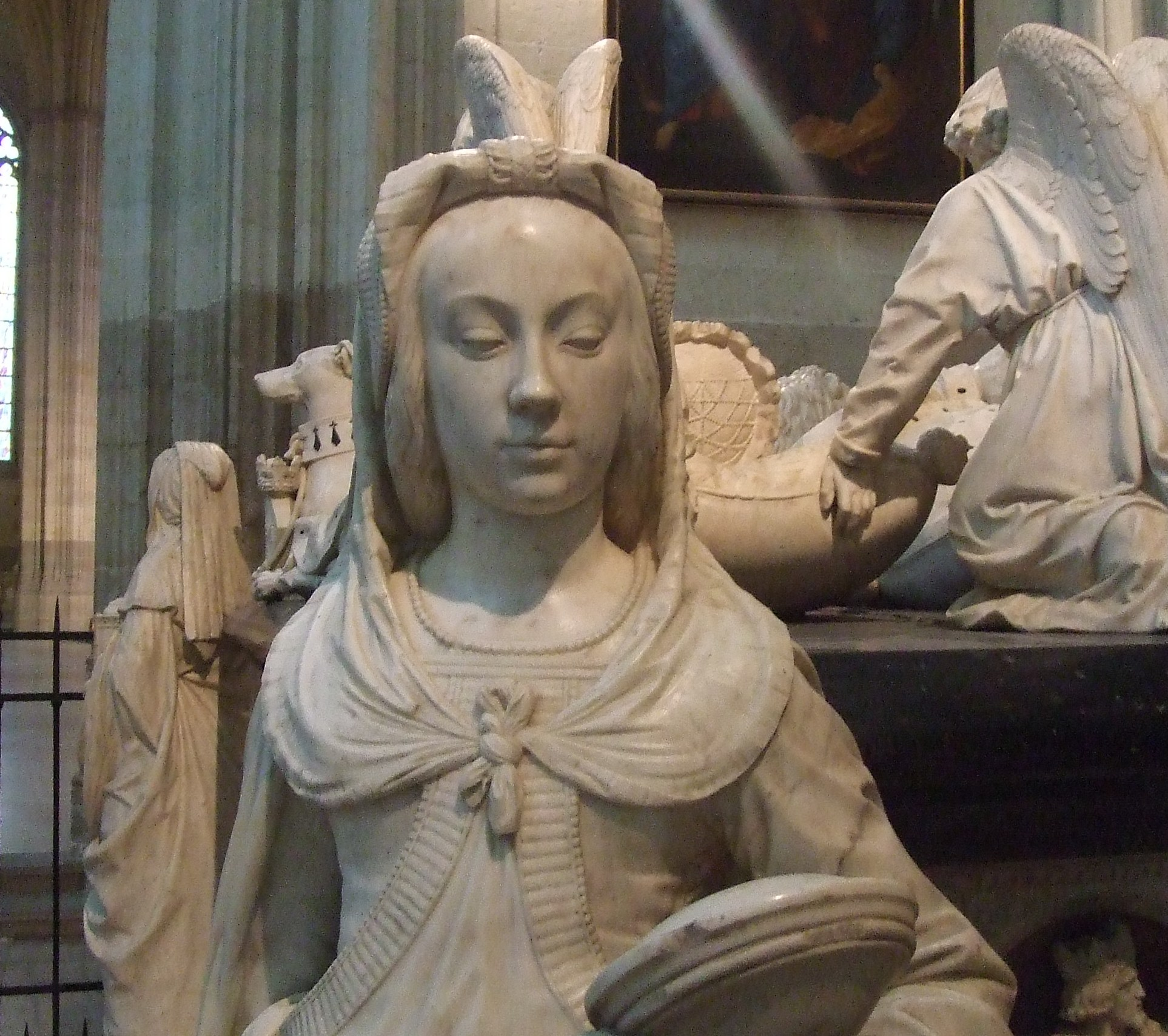
Anne of Brittany as "Prudence" by Michel Colombe (1502–07)

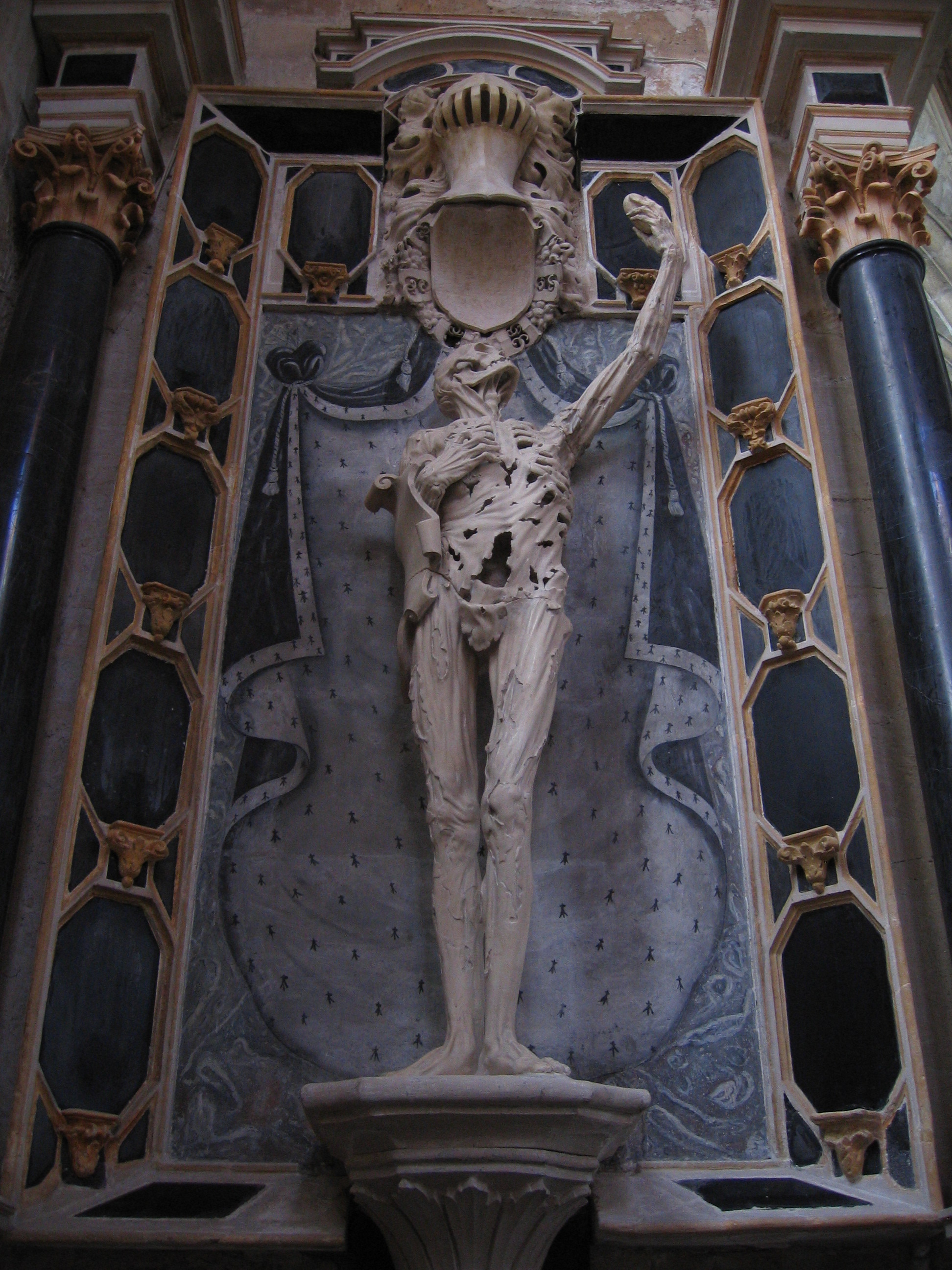
René de Chalon by Ligier Richier (1544–57)

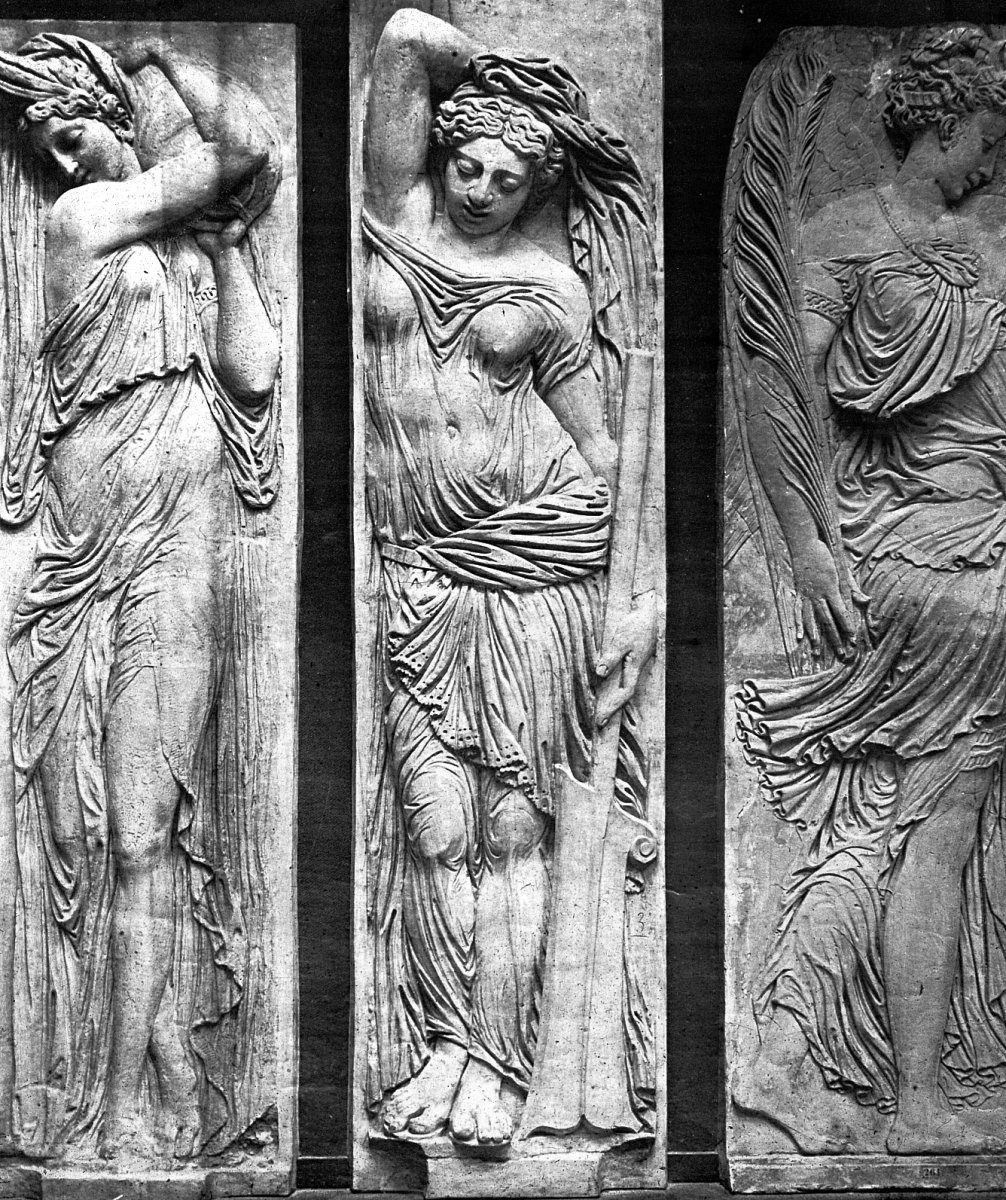
Stone reliefs of nymphs by Jean Goujon, Fontaine des Innocents (1547–50)

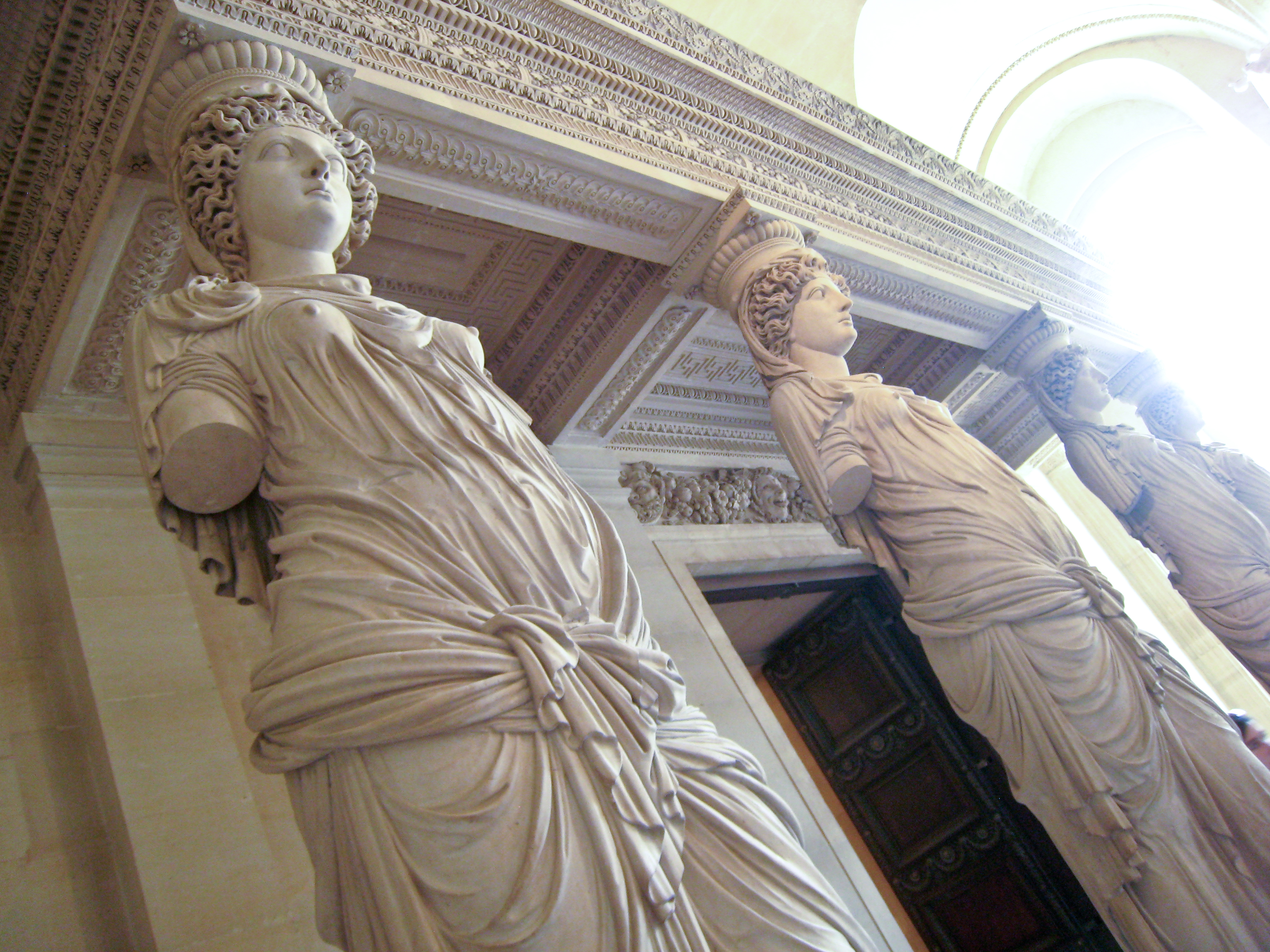
Caryatides, Salon des Caryatides, Louvre by Jean Goujon (1550–51)

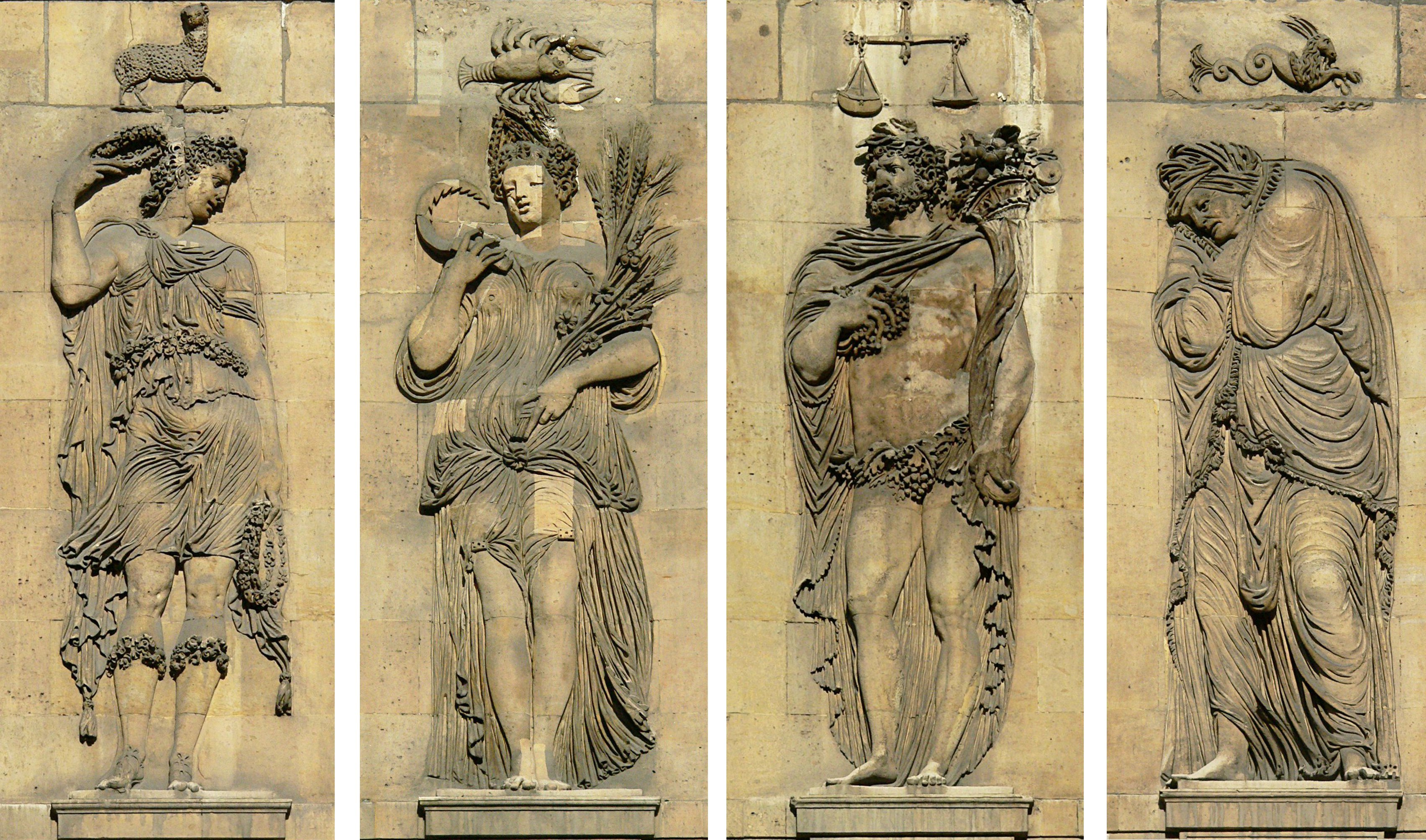
The Four Seasons by Jean Goujon, (c.1547)
Musée Carnavalet, Paris

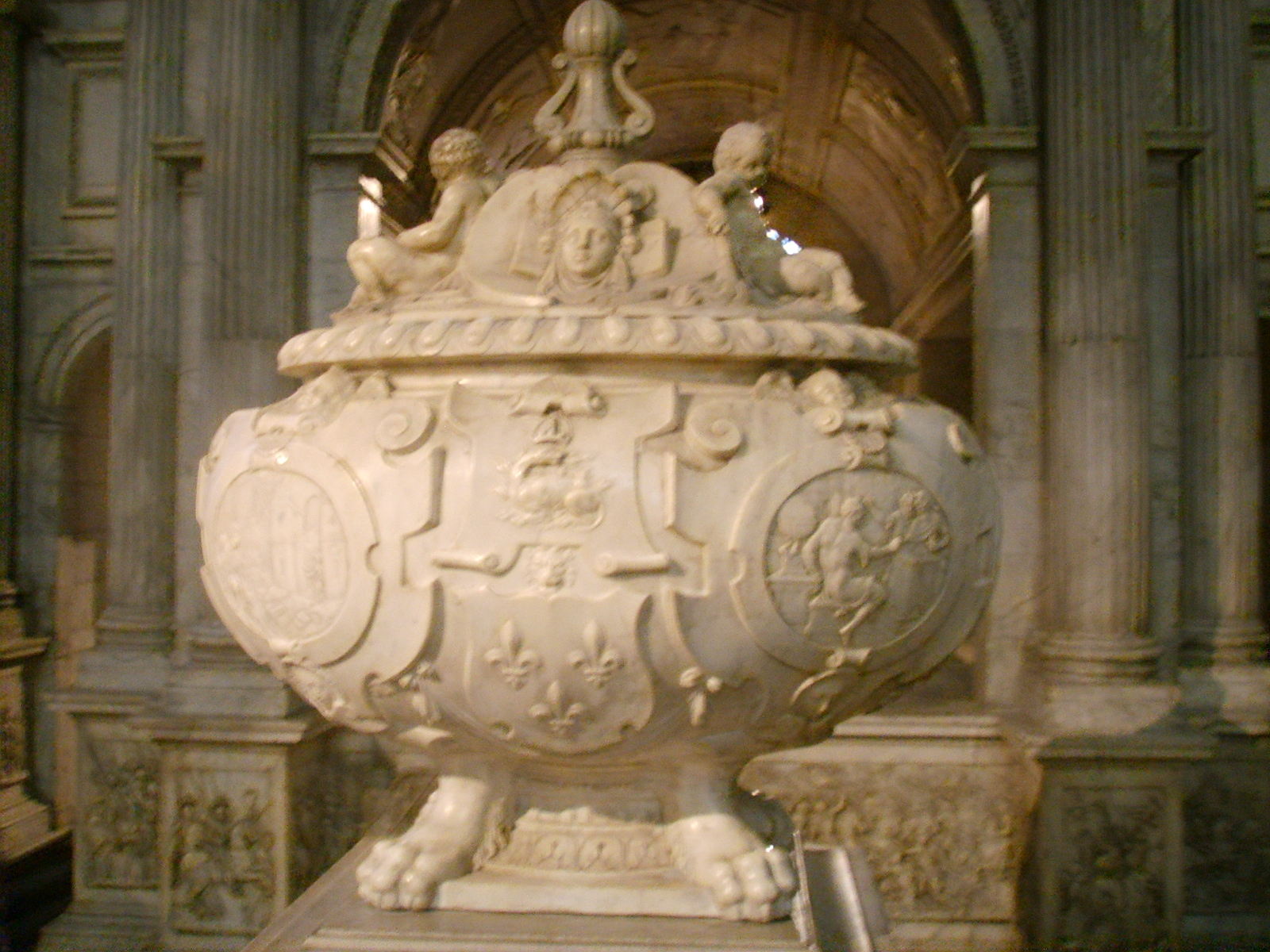
Funeral urn for the heart of Francis I, by Pierre Bontemps Basilica of Saint Denis

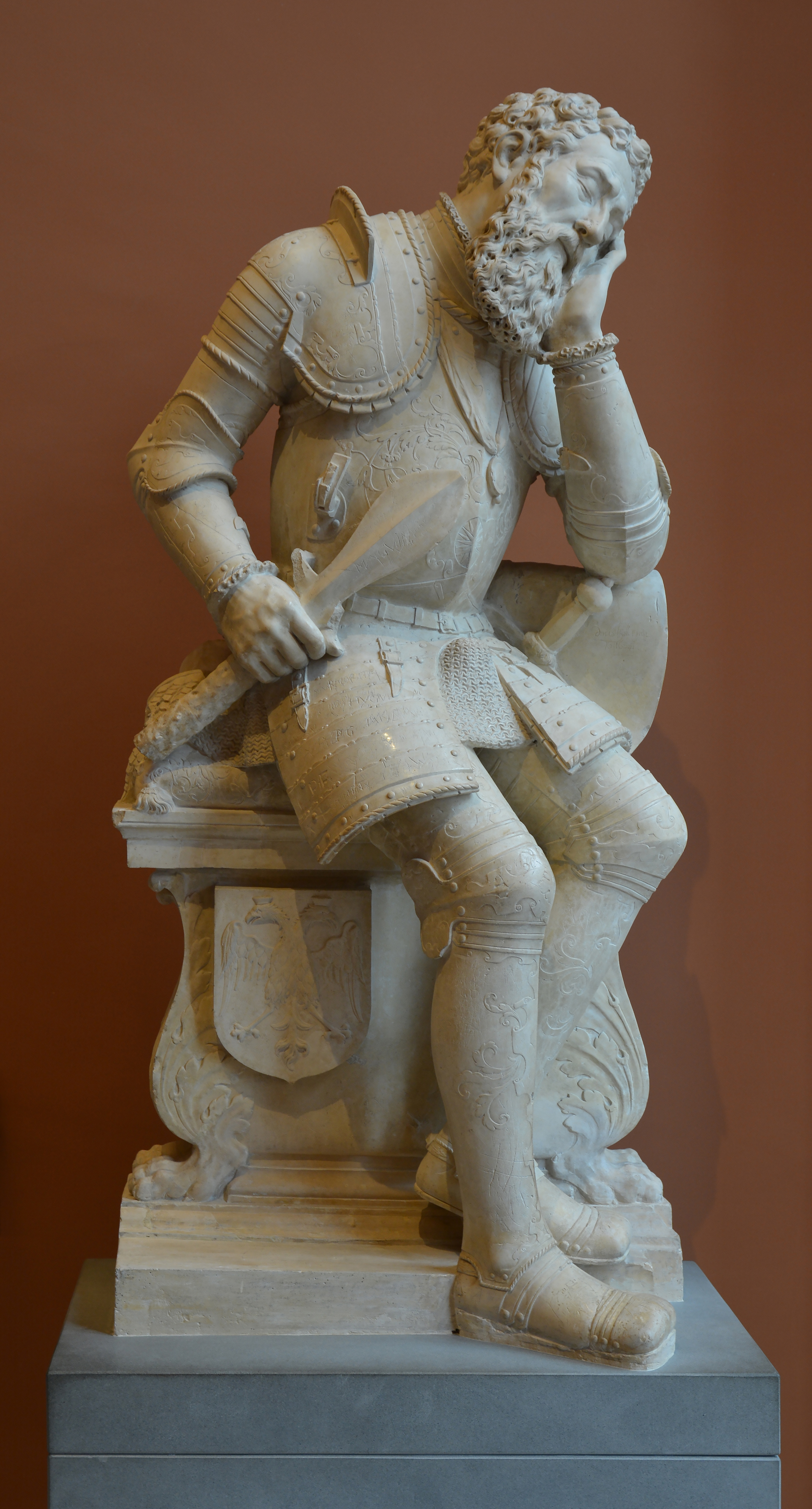
Figure from the tomb of Charles de Maigny by Pierre Bontemps, The Louvre

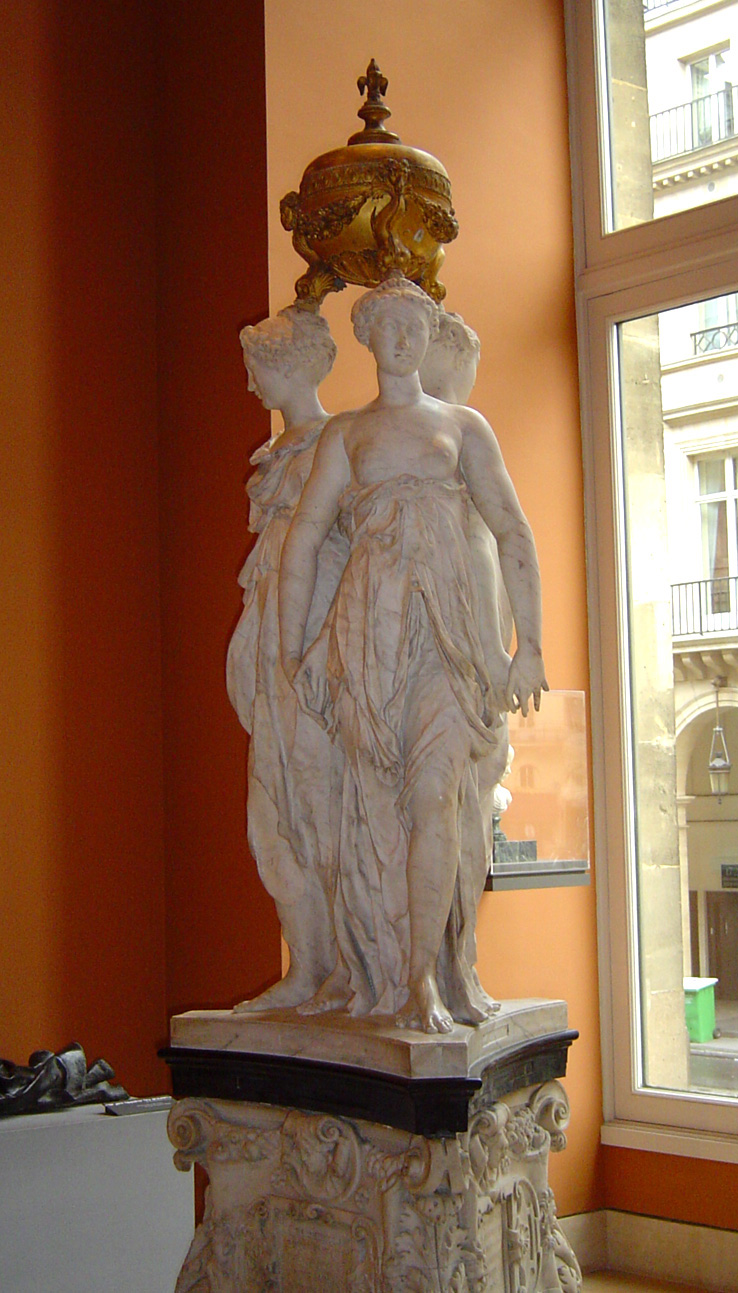
Monument containing the heart of Henry II of France by Germain Pilon

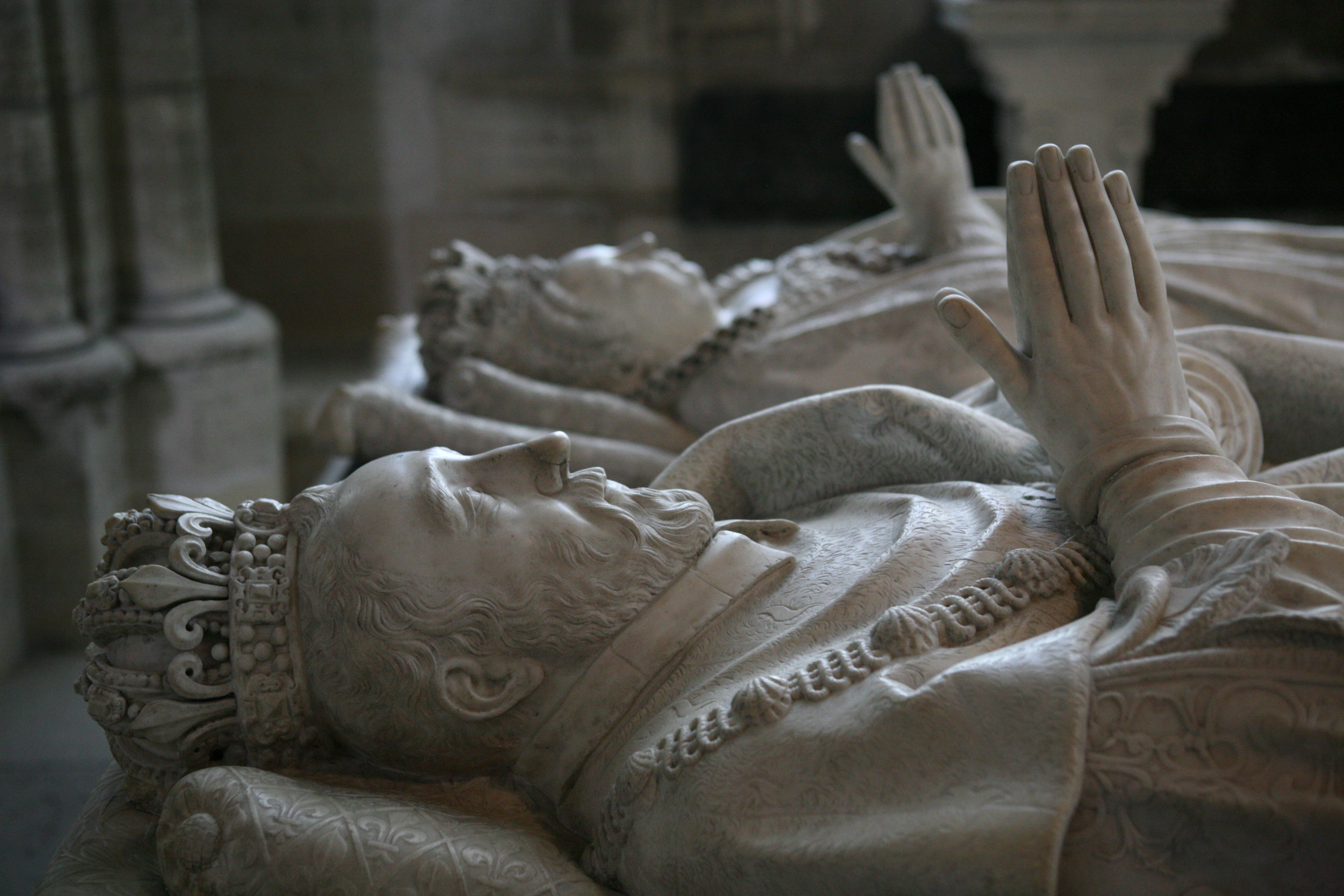
Tomb of Henry II of France and Catherine de Medicis, at the Basilica of Saint-Denis, by Germain Pilon

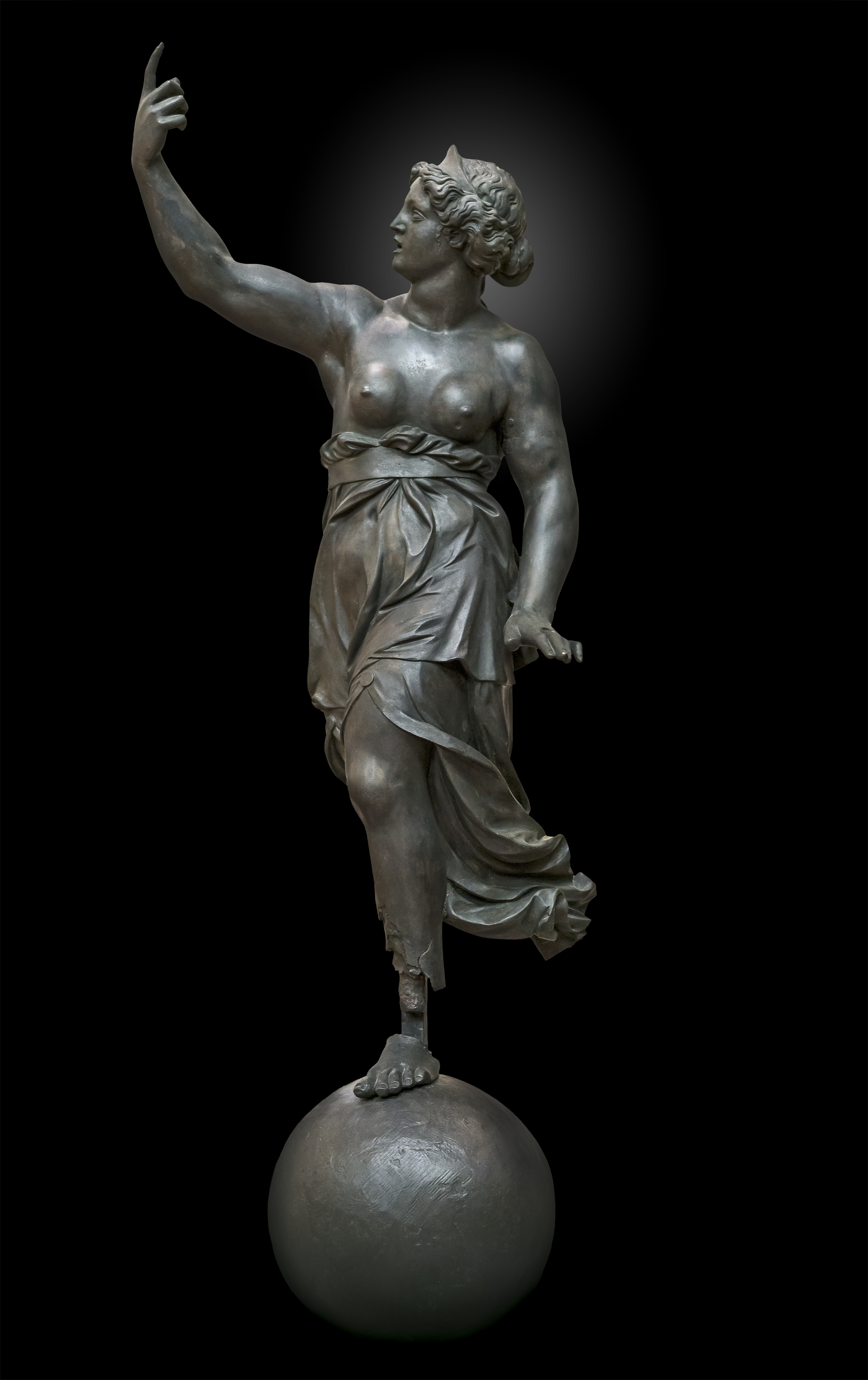
Lady Tholose by Jean Rancy, is a bronze designed to be an allegory of the city of Toulouse (1550).

== The 17th century and the Age of Louis XIV ==
The reign of Louis XIV (1643–1715) largely coincided with the era of Baroque sculpture, but the French King resisted the Baroque style. The great master of Baroque sculpture, Bernini, made one trip to Paris, and criticized the work of French sculptors as "a style that is small, sad, and gloomy." He made a statue of the King, saw his plan for facade of the Louvre rejected, and departed after six months. Louis XIV and his ministers instead used a more classical style of sculpture as method of illustrating the majesty of the King and his reign. The French Royal Academy of Painting and Sculpture had been created in 1648. The students were given as their guide the King's declaration: "I confide in you the thing most precious in the world; my fame." The King launched one of the largest sculptural projects ever, the decoration of the Palace of Versailles and its vast gardens and numerous fountains. Most of the leading French sculptors were occupied in making statuary for Versailles. The royal artist Charles Le Brun assigned the subjects, the sculptors the models, they were approved by the King, and full-scale models in plaster were created for display in the park. After a period of months or years, the final works were then cast in bronze or carved of marble.

The major sculptors who decorated the gardens included François Girardon (1628–1715), Antoine Coysevox (1640–1720) and Jean-Baptiste Tuby (1635–1700). Coyseyvox, besides making fountains, produced very fine portrait busts of the King and his chief ministers. He also created sculptures portraying members of the Court or nobility in mythological costume, such as Duchesse of Burgundy represented as the Goddess of the hunt, Diane. Nearly all the major sculptors of the period, including Coysevox, Girardon, Jean-Louis Lemoyne (1665–1755), and Edmé Bouchardon (1698–1762) also made monumental equestrian statues of the King for royal squares in the large cities, including Place Vendôme and Place des Victoires in Paris.

In the later years of the reign of Louis XIV, wars drained the treasury and large sculptural commissions became scarce. The King turned his attention to the decoration of his Château de Marly, built as a quieter retreat from Versailles. Statues there included works by Coysevox and his students, including Nicolas Coustou and, shortly after his reign, a famous pair of horses by Guillaume Coustou (1739–45), whose replicas now decorate the beginning of the Champs-Elysees.

Other sculptors of note during the period include Pierre Puget, from Marseille, one finest sculptors of the French Baroque style. He had studied and worked in Rome, and his works displayed movement and strong emotion, and used the figure serpentine, the upward spiral arrangement which suggested movement and lightness, which was characteristic of Italian Baroque sculpture. Seome examples, including Perseus and Andromeda 1684) and Milo of Crotone (1682) were placed in Gardens of Versailles, and are now in the Louvre.

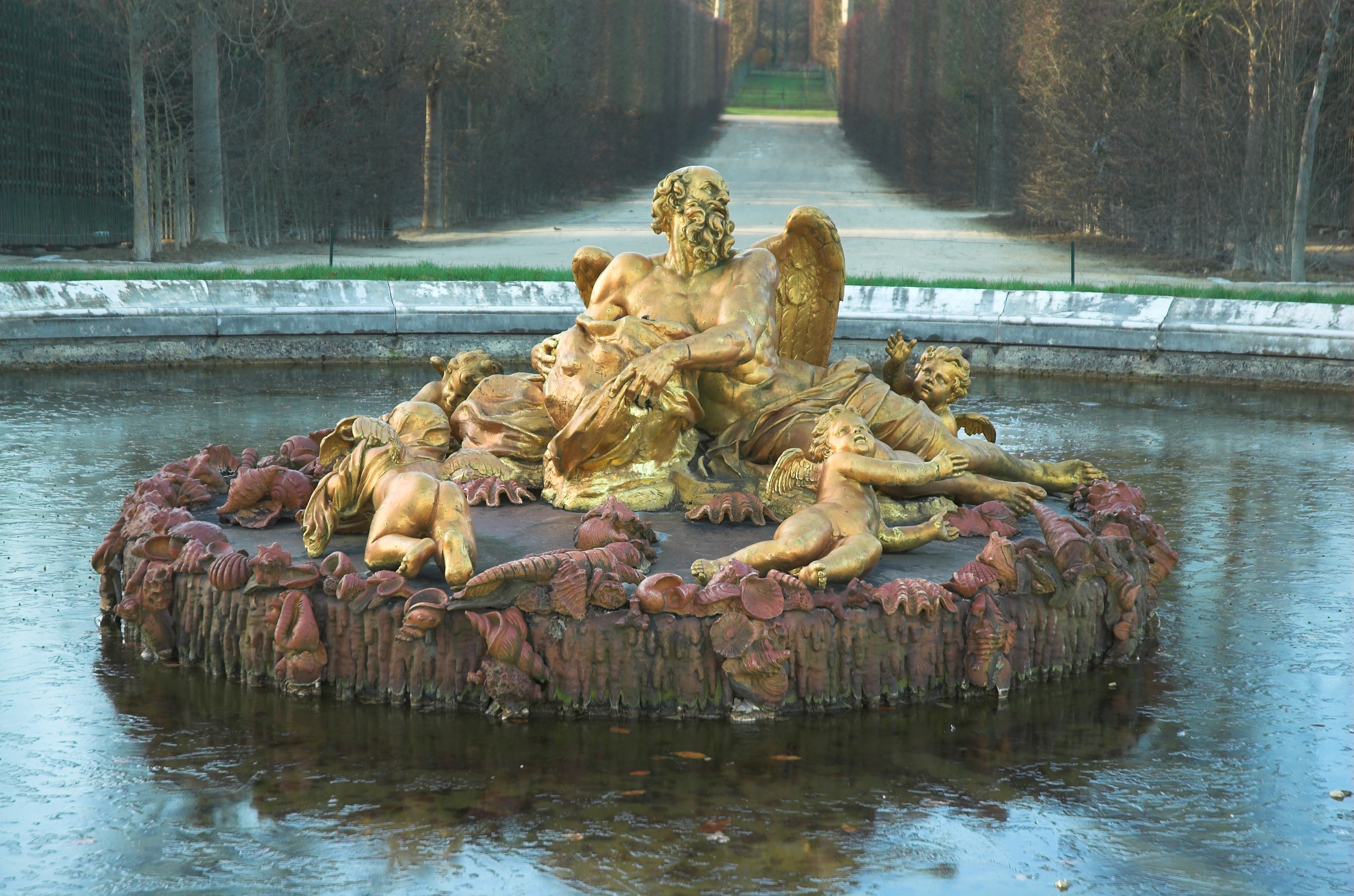
Basin of Saturn from the gardens of the Palace of Versailles, by François Girardon (1672-1677)

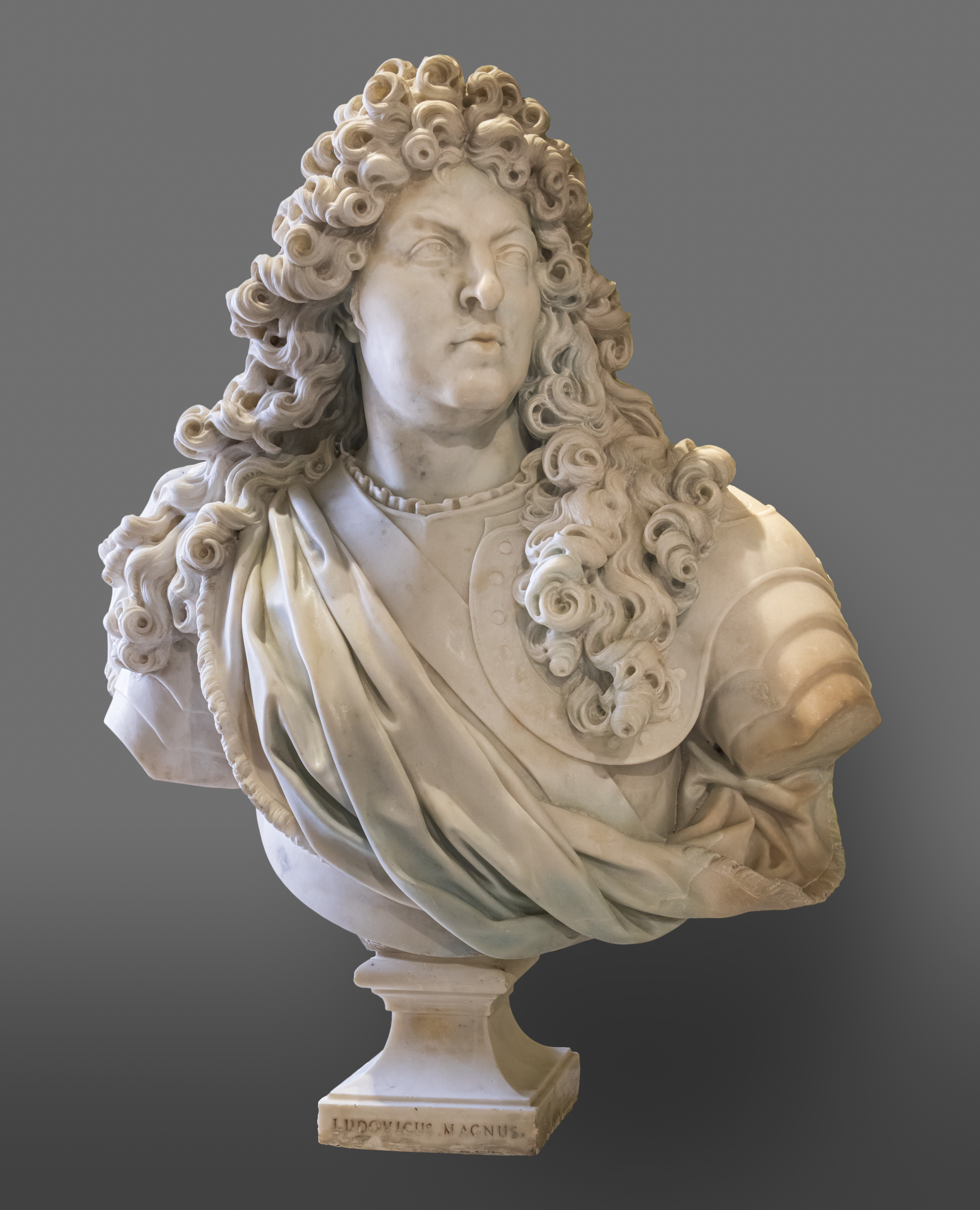
Bust of Louis XIV by Antoine Coysevox (1680) (Museum of Narbonne)

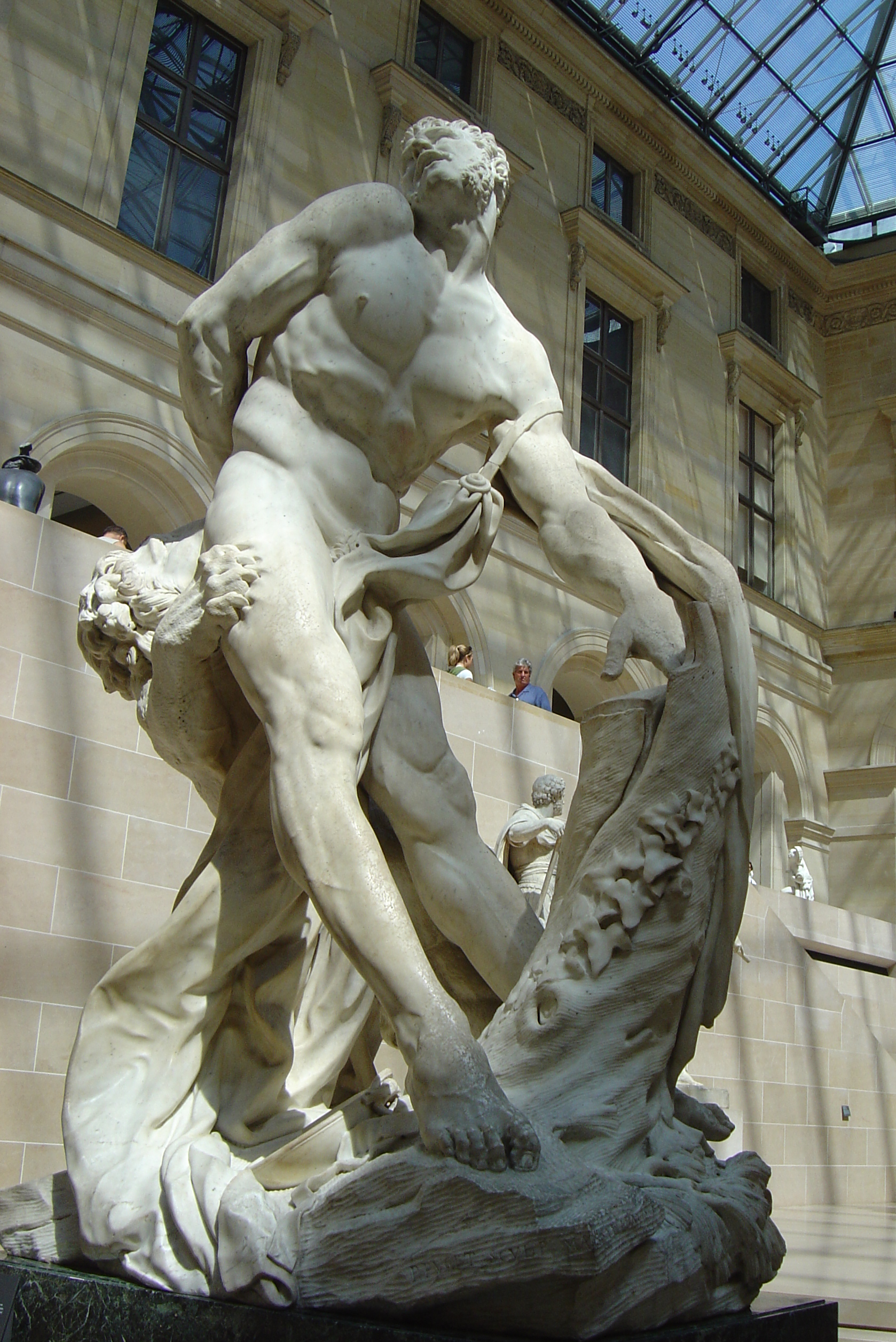
Milo of Croton by Pierre Puget (1682) (the Louvre)

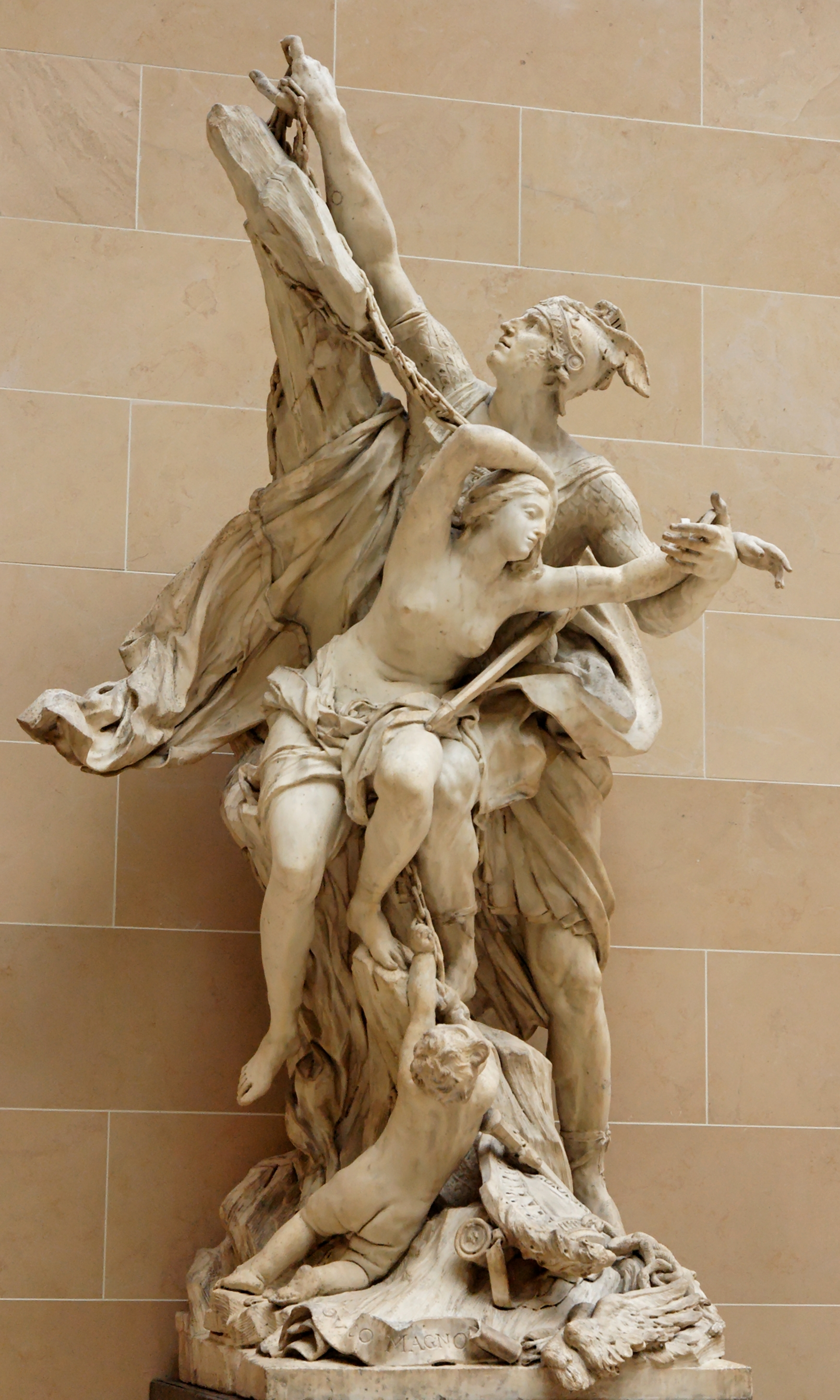
Perseus and Andromeda by Pierre Puget (1684), (the Louvre}

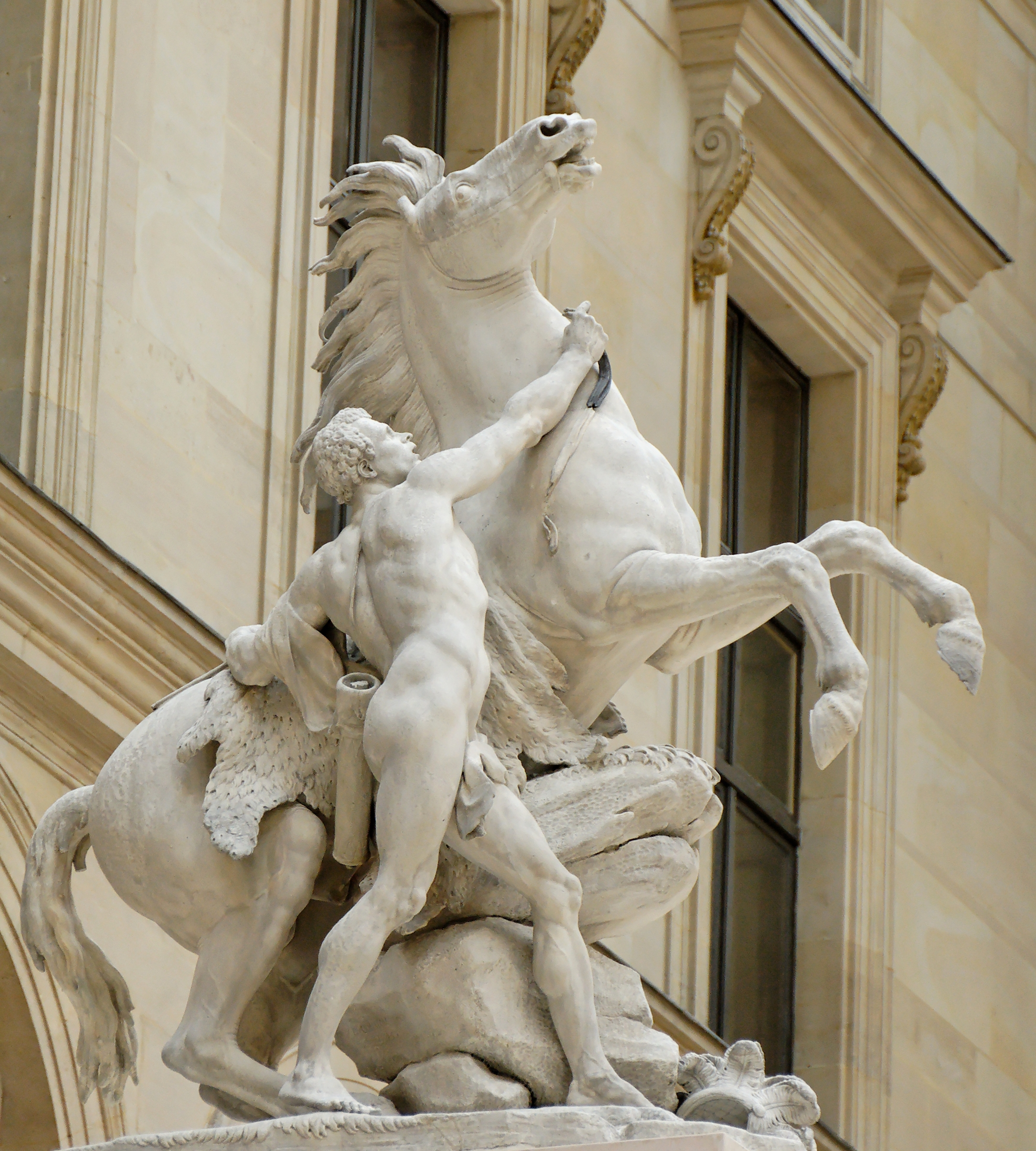
One of the Horses of Marly, by Guillaume Coustou (1739–45)

== Eighteenth Century: Neoclassicism and Rococo ==
The two dominant French sculptors of the 18th century were Jean-Baptiste Pigalle and one of his pupils, Jean-Antoine Houdon. Pigalle failed to get the Prix de Rome, but worked in the studio of François Lemoyne and went to Italy, where he made his first famous work, Mercury putting on his running shoes. He made numerous naturalistic sculptures, including Love and Friendship for Madame de Pompadour, and a monument of Louis XV on horseback for the city of Reims. He broke away from the cold formality of classicism with the Tomb of Marshal Maurice de Saxe, ordered by Louis XV, Pigalle portrayed the Marshal not lying on his tomb, but very much alive and active, surrounded by symbolic figures of characters and animals, including banners, a Dutch lioness and an English leopard, and a figure of Hercules in death, symbolizing the Marshal himself; the sculpture was a scene of theater carved in stone. Pigalle also made very fine portrait statues and busts including a nude statue of Voltaire, expressing his modesty and humanity.

Portrait busts became extremely popular. Jean-Antoine Houdon (1714–1785) was a student of Pigalle, and specialized in busts, traveling throughout Europe and to the United States, where he made accurate busts of George Washington and Benjamin Franklin. He measured the faces of his subjects for accuracy, particularly working on the details of the eyes to assure realism and a vivid expression. Augustin Pajou made five different busts of Madame Du Barry,

The reign of Louis XV and the patronage of Madame de Pompadour brought a turn toward neoclassicism. Major royal commissions usually went to the two established official royal sculptors, Jean-Louis Lemoyne (1665–1755), and his son, Jean-Baptiste Lemoyne, who was one of the finest portraitists of the period, and to Augustin Pajou, but Madame Pompadour gave commissions to a new generation of sculptors, including Étienne Maurice Falconet and Jacques Caffieri. Falconet achieved international renown; he was invited by the Russian Empress, Catherine the Great, to make a monumental statue of Peter the Great on horseback, known as The Bronze Horseman, and to Prussia to make statuary for the gardens of Frederick the Great at Sanssouci Park in Potsdam.

By the late 18th century, the cliente for sculpture had changed. The rising class of bankers, merchants and other wealthy professionals sought sculpture for their homes. Sculptors worked in a variety of mediums, including glazed porcelain from the Sevres Manufactory, which could be made in a series, and made smaller-scale bronze pieces in multiple castings. Major sculptors, including Pigalle and Falconet, made series castings for the Sevres manufactory. The theatrical rococo style was common and the themes of the small works were usually pastoral, romantic and mythological scenes, with cupids, shepherdesses and satyrs, often exuding charm and mild sensuality. Claude Michel, also known as Clodion, was a master of this genre, working mostly in terra-cotta. He composed numerous sculptures of intertwined nymphs, satyrs, and bacchantes in terra-cotta.

The French Revolution led to the destruction of sculpture on a large scale; the equestrian statues of the Kings and the sculpted facades of Gothic Cathedrals were pulled down or defaced. A few sculptors appeared during the reign of Napoleon, including Chinaud, Chaudet, and Cartellier, but their work was entirely overshadowed by the Italian sculptor Antonio Canova in the same period. Napoleon invited Canova to Paris, where Canova made a semi-nude statue of the Emperor as Mars, but he soon returned to Rome and a more appreciative audience

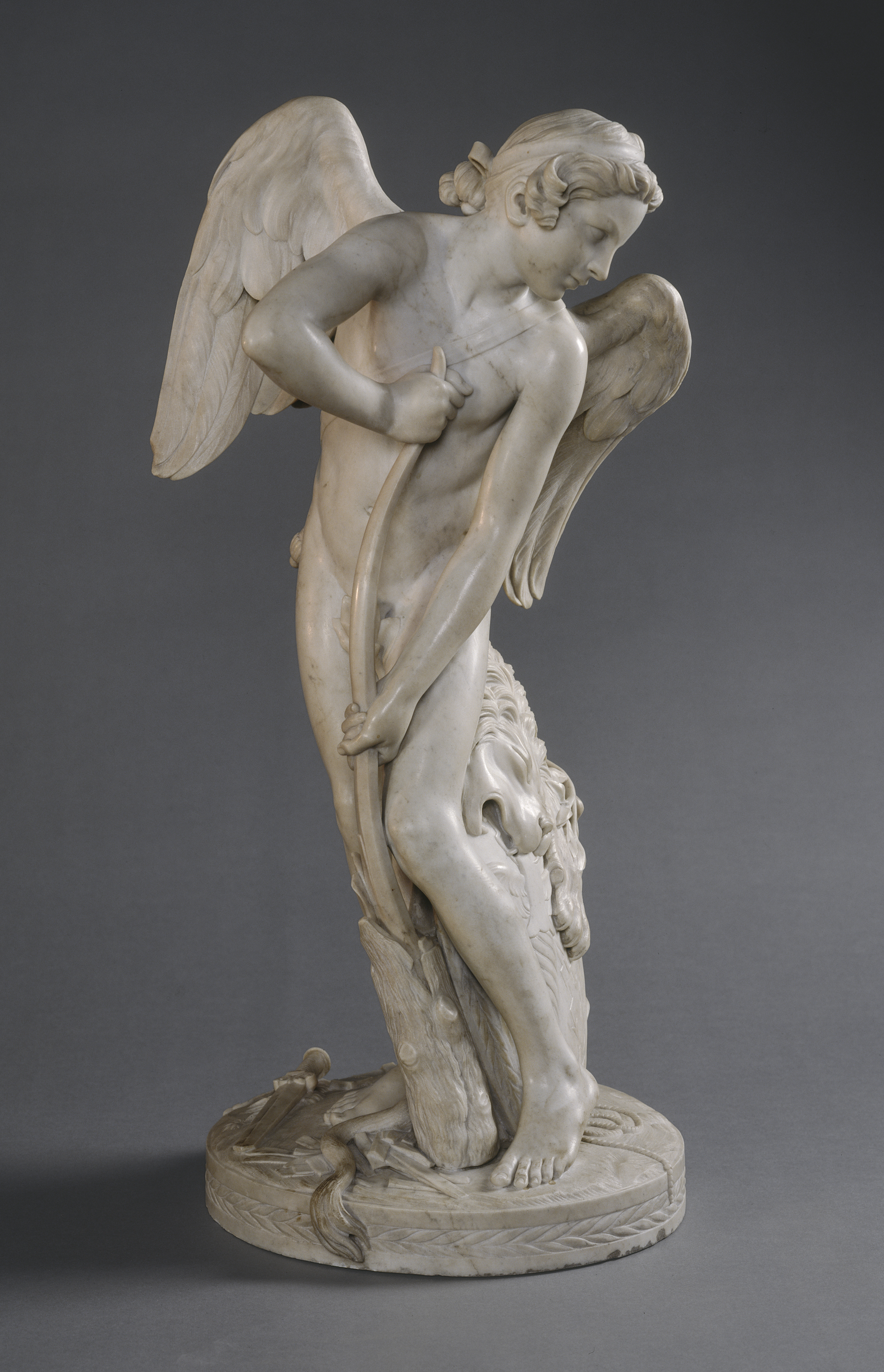
Cupid by Edmé Bouchardon National Gallery of Art (1744)

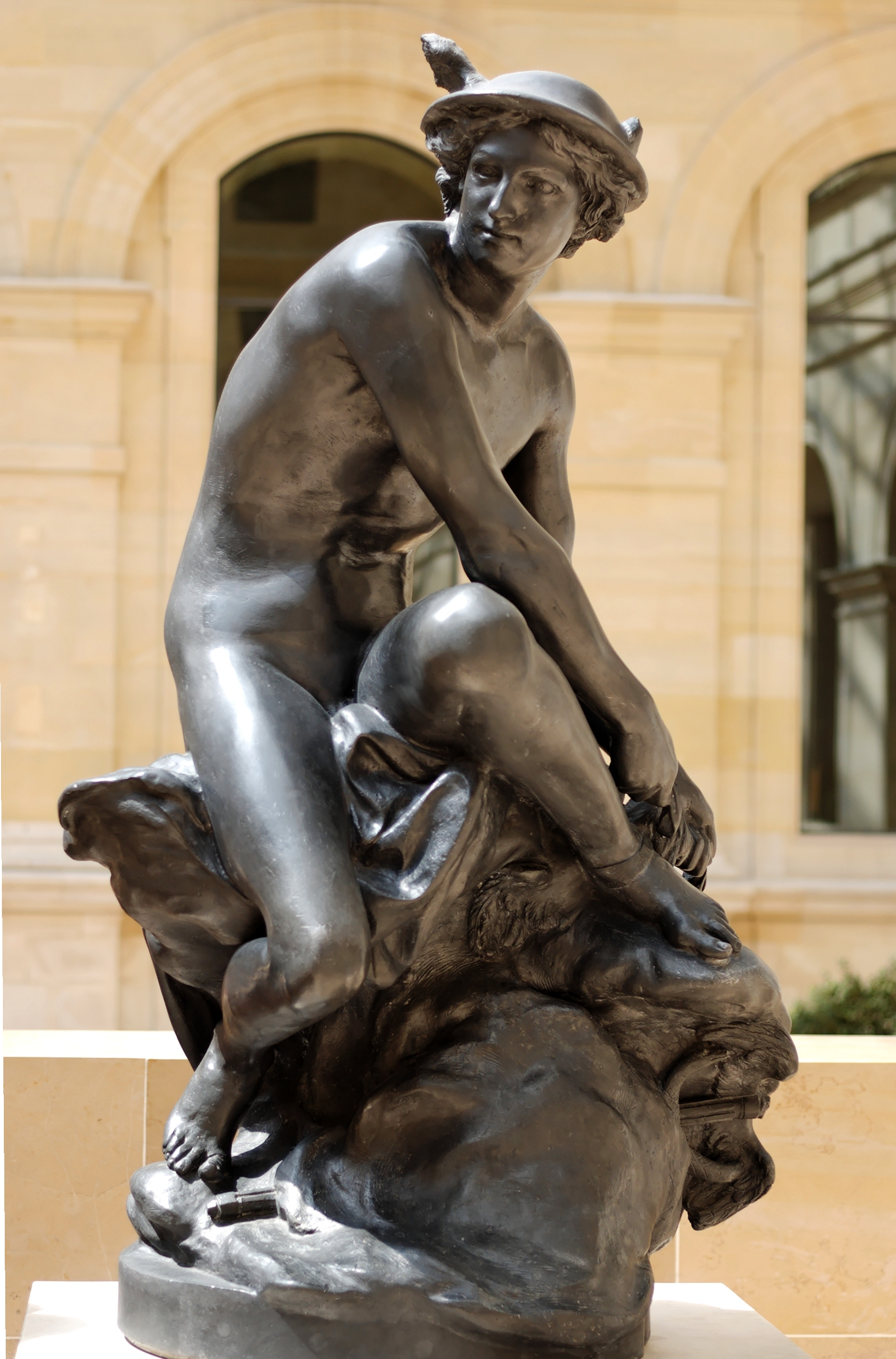
Mercury putting on his running shoes by Jean-Baptiste Pigalle, The Louvre, (1753)

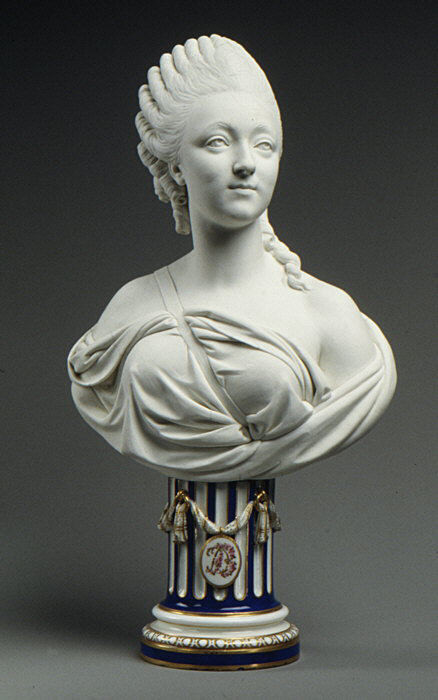
Madame du Barry in Sevres glazed porcelain by Augustin Pajou, Metropolitan Museum, (1772)

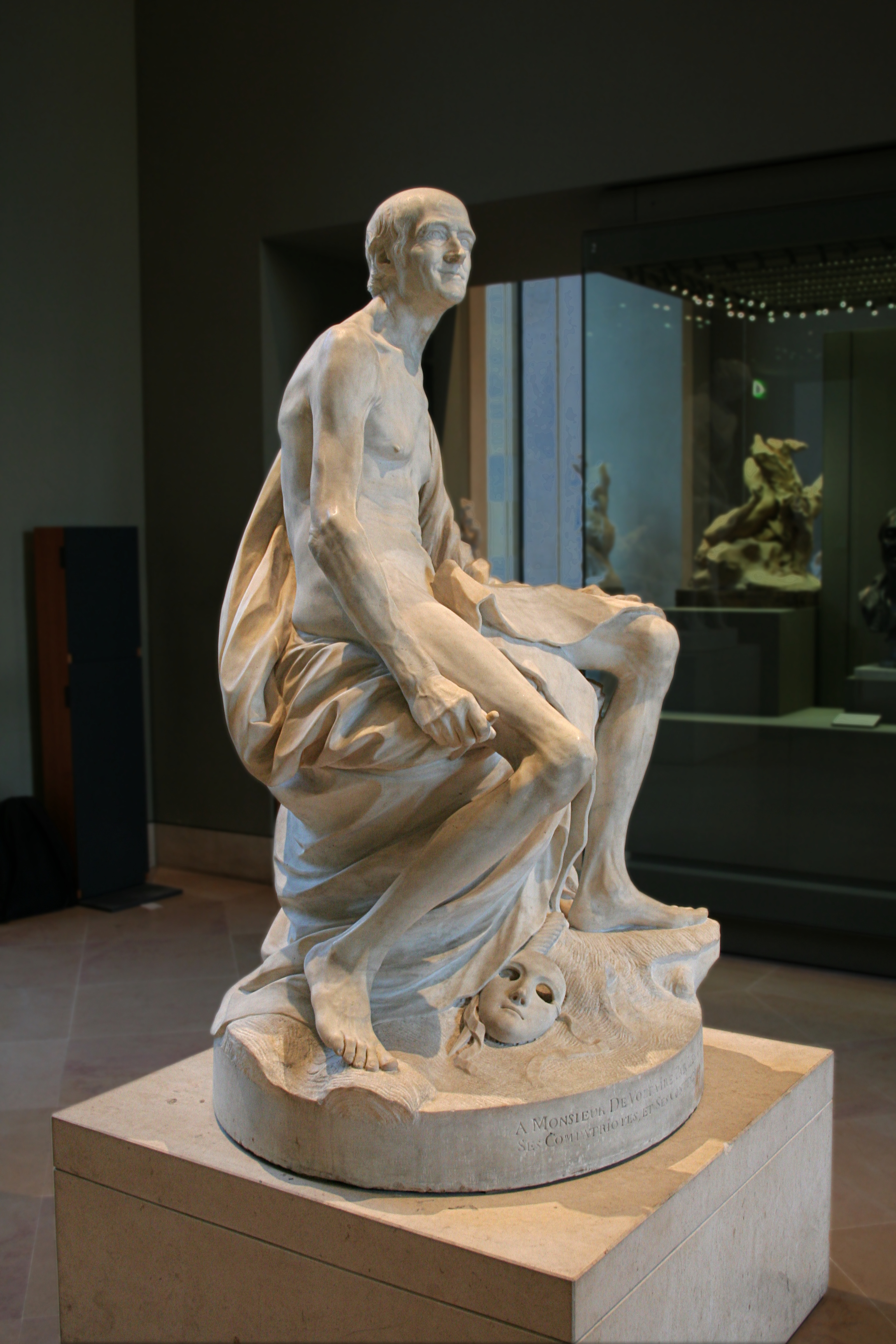
Voltaire nude by Jean-Baptiste Pigalle, he Louvre, (1777)

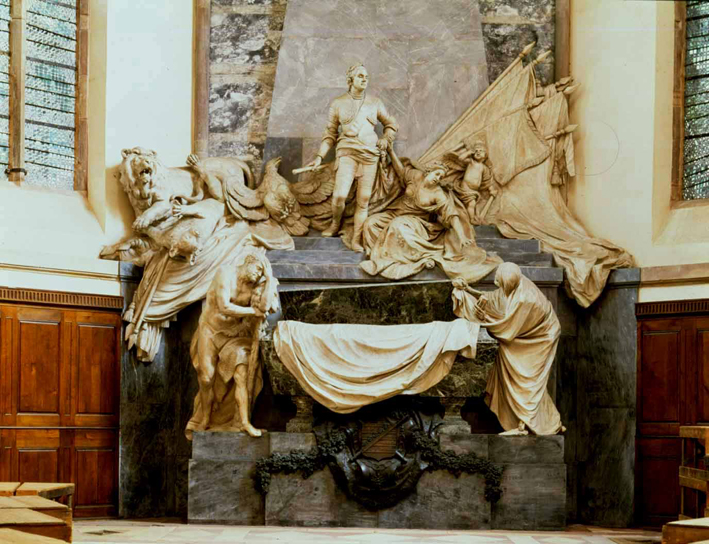
Tomb of Maurice de Saxe, by Jean-Baptiste Pigalle, Saint Thomas Lutheran Church, Strasbourg (1777)

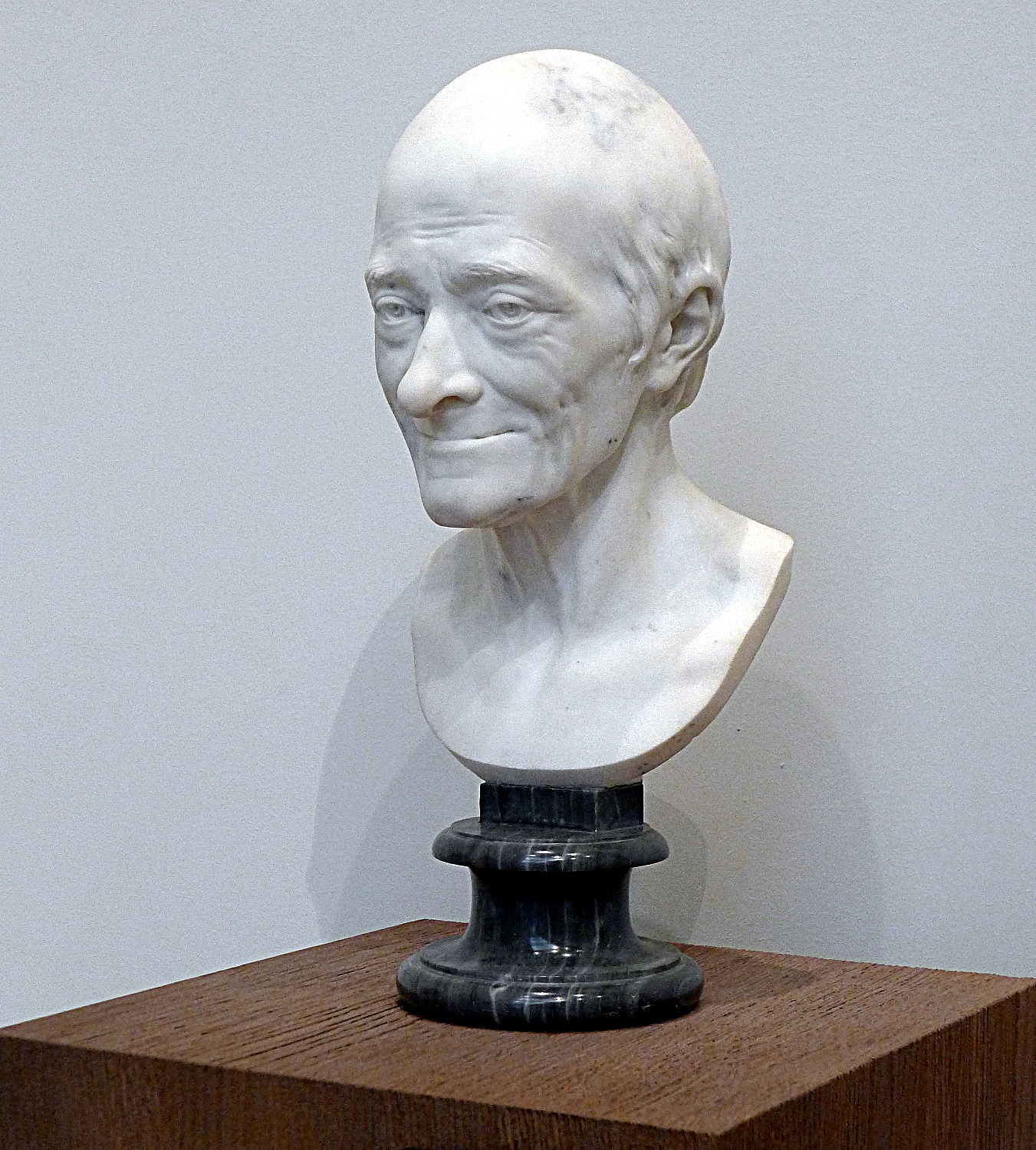
Bust of Voltaire by Jean-Antoine Houdon, Angers Museum, (1778)

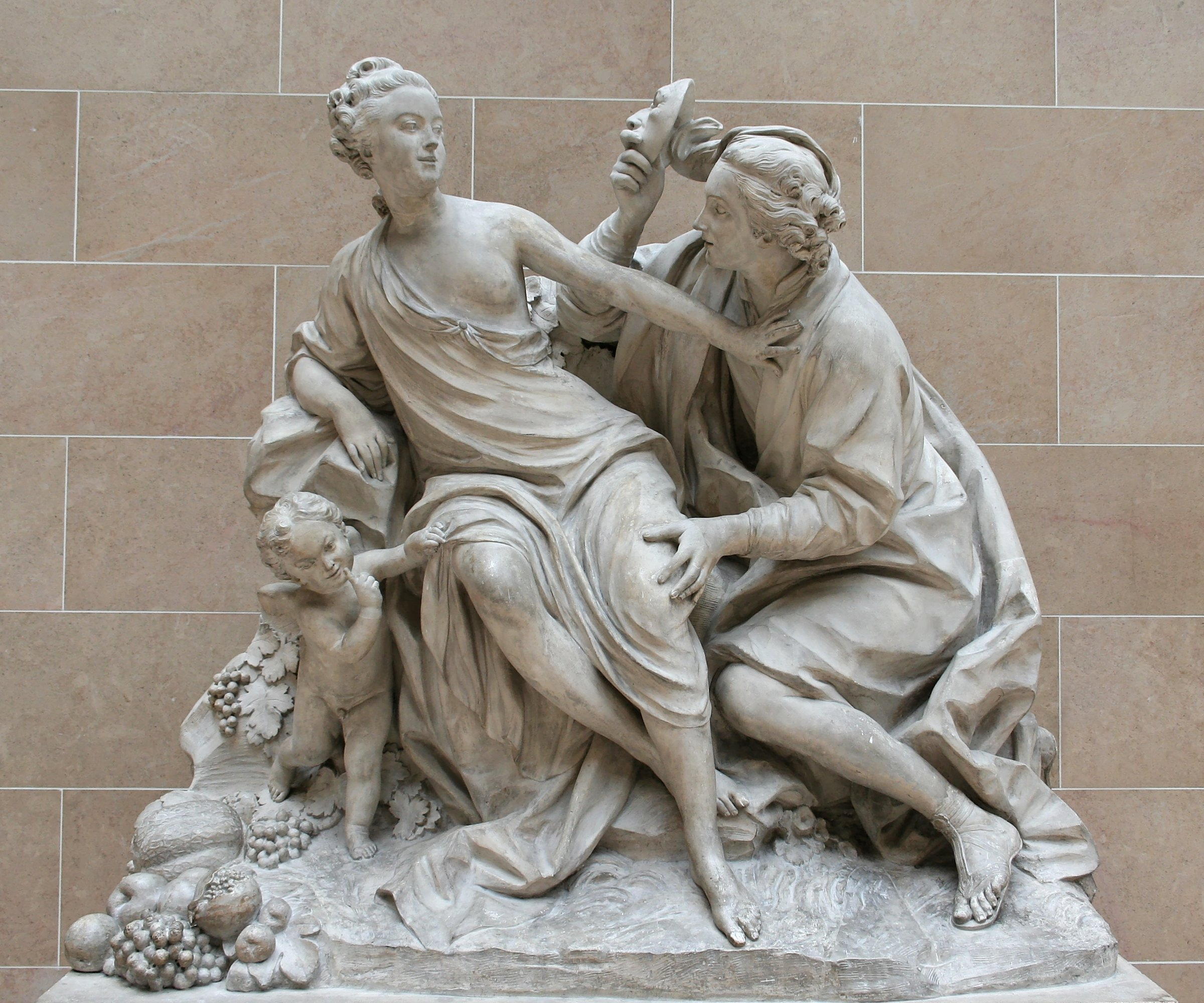
Vertumne and Pomone by Jean-Baptiste Lemoyne, The Louvre, (1780)

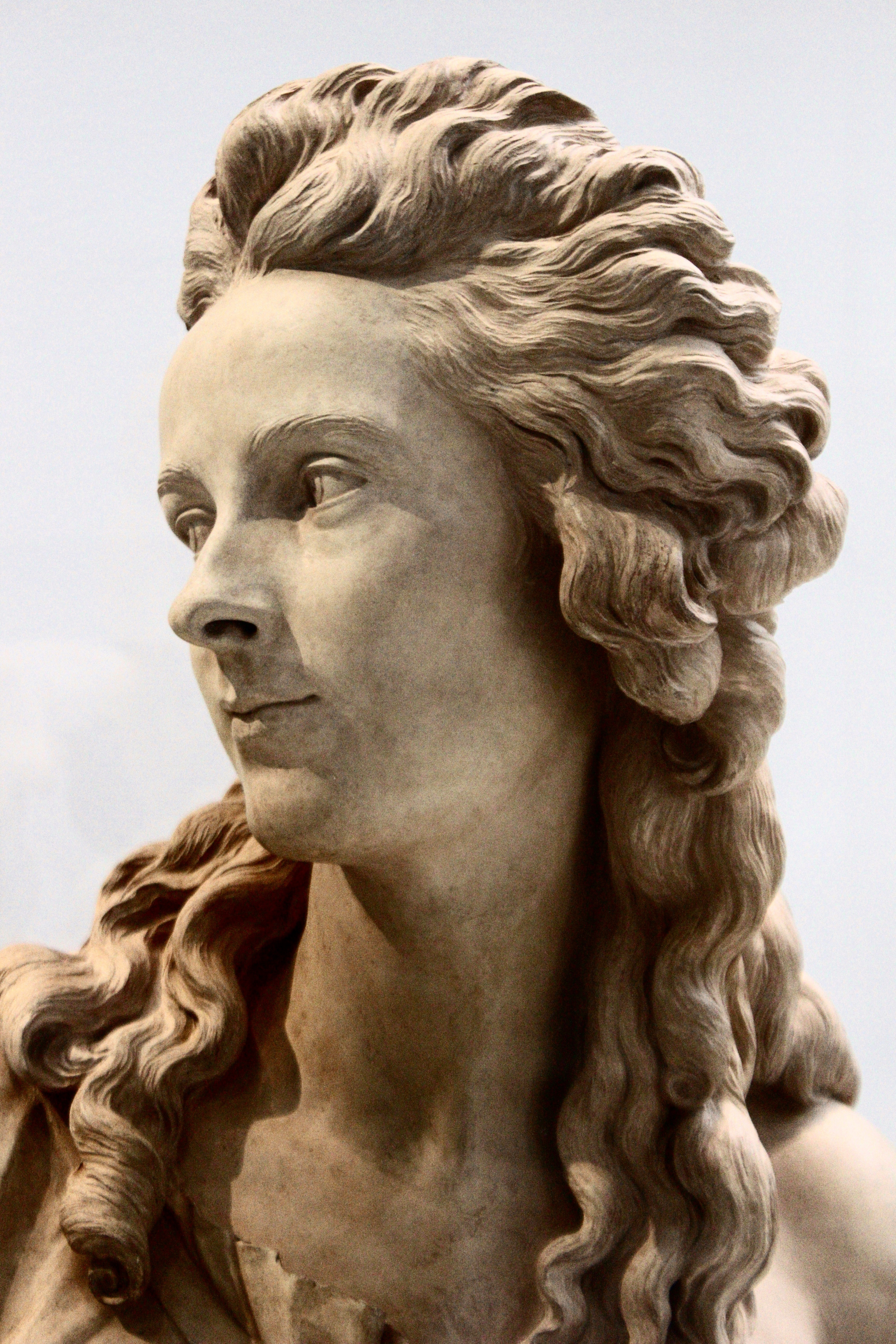
Élisabeth Vigée-Lebrun by Augustin Pajou

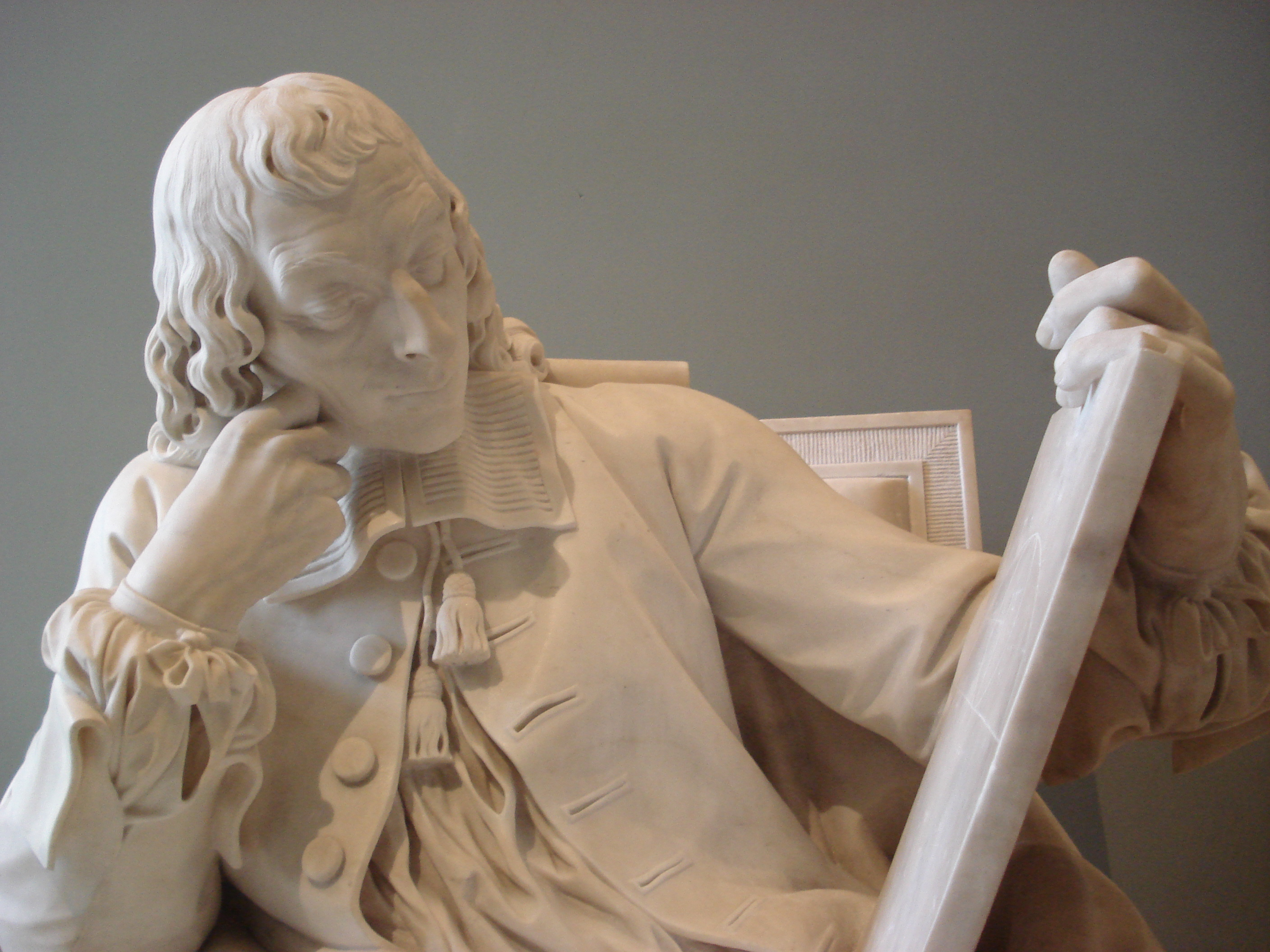
Blaise Pascal (detail) by Augustin Pajou (1785)

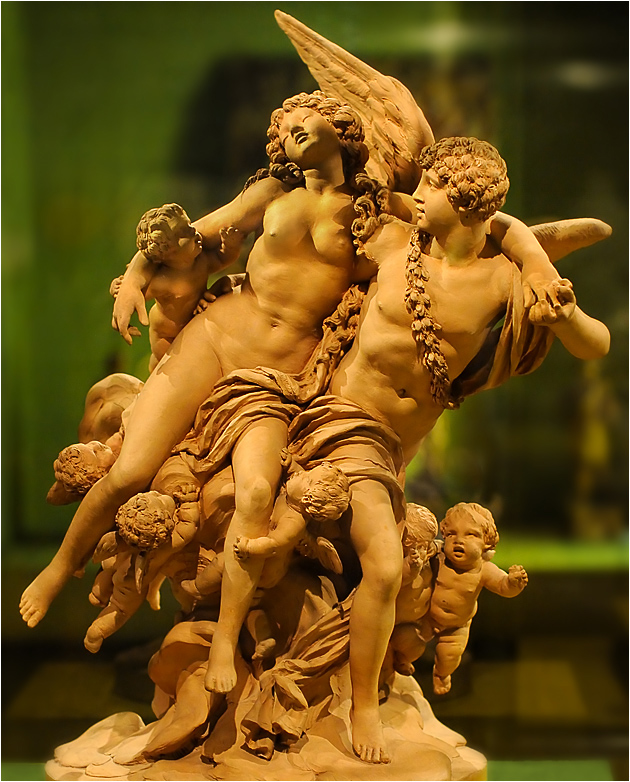
Cupid and Psyche by Claude Michel (Clodion) (c. 1775)

== The Nineteenth Century ==
The first major figures of French sculpture in the 19th century were Antoine-Louis Barye (1795–1875) and François Rude (1784–1855), each of whom broke away from the classical models and ideals of the 18th century. Barye was most famous as a portrayer of animals, which he depicted with great realism, often combining in groups with people. His works include sculptural decoration of the July Column in the Place de la Bastille, and four groups on the facade of the Pavillon Denon of the Louvre (1854). Rude's subjects were not nobles but ordinary people, portrayed realistically, not in classical postures. This appeared in is his first important sculpture, of a young Neapolitan fisher-boy (1833), and in his most famous work, The Departure of the Volunteers, (1836), a bas-relief on the base of the new Arc de Triomphe, which became a classic example of the movement of romanticism. His portrait busts of leading personalities, such as Jacques-Louis David, showed them not idealized, but showing the summit of emotion.

The sculptor Honoré Daumier (1808–1879) occupied a unique place in 19th century sculpture, with a series of sculptures of portraits of members of the French Parliament that mercilessly caricatured and satirized them.

Jean-Baptiste Carpeaux (1827–1865) was the most eminent French sculptor during the reign of Napoleon III, capturing the spirit of the Second Empire. He studied first with Rude, where he learned precision and naturalism, then, at Rude's suggestion, in the more traditional Academy, where he was a student of Barye, he learned the Renaissance style of Michelangelo and won the Prix de Rome. His statue Ugolin, the thinker caused a scandal, which made him famous. With his friend architect Charles Garnier, he made his most famous work of sculptural decoration of the facade of the Opera Garnier in Paris, The Genius of the Dance, full of passion and energy, which shocked more conservative Parisians. He also made a celebrated work of Flore for the facade of the Louvre, and the statuary for the Fontaine de l'Observatoire, to the south of the Luxembourg Gardens.

Jules Dalou (1838–1902) a pupil of Carpeaux, followed him as an important monumental sculptor, Triumph of the Republic, (1889) marking the centenary of the French Revolution, in the Place de la Nation.

Edgar Degas used sculpture as a tool for his painting. When he died some one hundred fifty terra cotta and wax sculptures of dancers, women at their dressing table, and other subjects were found in his studio. He apparently used these sculptures and models, to study the effects of light. His sculptures, often delicately colored and with fabric skirts, captured grace, movement, and character of the dancers as finely as his paintings.

The most famous French sculptor of the 19th century, Auguste Rodin (1840–1917), wished to be a pupil of Carpeaux, but did not succeed, though he later borrowed one of Carpeaux's subjects, Ugolin, the Thinker. He did become a student of Barye, who was his drawing instructor. His extraordinary abilities of careful observation combined with an ability use light, and to express emotions, very quickly made him famous, though it also quickly brought him criticism. all his major public works were attacked. His most famous works included The Thinker, The Burghers of Calais, and Balzac. By the time of the 1900 Paris Exposition, he had so many commands that he served principally as a modeler, employing a large studio of assistants to actually make the statues. He conceived his famous statue, The Thinker, in 1881–1882, and displayed a full-size model in 1904 at the Salon des Beaux-Arts. Twenty-eight castings of the statue were eventually made. Toward the end of his life, he made an even more influential work, a sculptural portrait of Honoré de Balzac. Rodin was selected for the commission by the writer Emile Zola Rodin experimented with many different versions costumes and poses, beginning in 1891, and finally decided to portray not the physical appearance, but the sprit and thoughts of Balzac, through an exaggeration of his features. The work caused a scandal when it was presented in 1898, and it was rejected by the Salon of the National Society of Fine Arts. A subscription covered the cost of the model, which was put up on Avenue Friedland in 1902. Rodin never saw the final bronze version, which was placed at the intersection of Avenues Raspail and Montparnasse in 1939.

The students of Rodin modified and created new variations, many expressing the sense of movement, speed and change felt at the end of the century. These sculptors included Rodin's student and lover Camille Claudel (1864–1943).

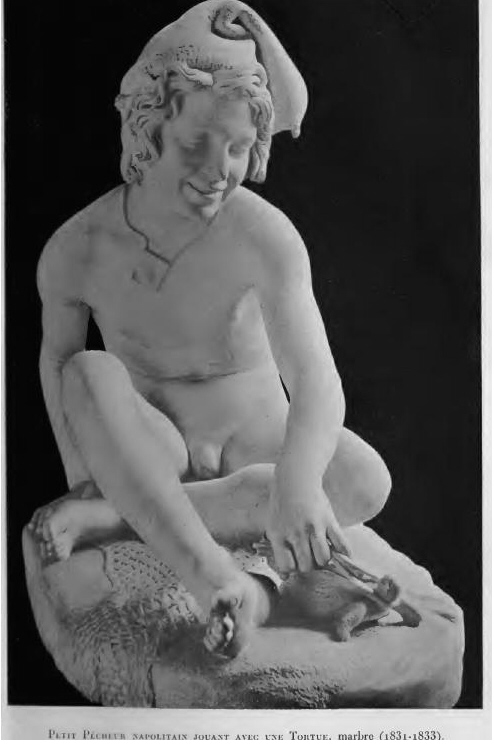
Neapolitan fisher-boy by François Rude, (1833)

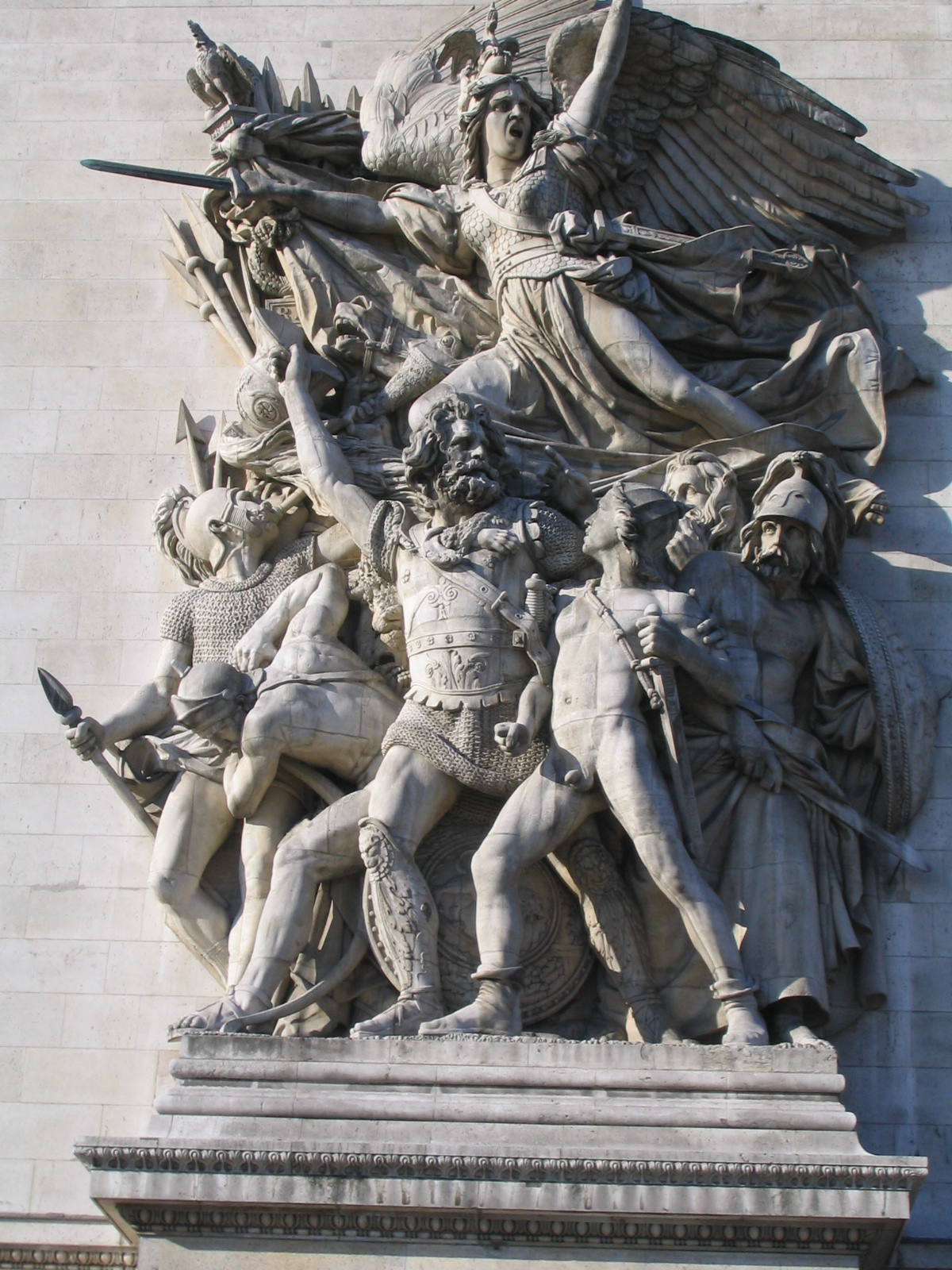
The Marseillaise by François Rude, (1836), on base of the Arc de Triomphe

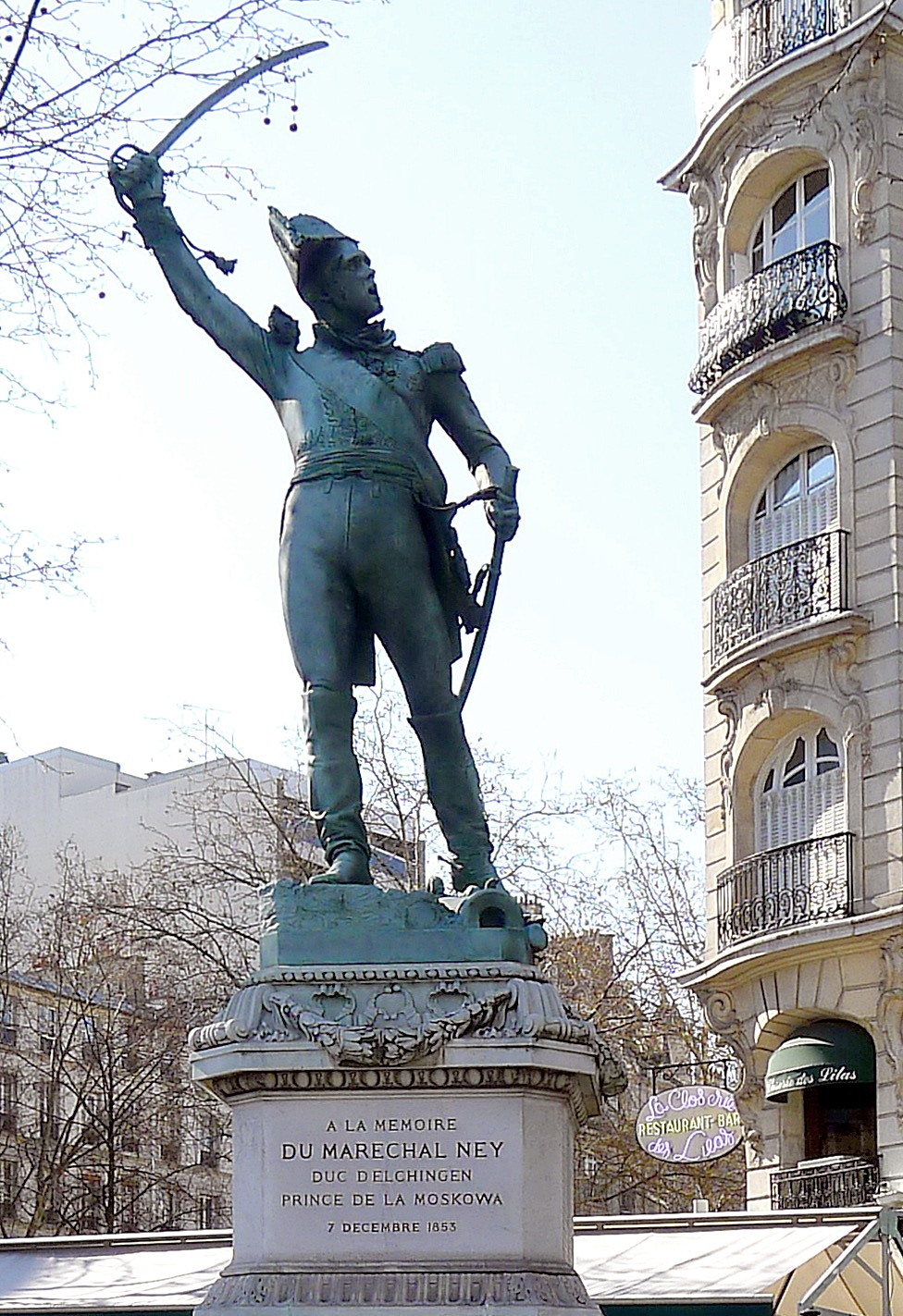
Marechal Ney, 6th arrondissement, Paris, by François Rude, (1836)

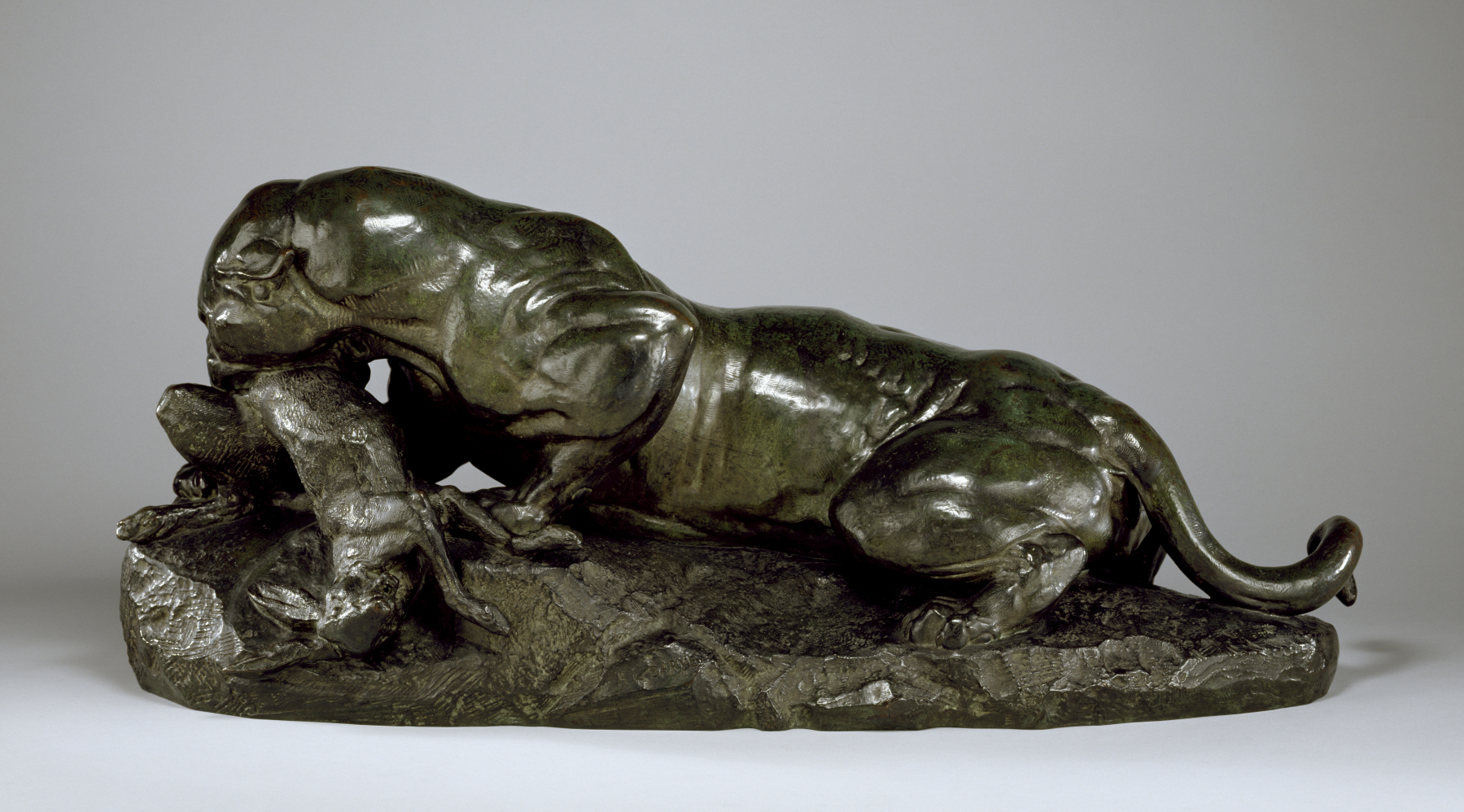
Jaguar devouring a hare, by Antoine Louis Barye (1850), Walters Gallery

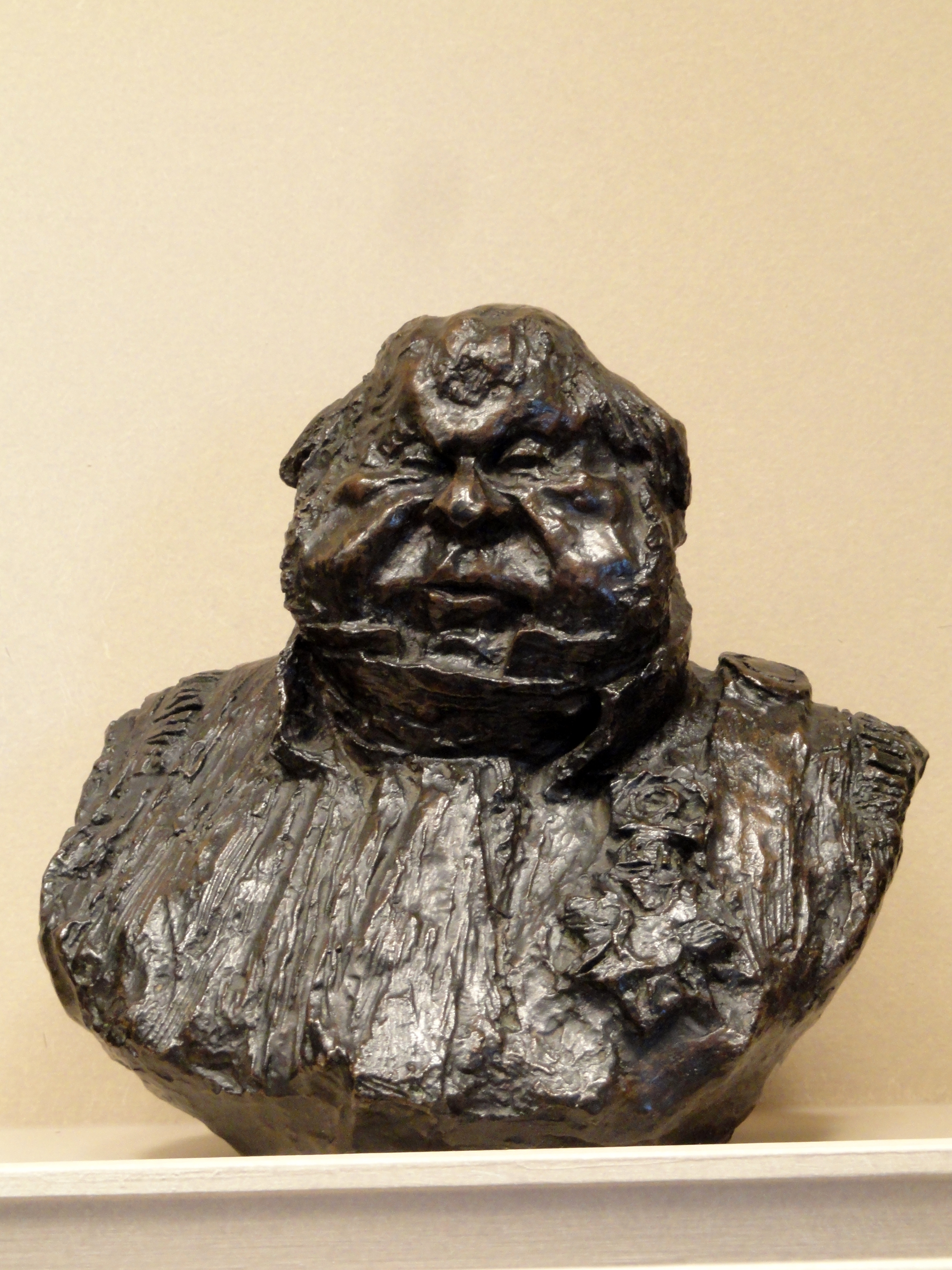
Bust of Hippolyte-Abraham Dubois by Honoré Daumier. National Gallery of Art, Washington

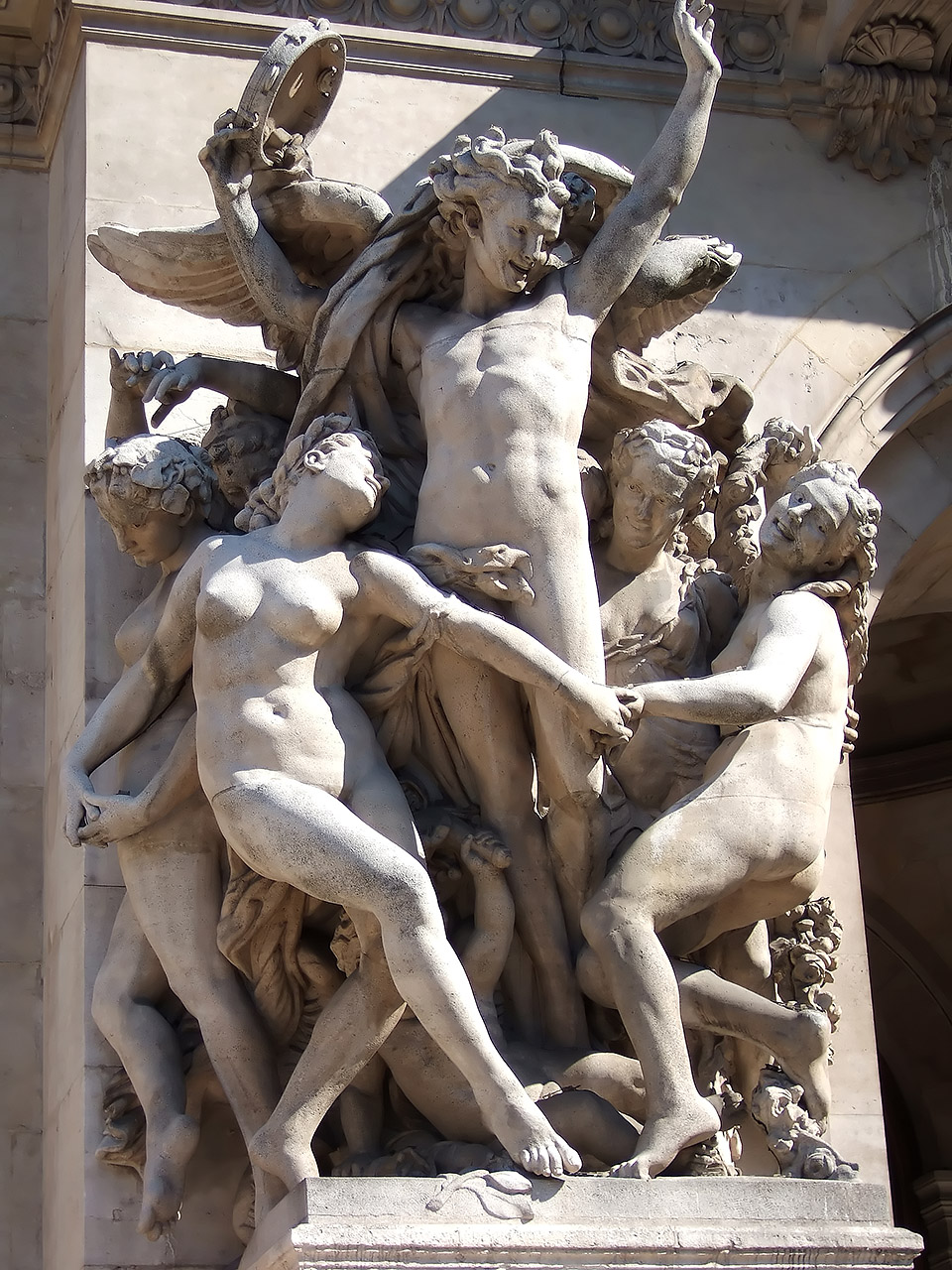
"The Dance" by Jean-Baptiste Carpeaux, for the facade of the Opera Garnier

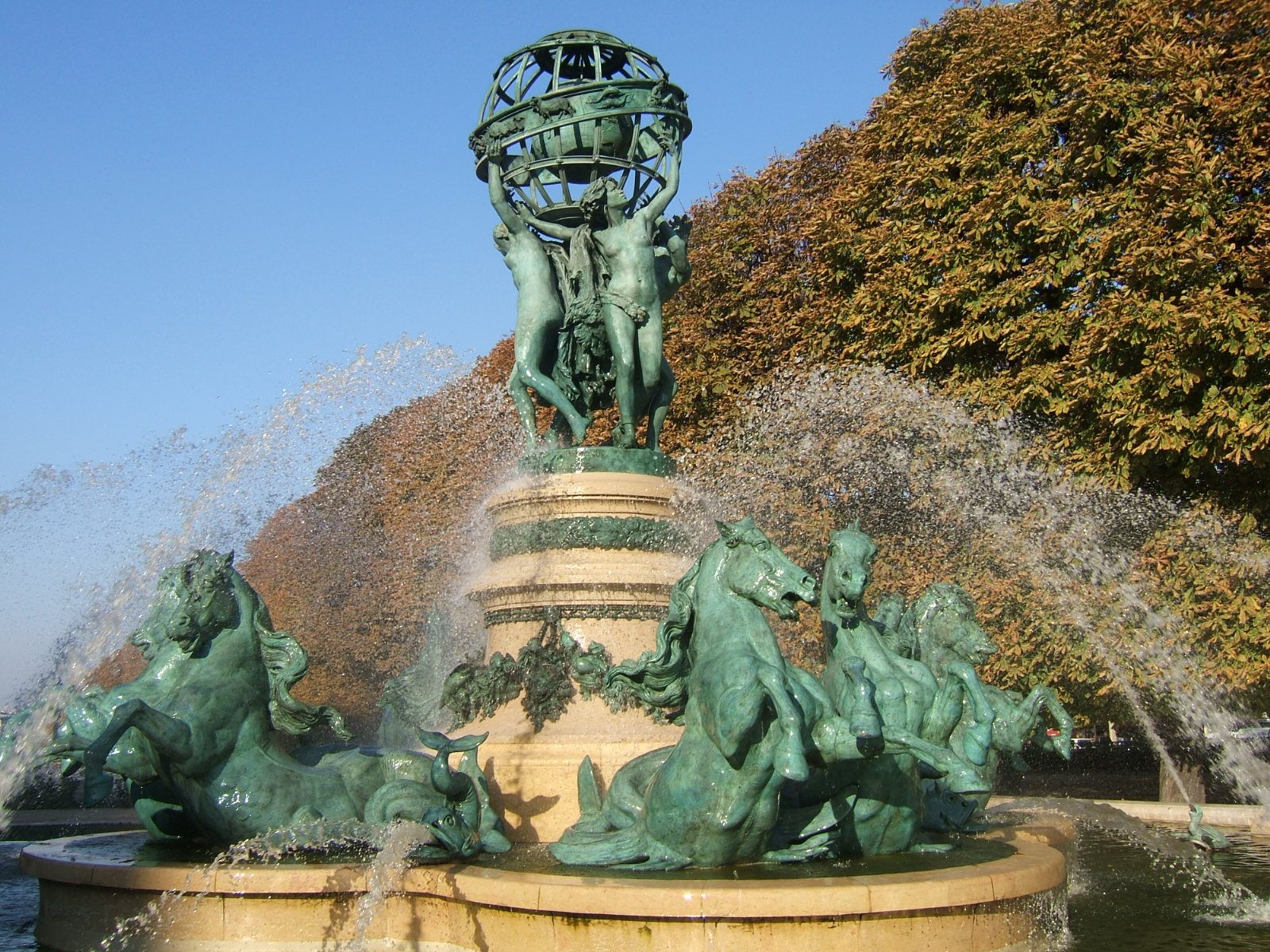
The Seasons turning the celestial Sphere, by Jean-Baptiste Carpeaux for the Fontaine de l'Observatoire

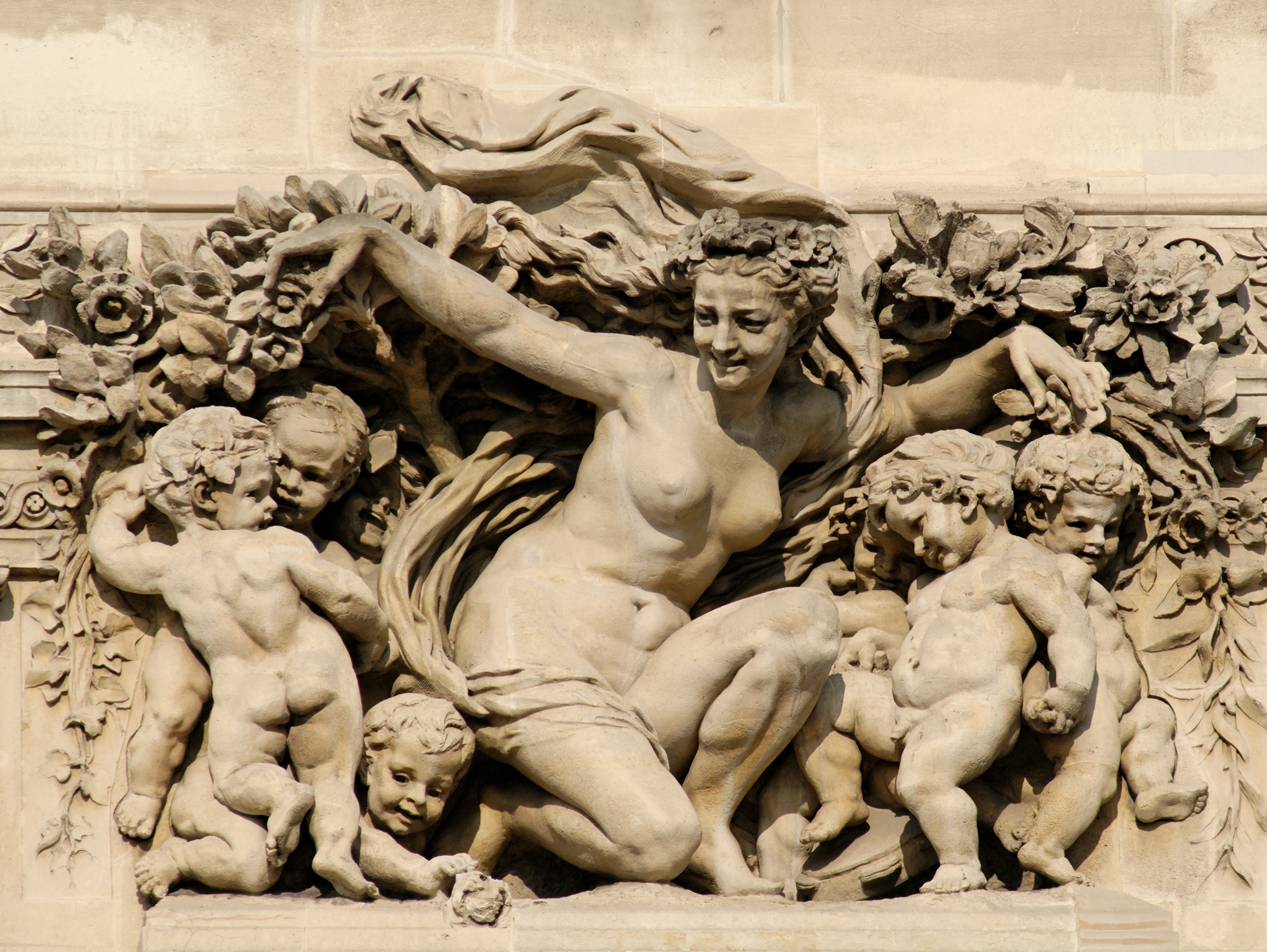
Flora and high-reliefs for the southern facade of the Pavillon de Flore, Jean-Baptiste Carpeaux, Palais du Louvre (1865)

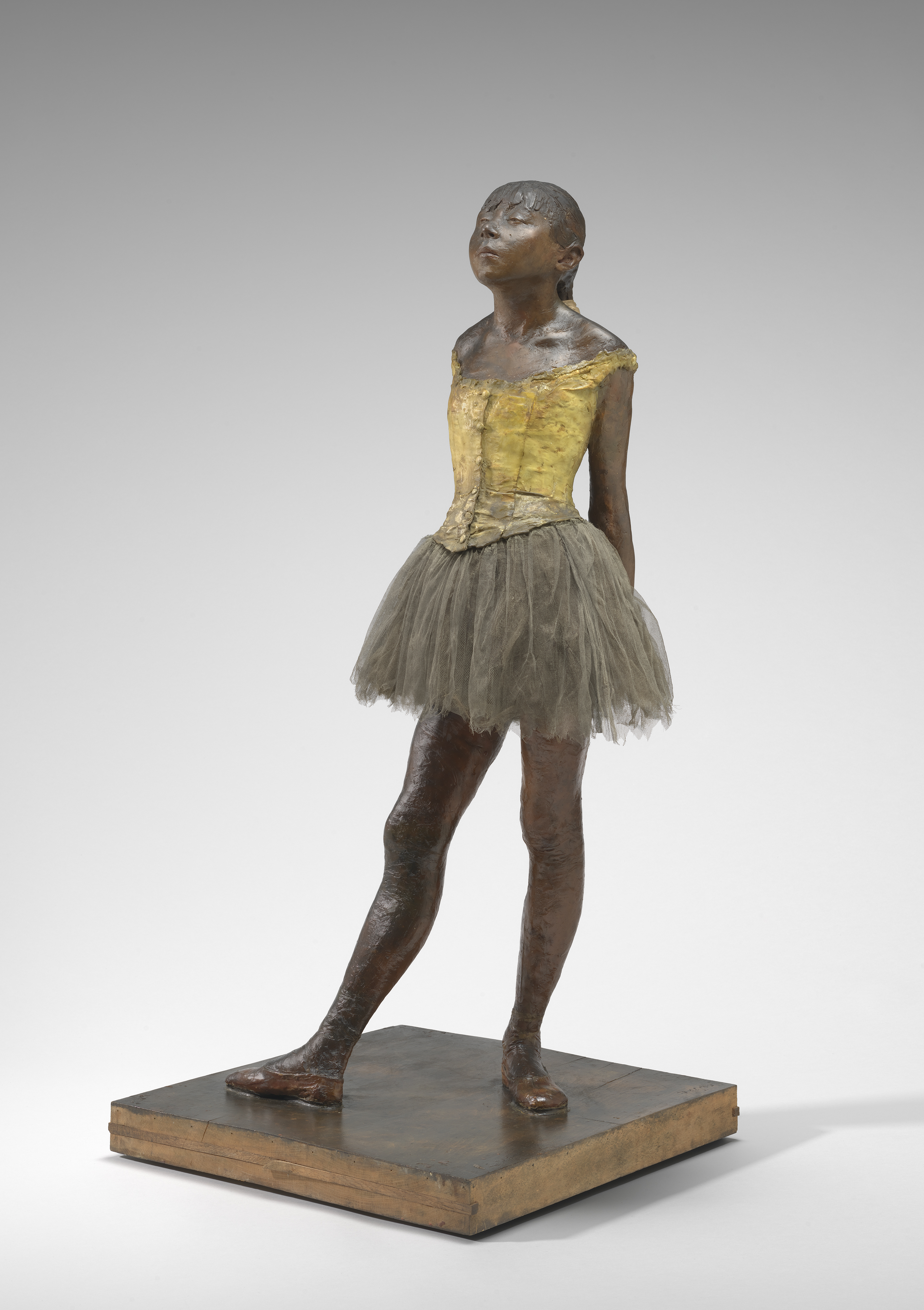
Little Dancer Aged Fourteen, by Edgar Degas (1878–81), National Gallery of Art

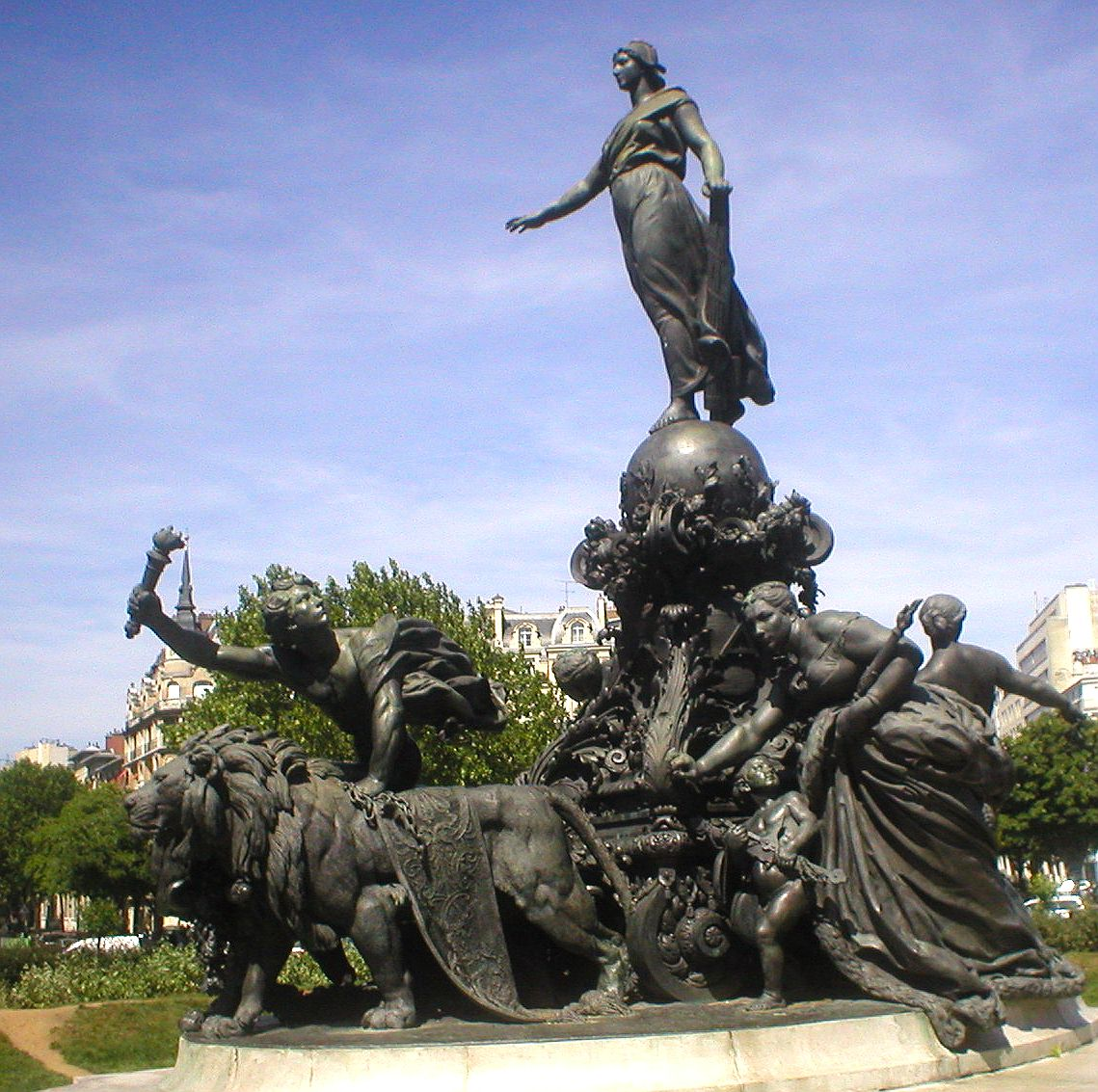
Triumph the Republic, in the Place de la Nation, by Jules Dalou (1889)

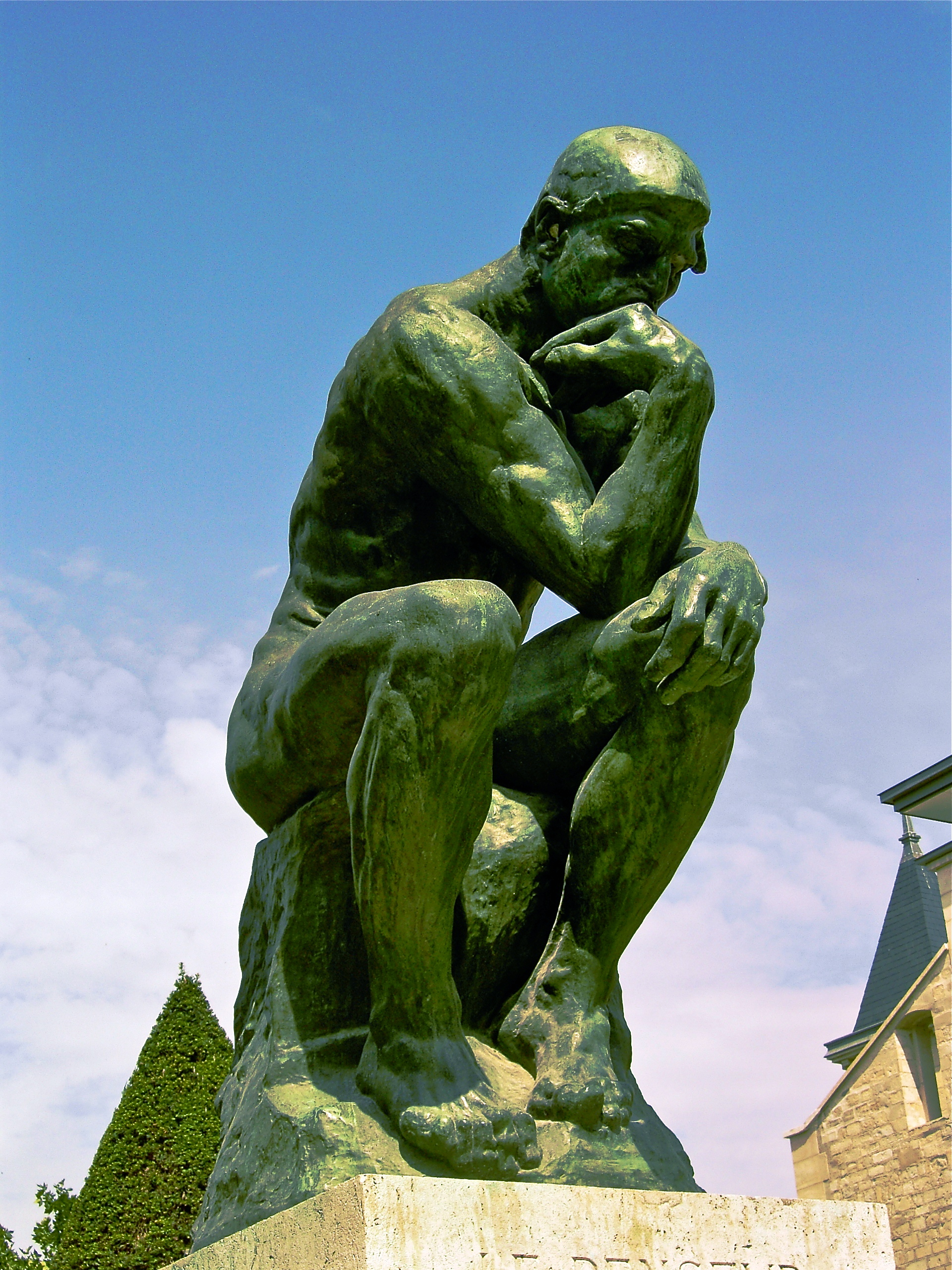
The Thinker by Auguste Rodin (1879-1889)

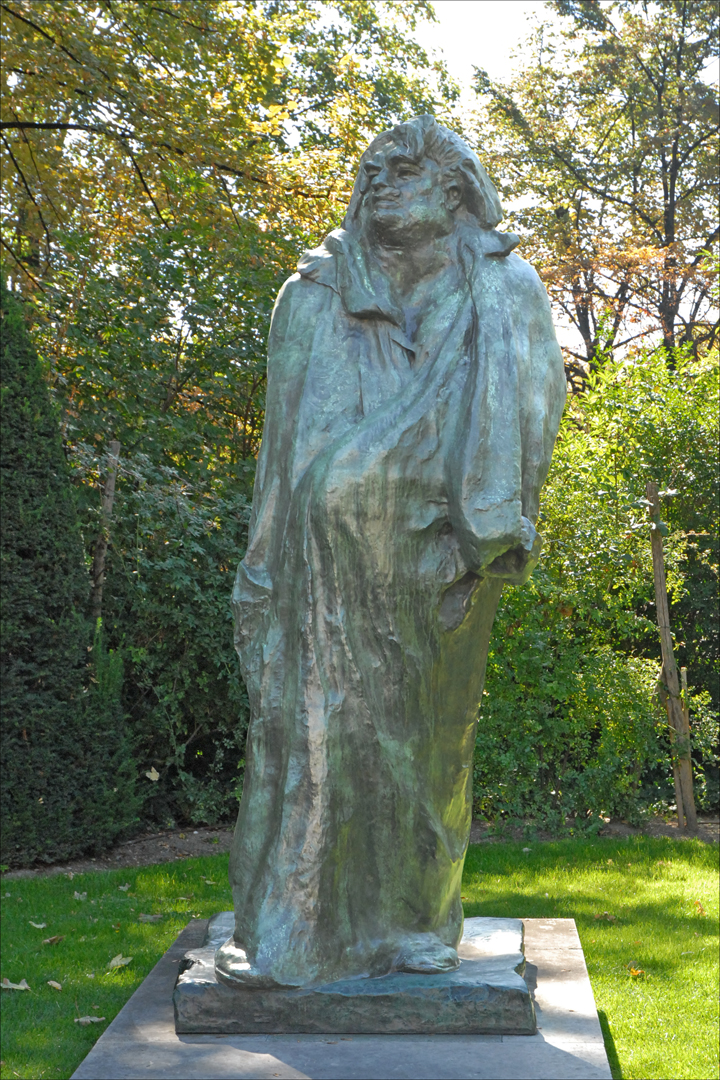
Monument to Balzac (1898), Musée Rodin, Paris

== Twentieth Century – The end of rules ==
The years from 1900 until 1914 were a period of extraordinary experimentation in sculpture, breaking all previous rules and traditions. Artists from around the world and from the French provinces were drawn to Paris. Antoine Bourdelle (1861–1929) was a student of Rodin, whose work spanned the two centuries and illustrated the transition to the new styles. His stylized bas-relief sculptures in the Theatre des Champs Elysées (1910–12) blended with the new Art Deco architectural style. Important sculptors in the early century included Aristide Maillol (1861–1944), who began as a painter and switched to sculpture, He particularly portrayed, in natural and sensual form, the female nude. Germaine Richier (1902–1959), a student of Bourdelle, made strange hybrids of human and animal forms. Her work expressed nervousness and tension.

François Pompon, who had worked in the studio of Rodin, inherited the role of animal sculptor that Bayre had occupied, though unlike Bayrle he had no interest in realism. He simplified and purified the forms, seeking just the essence of the animal.

Many of the major modernist painters of the early 20th century also experimented with sculpture; these included Henri Matisse, André Derain, Fernand Léger, Georges Braque, and others. They had no formal training or experience as sculptors, and followed none of the traditional rules, with greater or lesser success.

The use of new and unusual materials was a common feature in much 20th century sculpture. Henri-Georges Adam made very large abstract works of concrete, such as his 22-meter long Signal at the Museum of Fine Arts in Le Havre.

The most celebrated and controversial work in the 20th century was probably Fountain a work entered into the 1917 Exhibition of Independent Artists in New York by French artist Marcel Duchamp. It was an ordinary urinal purchased by DuChamp, and proposed by DuChamp as a work of art. It was reluctantly accepted by the show organizers, since any sculptor who paid the fee could show his work, but it was never put on display, and created an enormous scandal in the art world, as Duchamp intended.

Gaston Lachaise also seemed to mock the traditions of classical sculpture, by his inflated nudes.

César Baldaccini (1921–1998) was a notable figure of French sculpture in the second half of the 20th century. César was at the forefront of the Nouveau Réalisme movement with his radical compressions (compacted automobiles, discarded metal, or rubbish), expansions (polyurethane foam sculptures), and fantastic representations of animals and insects.

Other prominent sculptors who worked in Paris in the 20th century included the Romanian Constantin Brâncuși, the Italian Amedeo Modigliani, Jean Arp, the Swiss Jean Tinguily, and Niki de Saint Phalle,

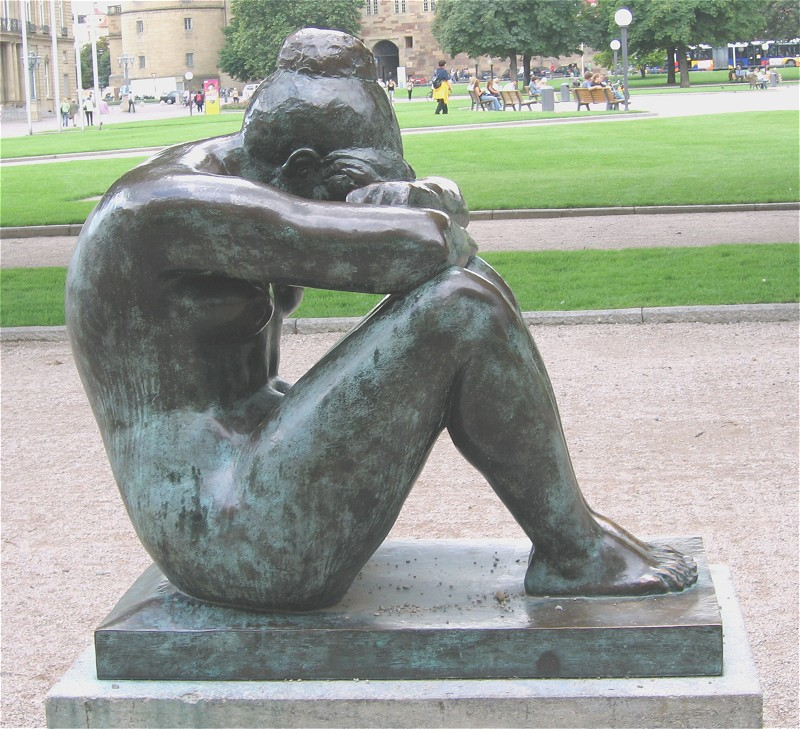
Night by Aristide Maillol (1902)

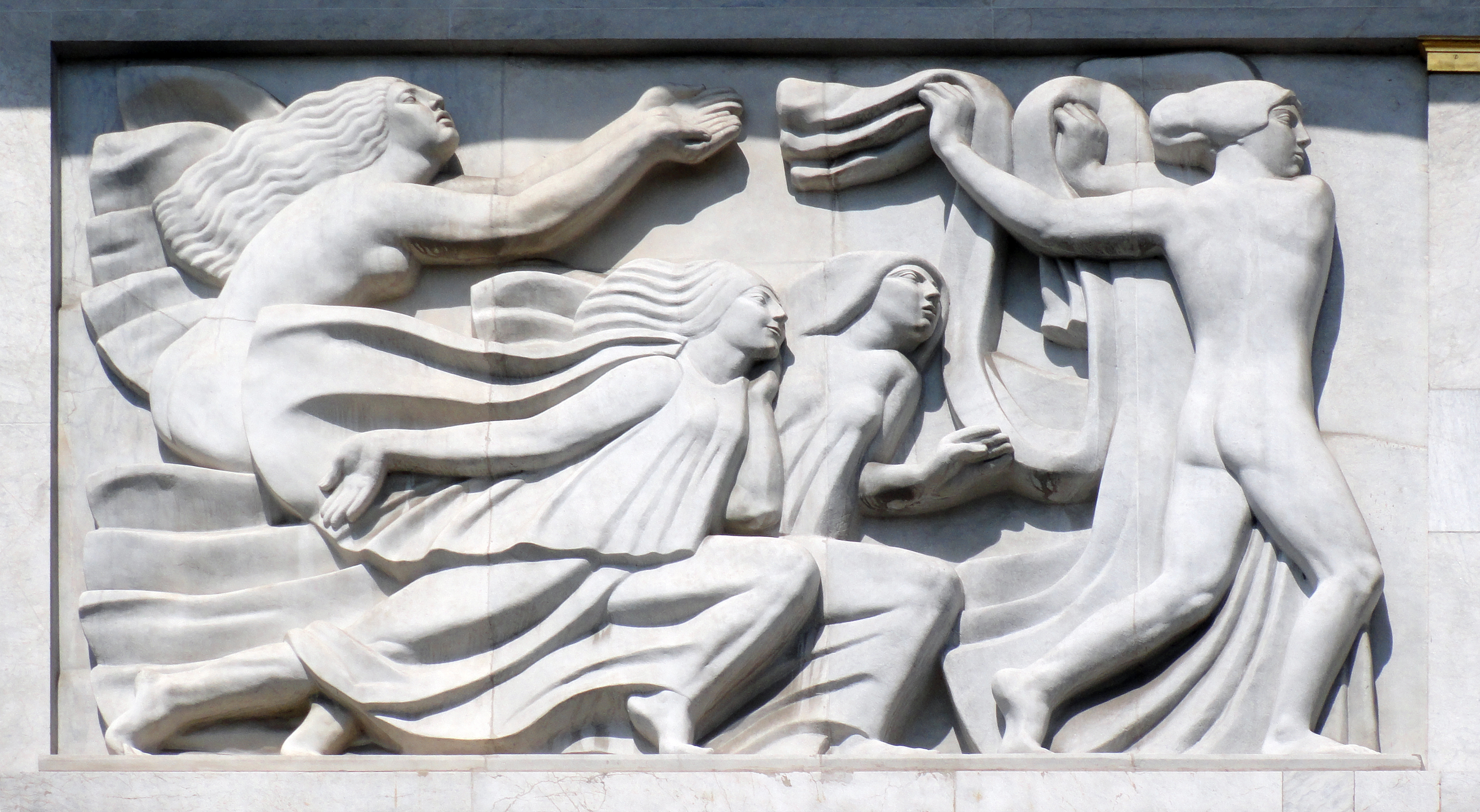
Apollo and the Muses, Antoine Bourdelle, Bas-relief at the Théâtre des Champs-Élysées, (1910-1912)

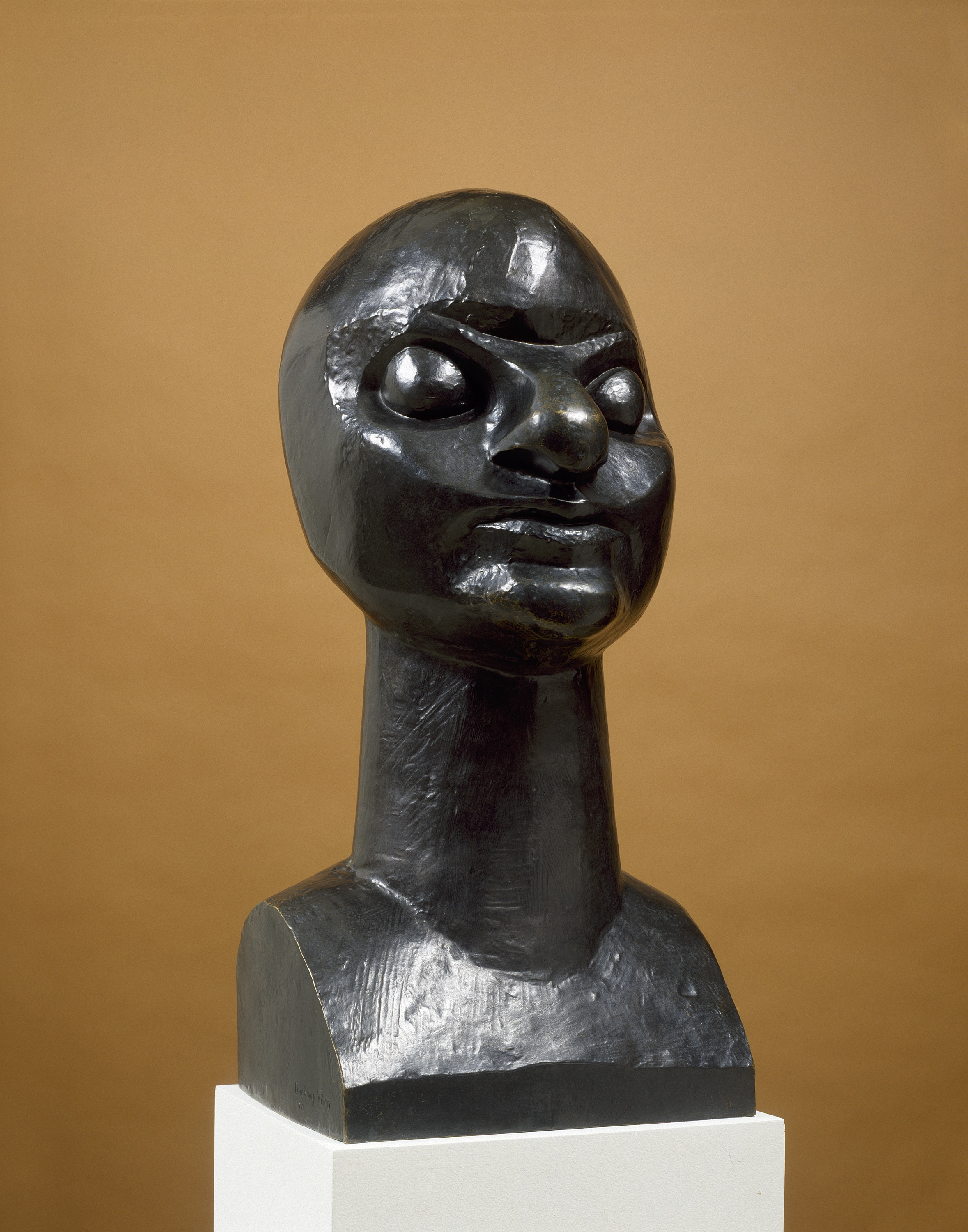
Maggy by Raymond Duchamp-Villon (1912)

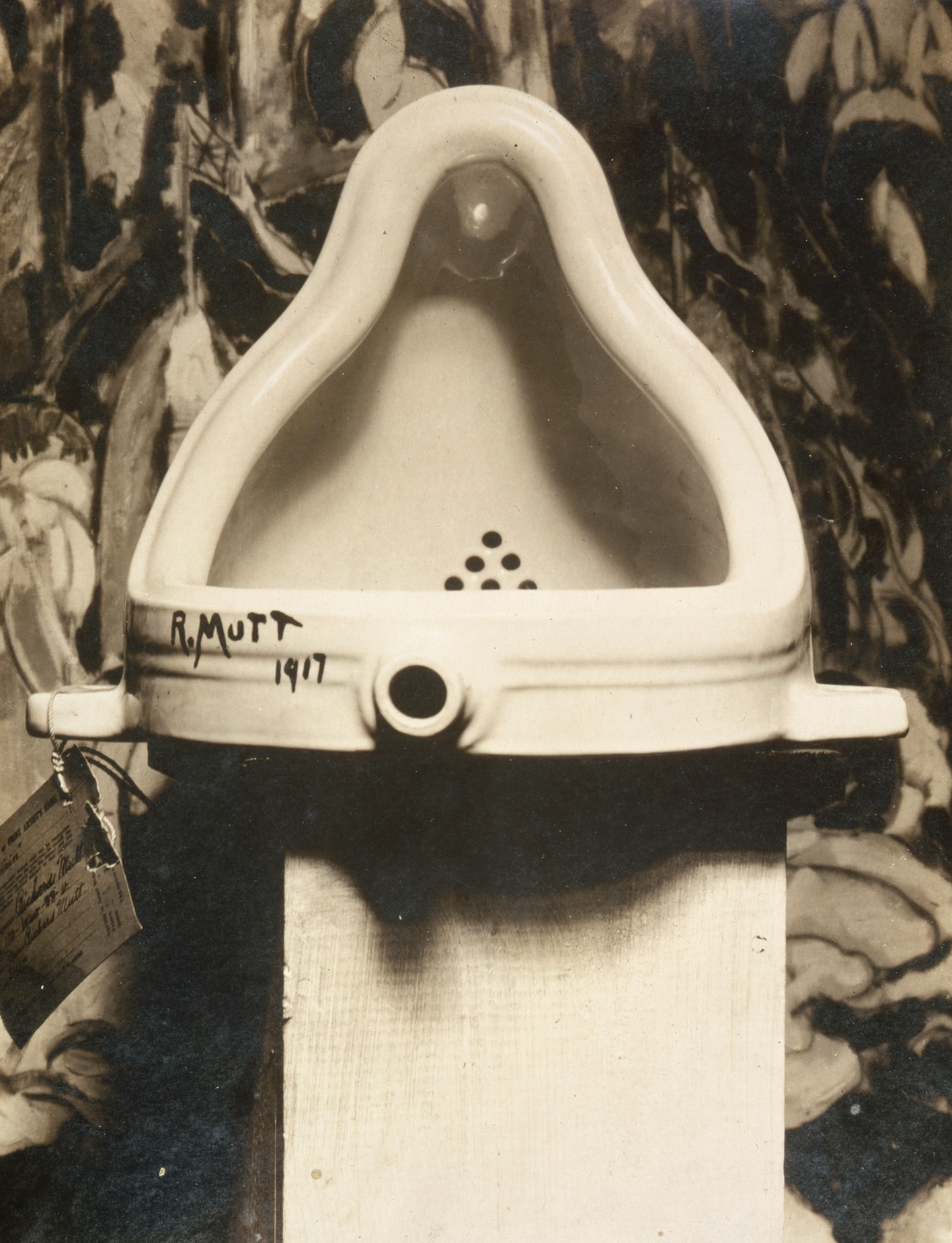
Fountain by Marcel Duchamp (1917)

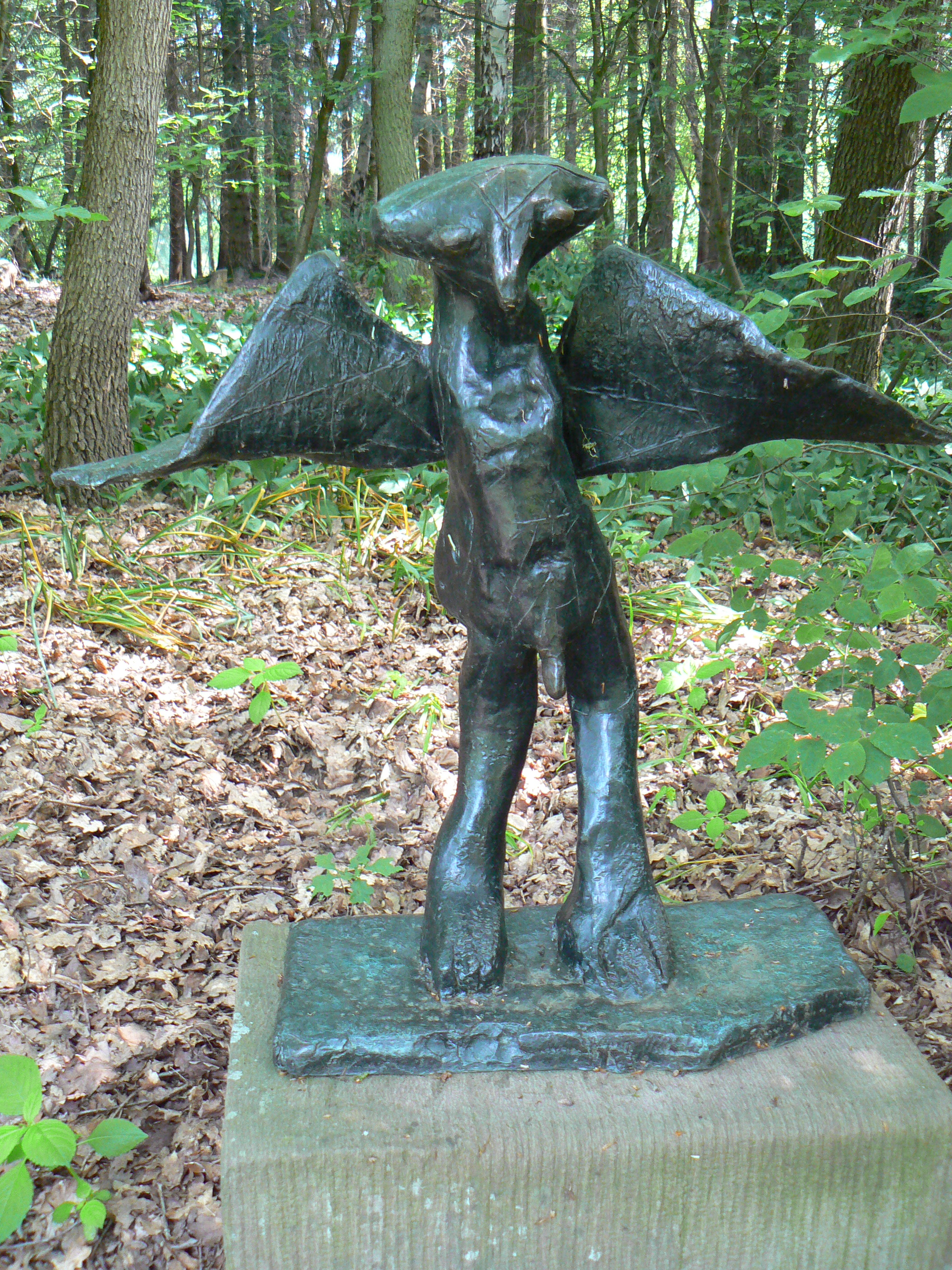
"The Great Man of the Night" by Germaine Richier (1954–55)

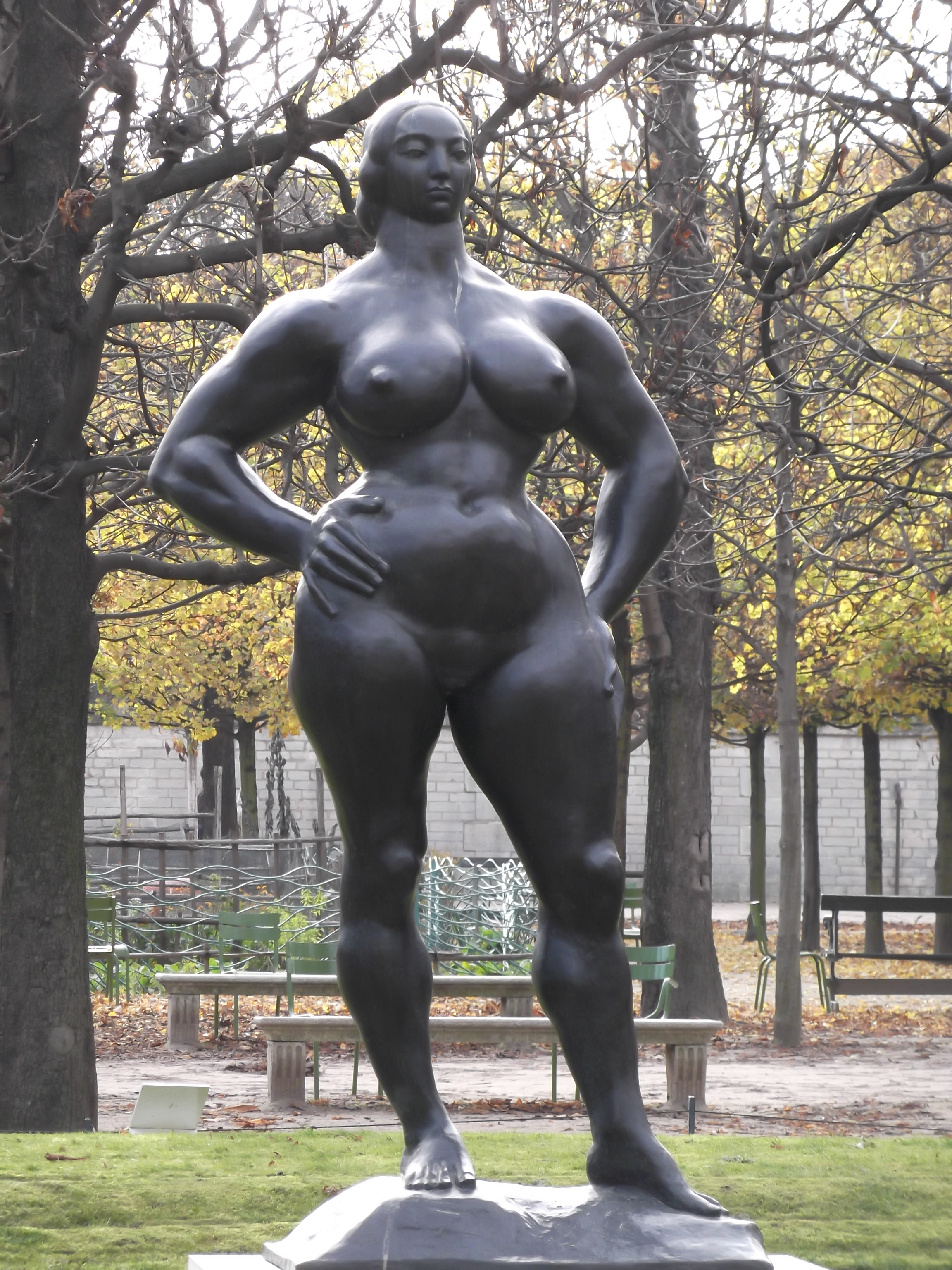
Standing Woman by Gaston Lachaise (1912–27) Tuileries Gardens

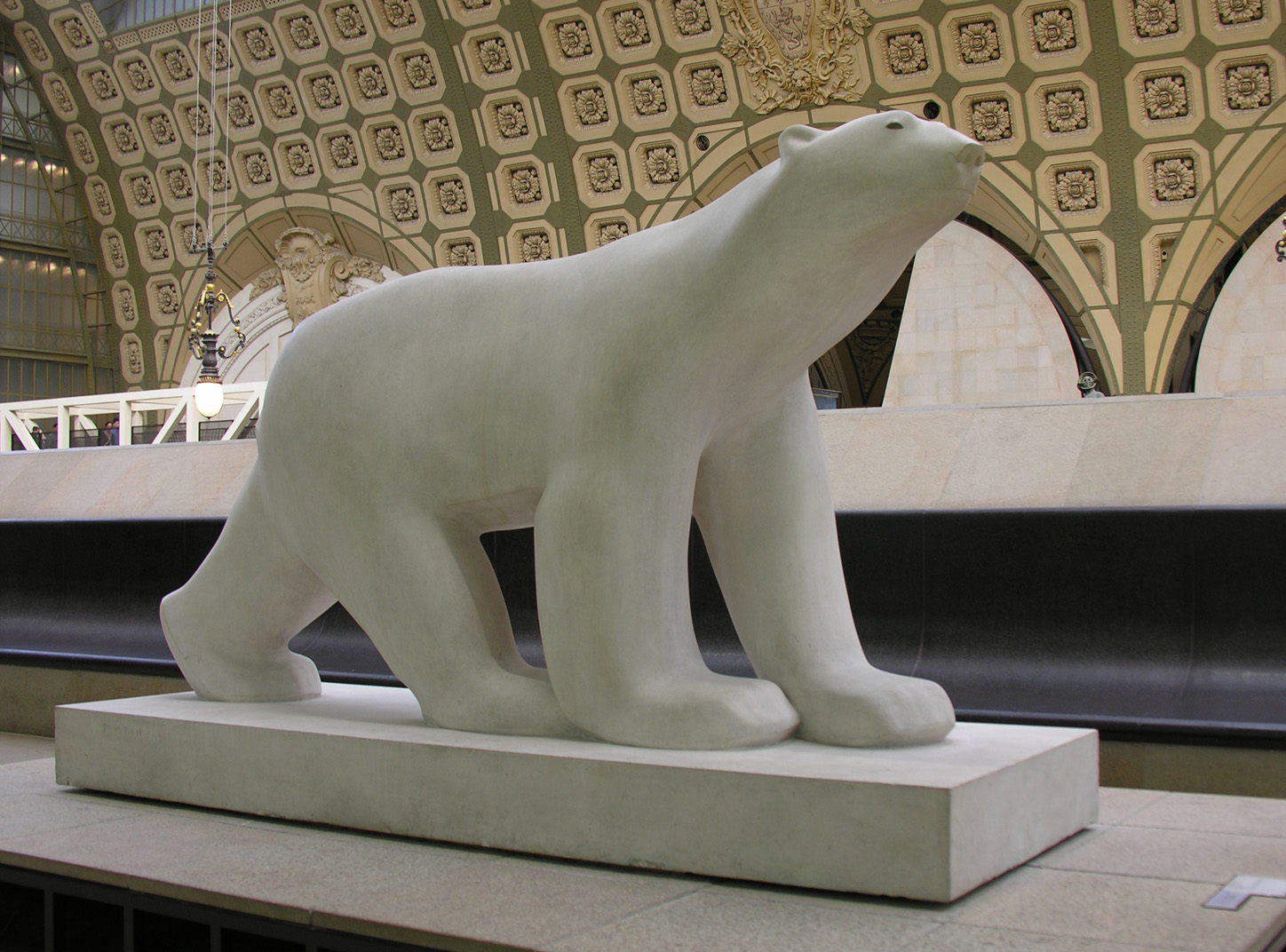
The White Bear by François Pompon, (1922) Musée d'Orsay

== Twenty-first century – variation ==
Starting in the late 20th century, but certainly contuining into the 21st, French cultural dominance in sculpturing, as well as in other art mediums, dwindled as the United States became far more culturally dominant in general. Postmodernism heavily dominates the scene in the modern day, although there are small independent movements working in Neoclassical sculpture and aspire to popularize modern working in classical styles. These include Atelier Missor, a foundry outside of Paris that has gone viral online on multiple occasions due to their usage of political messaging in their works.

== Bibliography ==
- Brocvielle, Vincent (2017). La Petit Larousse de l'Histoire de l'Art (in French). Larousse. ISBN 978-2-03-5936-39-4.
- Jeancolas, Claude (1992). Sculpture Française (in French). Paris: CELIV. ISBN 2-86535-162-9.
- Geese, Uwe, Section on Baroque sculpture in L'Art Baroque – Architecture – Sculpture – Peinture (French translation from German), H.F. Ulmann, Cologne, 2015. (ISBN 978-3-8480-0856-8)
- Duby, Georges and Daval, Jean-Luc, La Sculpture de l'Antiquité au XXe Siècle, (French translation from German), Taschen, (2013), (ISBN 978-3-8365-4483-2)
- Lagrange, Léon, Pierre Puget – Peintre – Sculpteur – Décorateur de Vaisseaux Didier et Cie, Paris (1868) (in French)
- Ducher, Robert (1998). Caractéristique des Styles (in French). Flammarion. ISBN 2-08-011539-1.
- Erland-Brandenburg, Alain (2005). L'art roman- Un défi européen (in French). Gallimard. ISBN 2-07-030068-4.
- Mignon, Olivier (2017). Architecture du Patrimoine Française – Abbayes, Églises, Cathédrales et Châteaux (in French). Éditions Ouest-France. ISBN 978-27373-7611-5.
- Toman, Rolf (2015). L'Art Roman – Architecture, Sculpture, Peinture (in French). H.F. Ullmann. ISBN 978-3-8331-1039-9.
