= Eustache de Saint Pierre (sculpture) =

Sculpture by Auguste Rodin

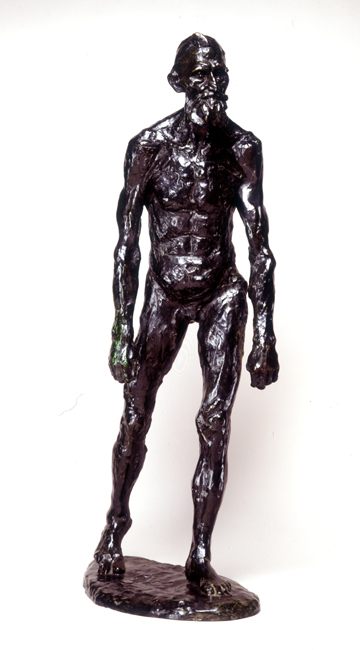
- Model for Eustache de Saint-Pierre
- Artist: Auguste Rodin
- Year: 1885-1886 (conceived)
- Location: Museo Soumaya, Mexico City

Eustache de Saint Pierre is a sculpture by Auguste Rodin, now in the Museo Soumaya in Mexico City. It was conceived between 1885 and 1886 as part of his The Burghers of Calais group. The other figures in the group (Jean de Fiennes, Pierre de Wiessant, Jacques de Wiessant, Jean d´Aire and Andrieu d'Andres) were also cast as individual figures.

== Design process ==
In Rodin's first maquette for the project, the figure of Eustache de Saint Pierre (the oldest of the burghers) was in a dominant position within the group, carrying the town's keys. The second maquette still showed the whole group and still had Saint Pierre in the front row, but his pose had been changed to showing his arms lowered and his body leaning forward. However, the committee supervising the commission rejected this pose, since it did not wish Saint Pierre to be shown as dejected.

Rodin also produced nude models of the individual figures - this work is one of them. He also made head and hand studies. For the figure of Saint Pierre, the head model was the painter Jean-Charles Cazin, who came from the Pas de Calais - 19th century pseudo-sciences such as physiognomy held that each region had a specific set of facial features. Although clothed in a robe and with a noose round his neck, the figure of Saint Pierre in the finished group is otherwise almost identical to the model.

== See also ==
- List of sculptures by Auguste Rodin
