= Andrieu d'Andres =

Andrieu d’Andres is a figure by the French artist Auguste Rodin. It is part of his group of the six figures The Burghers of Calais.

== Versions ==
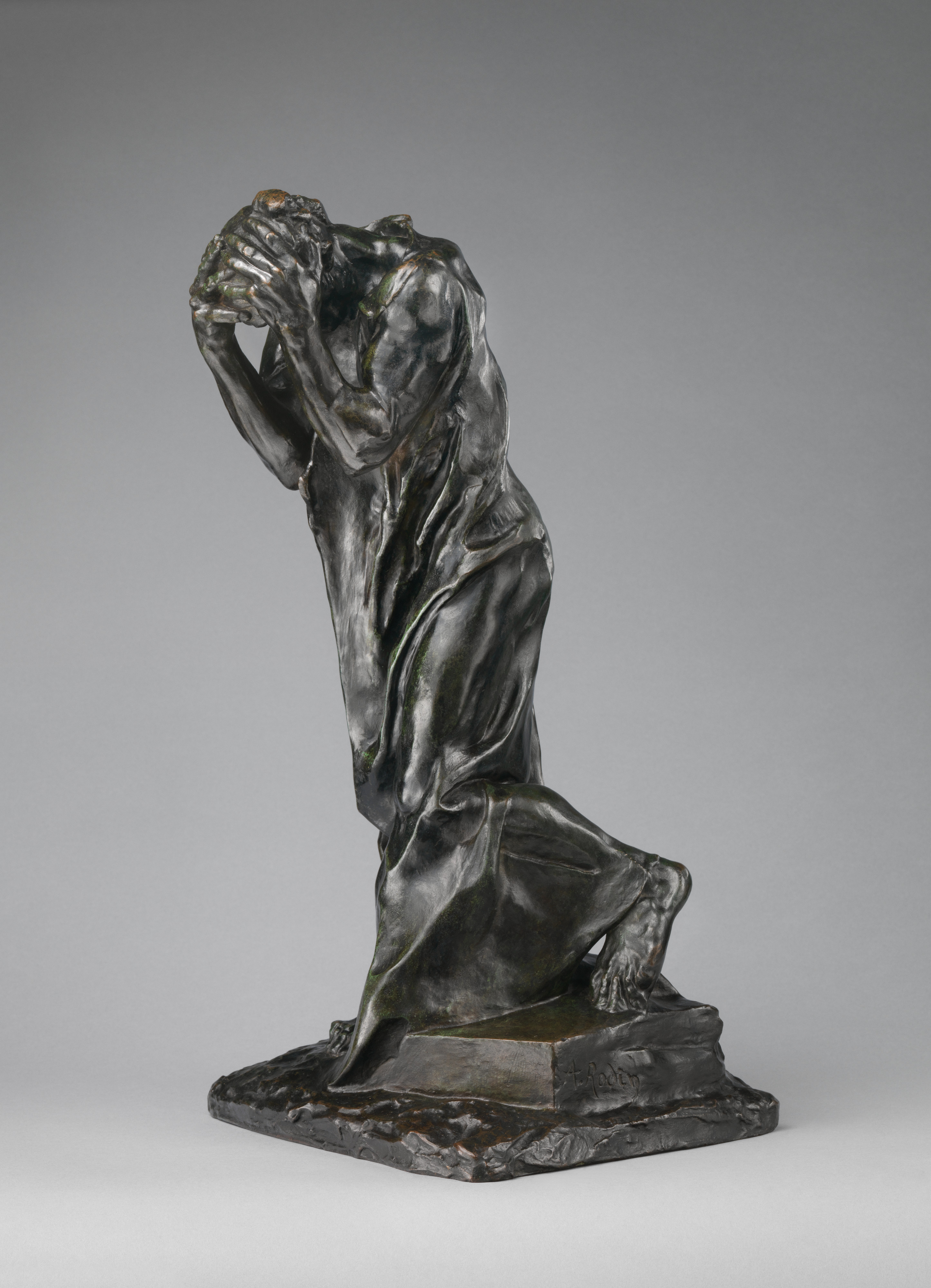
The Weeping Burgher

After the first group study, he formed individual studies of each figure. Like the other five figures, the first study of d'Andres is undressed. The finished figure is dressed in a simple robe. Rodin completed it 1885.

== Details of the figure ==
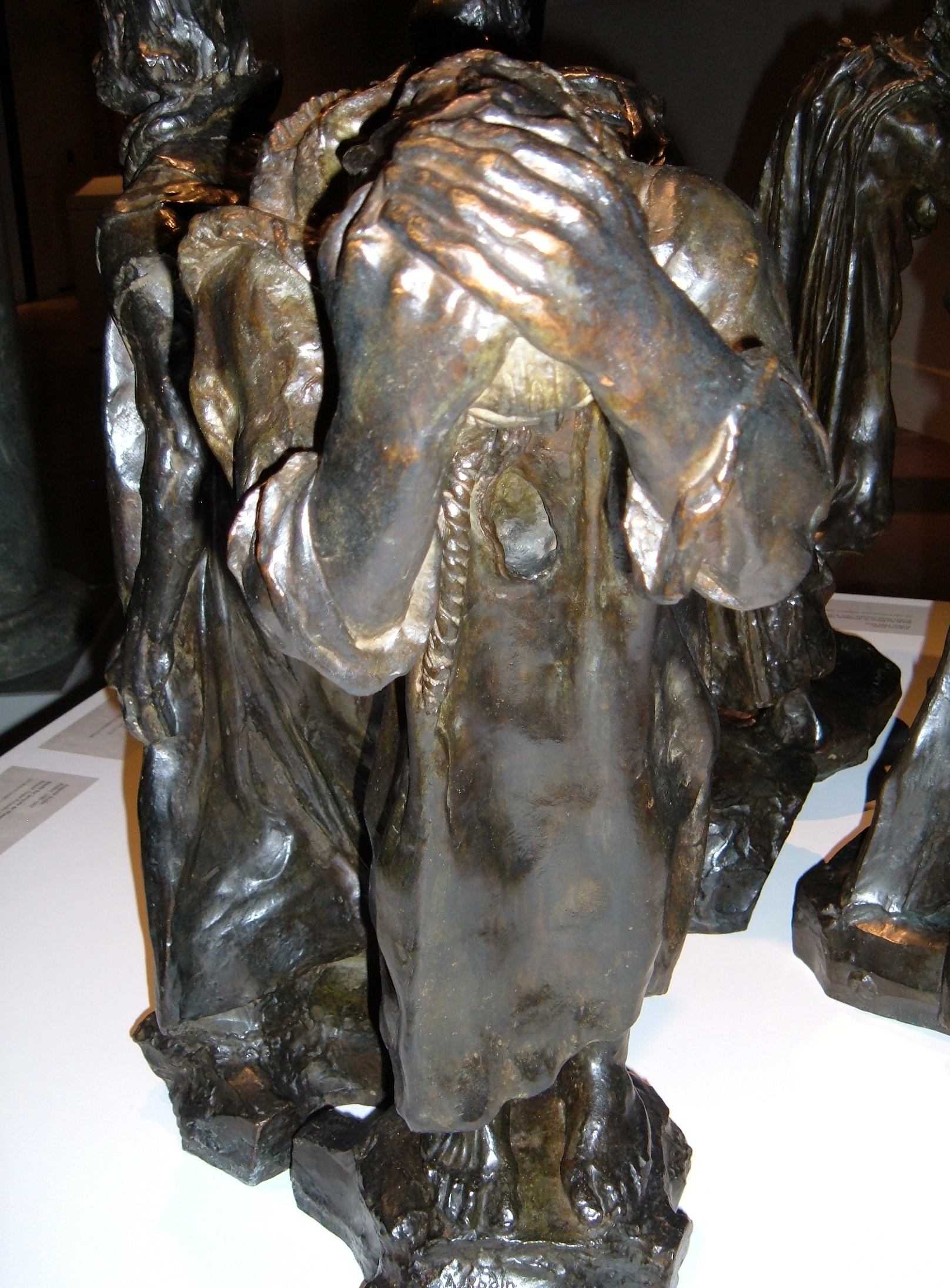
Hands

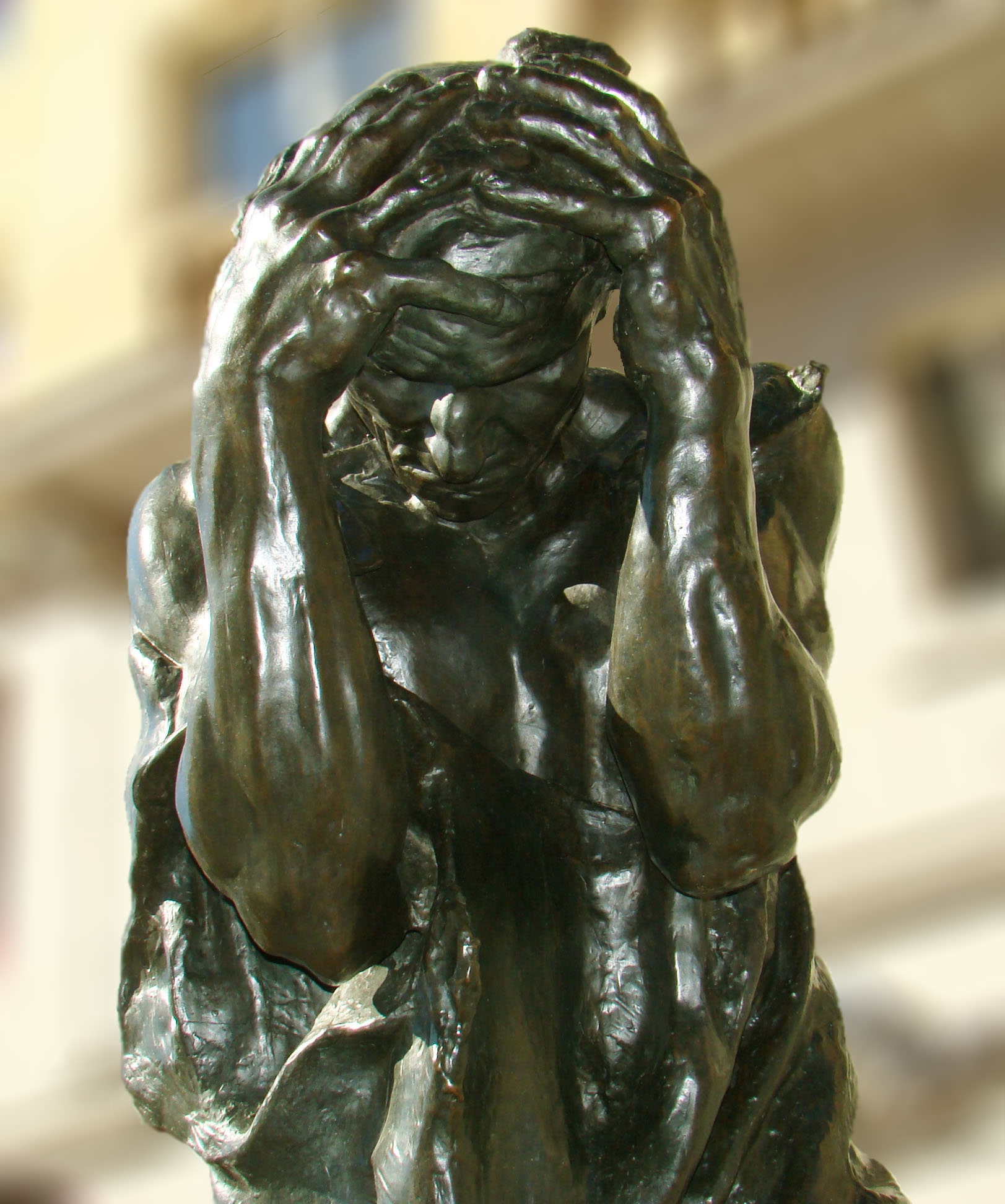
Front view

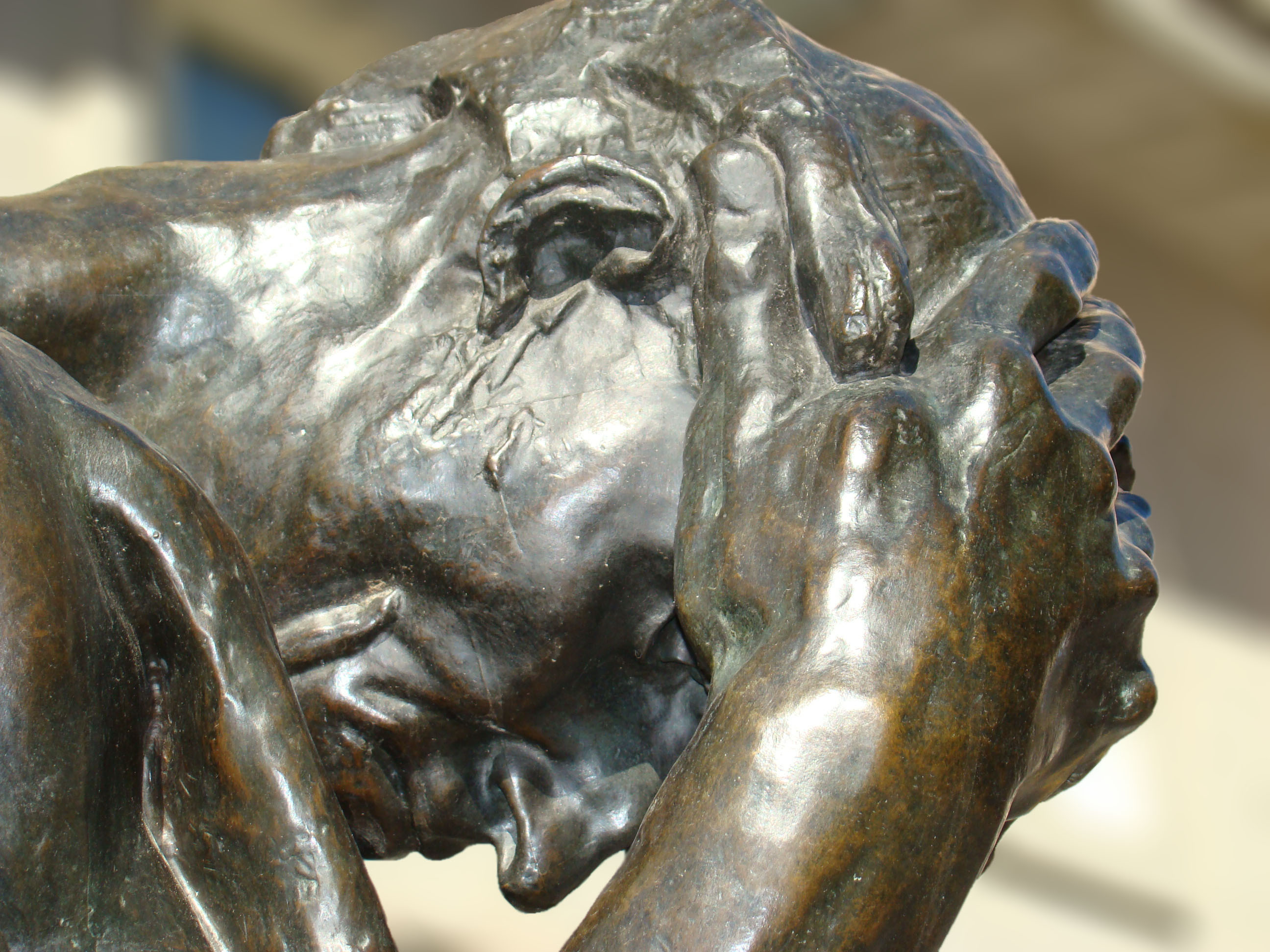
Head

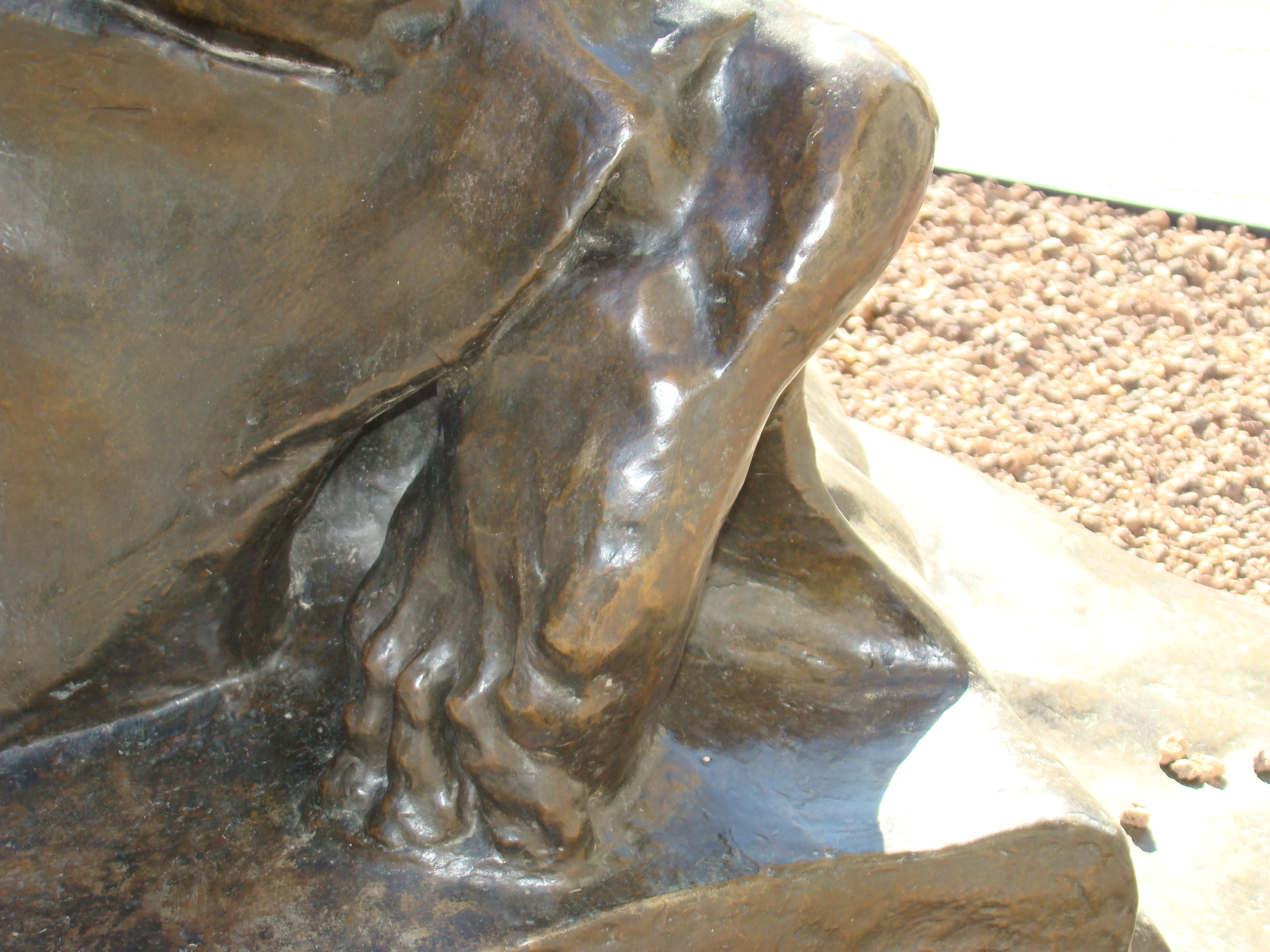
Foot

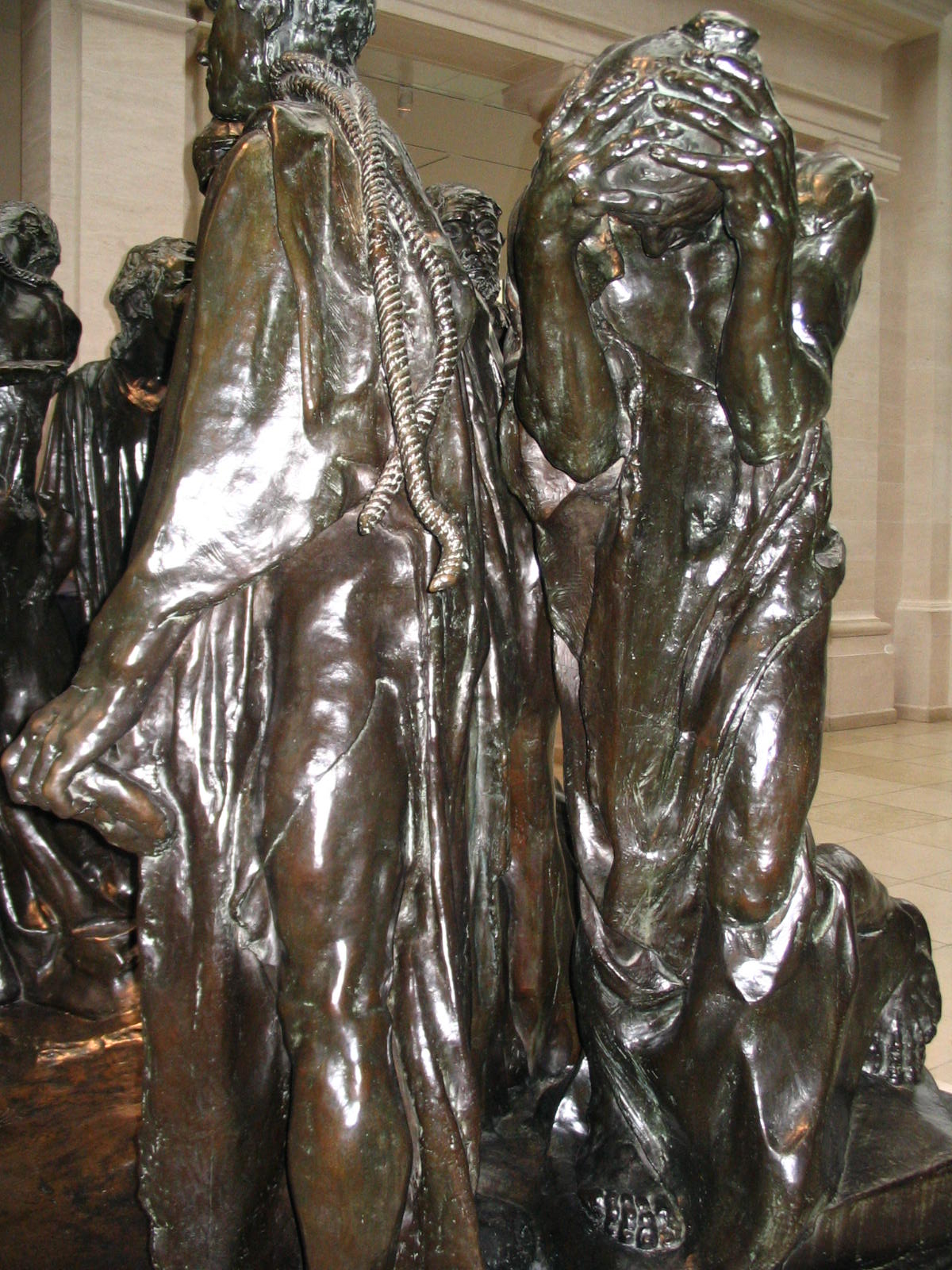
Andrieu d'Andres, pictured among the other Burghers of Calais at the Metropolitan Museum of Art

== Museums ==
Museums where the figure is exhibited, among others:

- Musée Rodin, Paris
- Ny Carlsberg Glyptotek, Copenhagen
- Israel Museum Jerusalem
- Rodin Gallery, Seoul
- Nationalmuseum für westliche Kunst, Tokyo
- Sculpture Garden of the National Gallery of Australien, Canberra
- Norton Simon Museum in Pasadena, California
- Hirshhorn Museum and Sculpture Garden, Washington, D.C.
- Rodin Museum, Philadelphia
- Metropolitan Museum of Art, New York
- Brooklyn Museum
- Kunstmuseum Basel
- Rupert Museum, Stellenbosch
- Art Gallery of Ontario, Toronto

== See also ==
- Pierre de Wissant
- Jacques de Wissant
- Eustache de Saint Pierre
- Jean de Fiennes
- Jean d'Aire
