= Pigault-Lebrun =

French writer

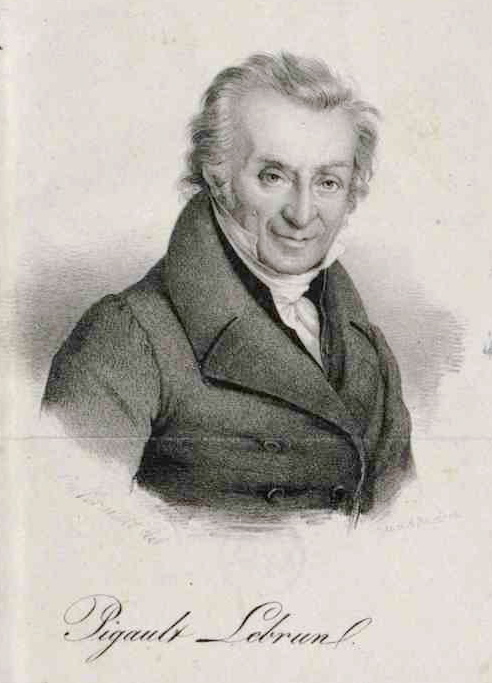
Pigault-Lebrun

Charles-Antoine-Guillaume Pigault de l'Espinoy, better known as Pigault-Lebrun, (8 April 1753 – 24 July 1835) was a French novelist, playwright, and Epicurean. Victor Hugo references Pigault-Lebrun in chapter I part 8 of Les Misérables, describing a senator as "probably a product of Pigault-le Brun."

== Life ==
He was born at Calais; he is said to have traced his pedigree on the mother's side to Eustache de Saint Pierre. His youth was stormy. He twice carried off young ladies of some position, and was in consequence twice imprisoned by lettre de cachet. The first, a Miss Crawford, the daughter of an English merchant whose office Pigault had entered, died almost immediately after her elopement; the second, Mlle de Salens, he married. He became a soldier in the Queen's Guards, then a very unsuccessful actor, and a teacher of French. At the breaking out of the great war he re-enlisted and fought at Valmy.

He wrote more than twenty plays, and a large number of novels, the first of which appeared in 1787. In his old age he took to graver work, and executed an abridgment of French history in eight volumes, besides some other work. His Œuvres complètes were published in twenty volumes between 1822 and 1824, but much of his work is subsequent to this collection.

The style of Pigault's novels is lively and rich, and the morality is very far from severe. As almost the father of a kind of literature that later developed enormously, Pigault-Lebrun deserves a certain place in literary history. Among the most celebrated of his novels may be mentioned L'Enfant du Carnaval (1792) and Angelique et Jeanneton de la place Maubert (1799). His Citateur (2 vols., 1803), a collection of quotations against Christianity, was forbidden and yet several times reprinted.
