= The Zionist Journey =

Collection of bronze sculptures by Henry Betzalel

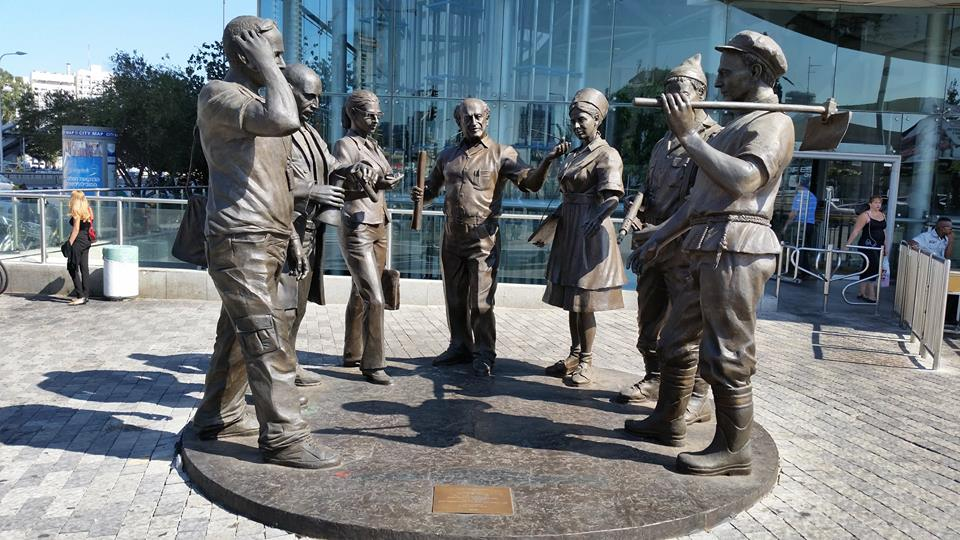
- Artist: Henry Betzalel
- Type: Sculpture
- Medium: Bronze
- Subject: Israel's development
- Location: Azrieli Center, Haifa
- 32.79009°N 34.96414°E

The Zionist Journey (Hebrew: המסע הציוני) is a collection of seven bronze sculptures. Initially located in front of the Azrieli Center in Tel Aviv, Israel, in 2015 it was relocated to the Azrieli mall in Haifa. It represents a period Israel's development since the 1920s. It was created by the sculptor Henry Betzalel, initiated by David Azrieli.

== Bronzes ==
The sculpture consists of seven bronze figures, each representing an aspect of Israel (right to left):

- The period of settlement and Aliyah is represented by a First Aliyah halutz.
- Israeli independence is represented by a Palmach fighter.
- The public health sector is represented by a nurse.
- Israeli architecture is represented by an architect, a sculpture of David Azrieli himself.
- Economic development is represented is represented by a businesswoman.
- The evolution of Israeli science and research is represented by a scientist.
- The development of the technology industry is represented by a computer specialist.

The sculpture was inspired by The Burghers of Calais of Auguste Rodin.

== See also ==
- Israeli sculpture
- Monumental sculpture
