= Jacques de Wissant =

Sculpture by Auguste Rodin

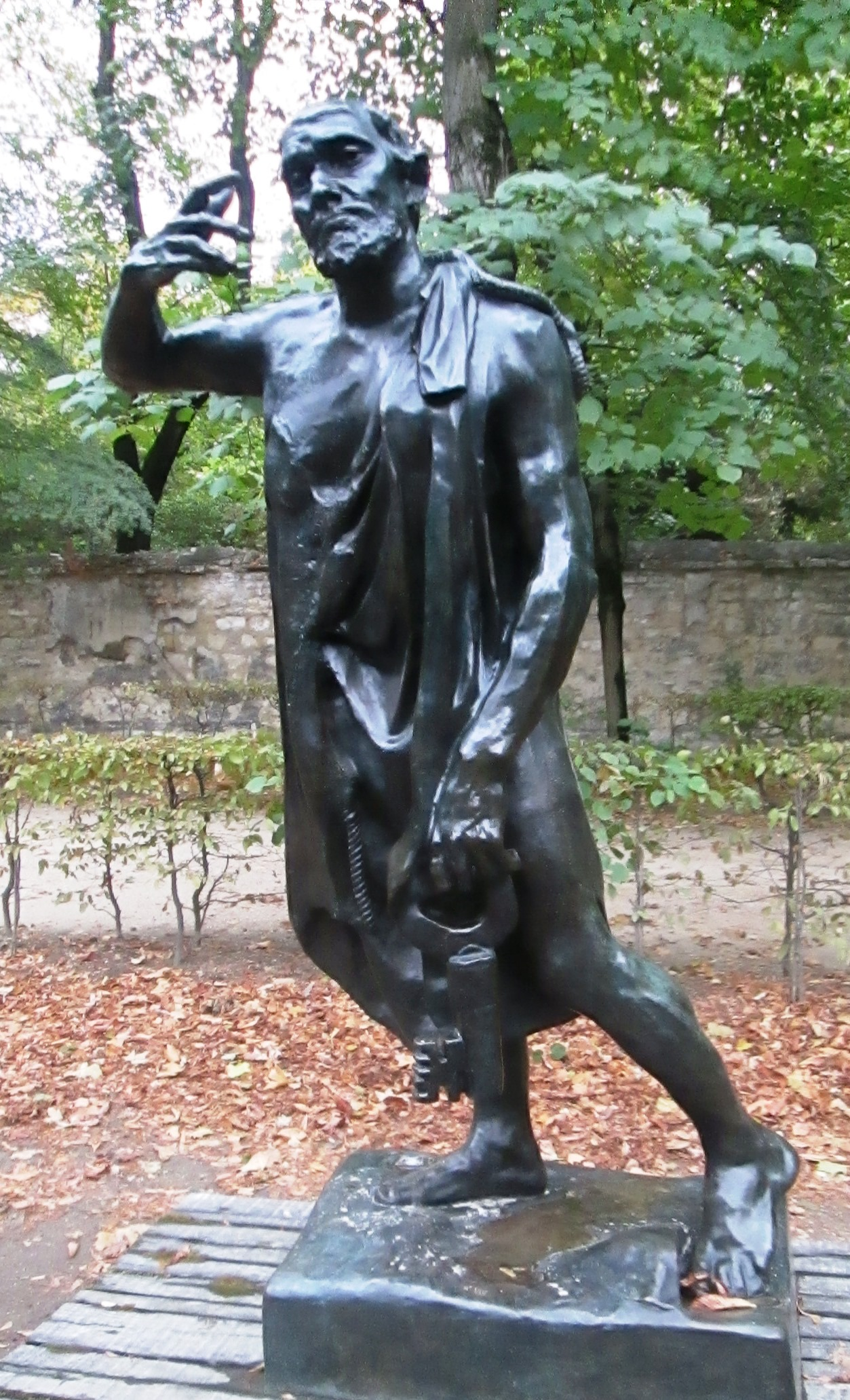
Jacques de Wissant (1885-1887)

Jacques de Wissant was a bronze sculpture created by the French artist Auguste Rodin, in 1885-1887. It holds the key to the city of Calais in its hand. It is part of his overall sculpture The Burghers of Calais. It can be seen there on the Belfry square.

== History ==
Jacques de Wissant was, together with his brother Pierre, one of the six burghers of Calais. Because of the name, it can be assumed that the brothers are from the village of the same name, Wissant, near Calais.

Between 1884 and 1886 Rodin made nude studies of the six personalities. He then draped them with damp canvas. In this way, he wanted to better reproduce how the human figures looked clothed in sackcloth. Before the final sculpture, Rodin made two models and a study of Jacques de Wissant. He also sculpted a left hand.

=== Gallery ===
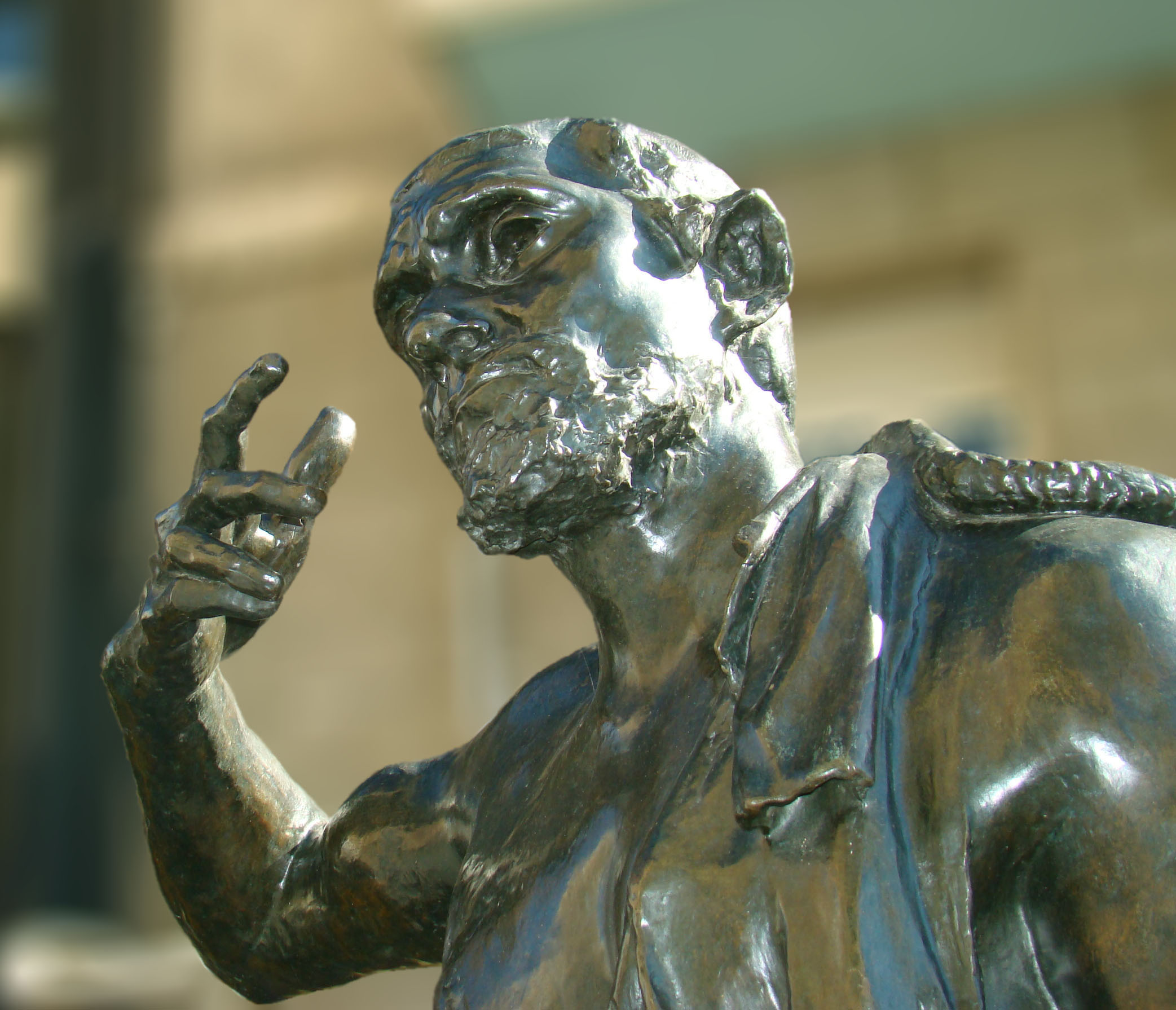
head

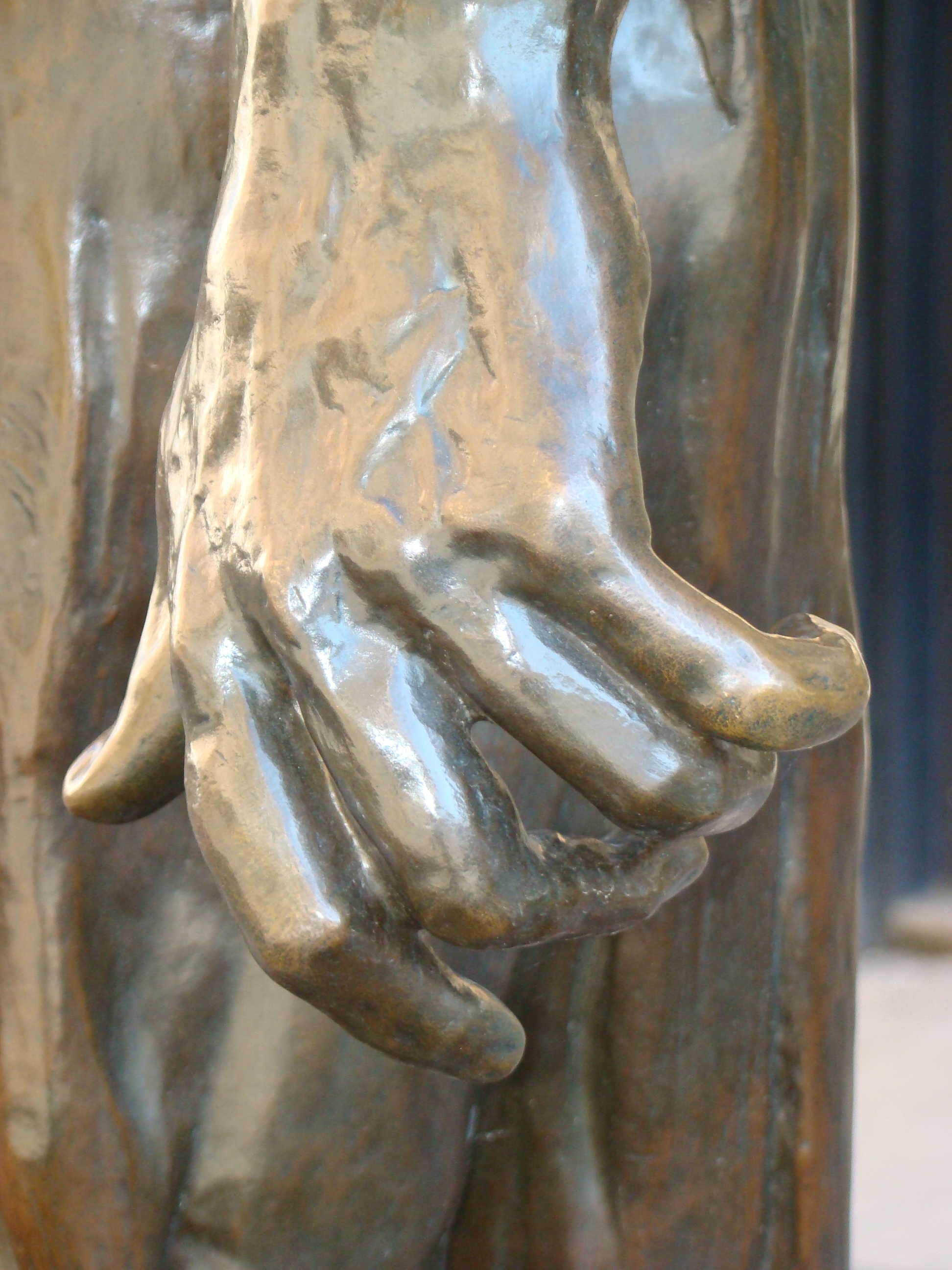
left hand

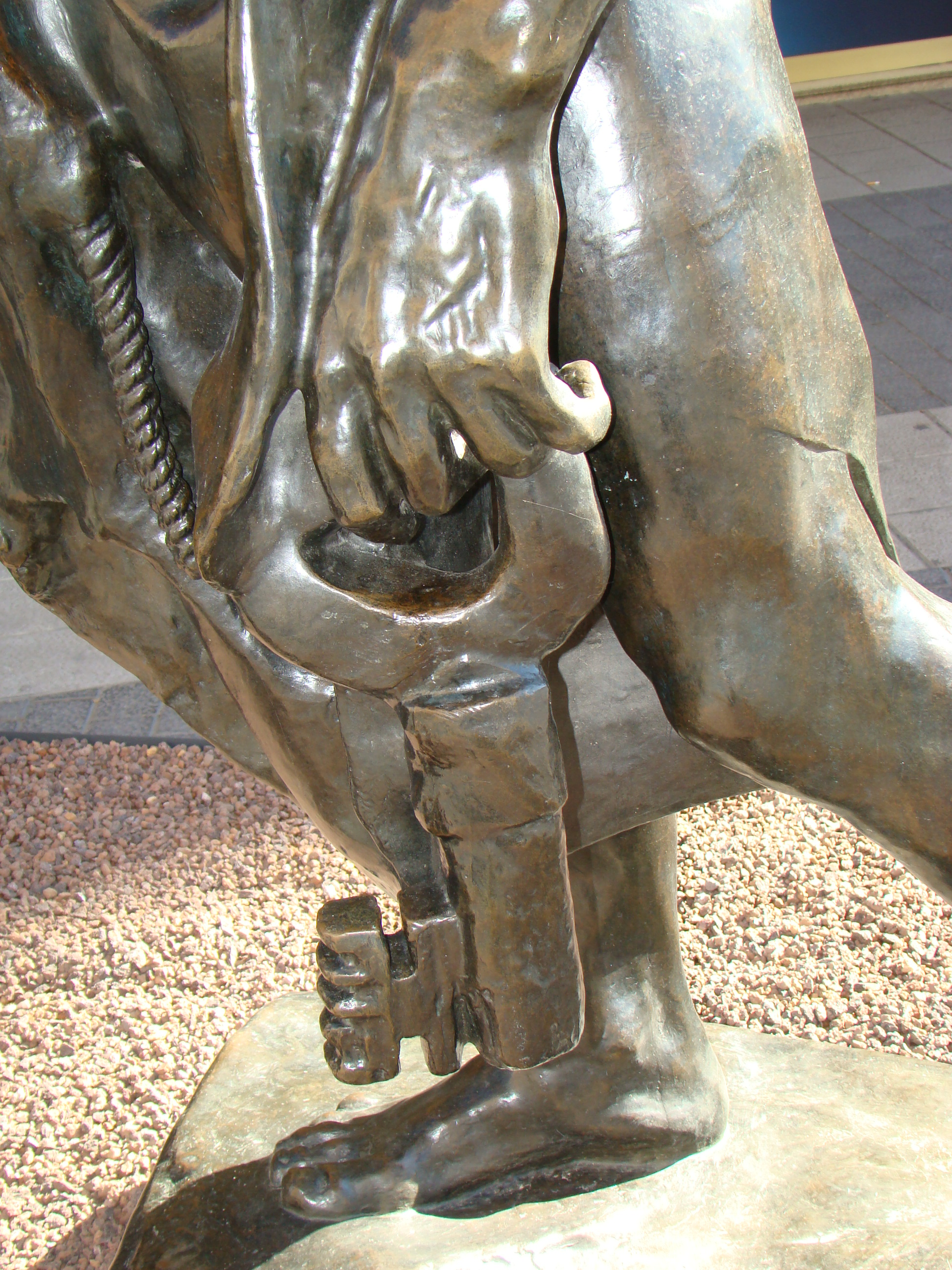
key

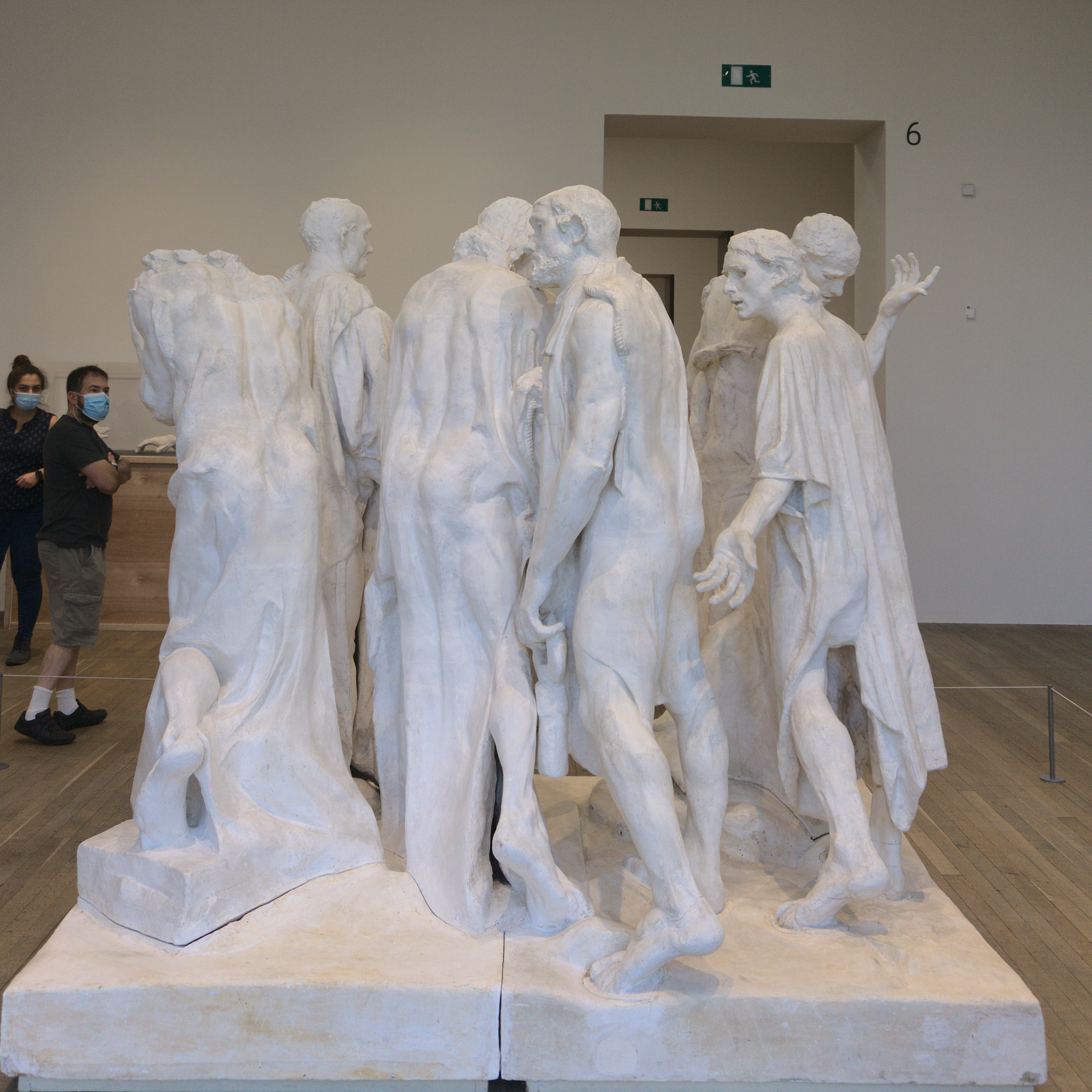
the group

== See also ==
- The Burghers of Calais
