= The Burghers of Calais =

Sculptural group by Auguste Rodin

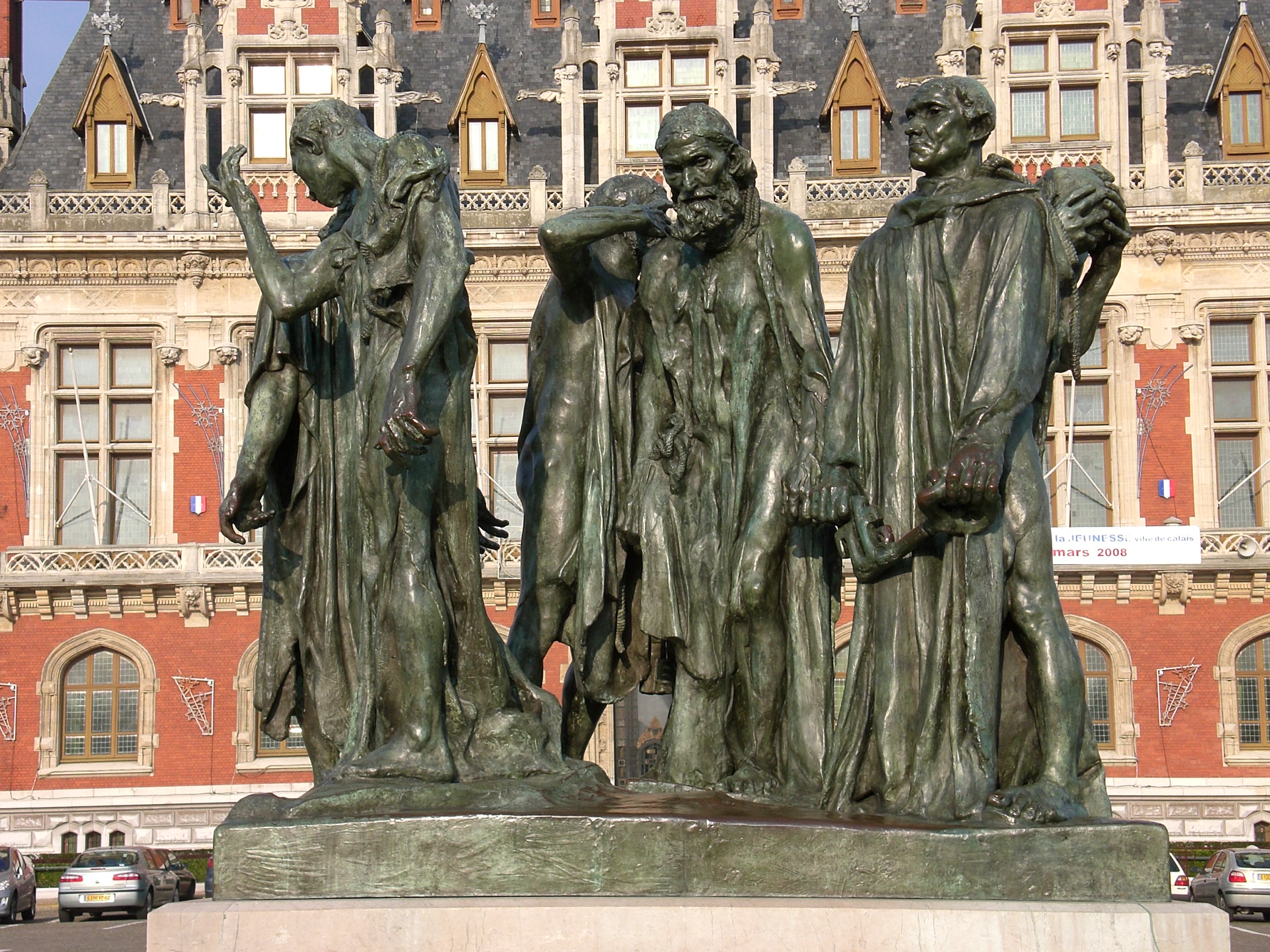
- Artist: Auguste Rodin
- Year: 1884–89
- Type: Bronze
- Dimensions: 201.6 cm × 205.4 cm × 195.9 cm (79 3/8 in × 80 7/8 in × 77 1/8 in)
- Location: Calais, France; 50°57′8.5″N 1°51′12″E

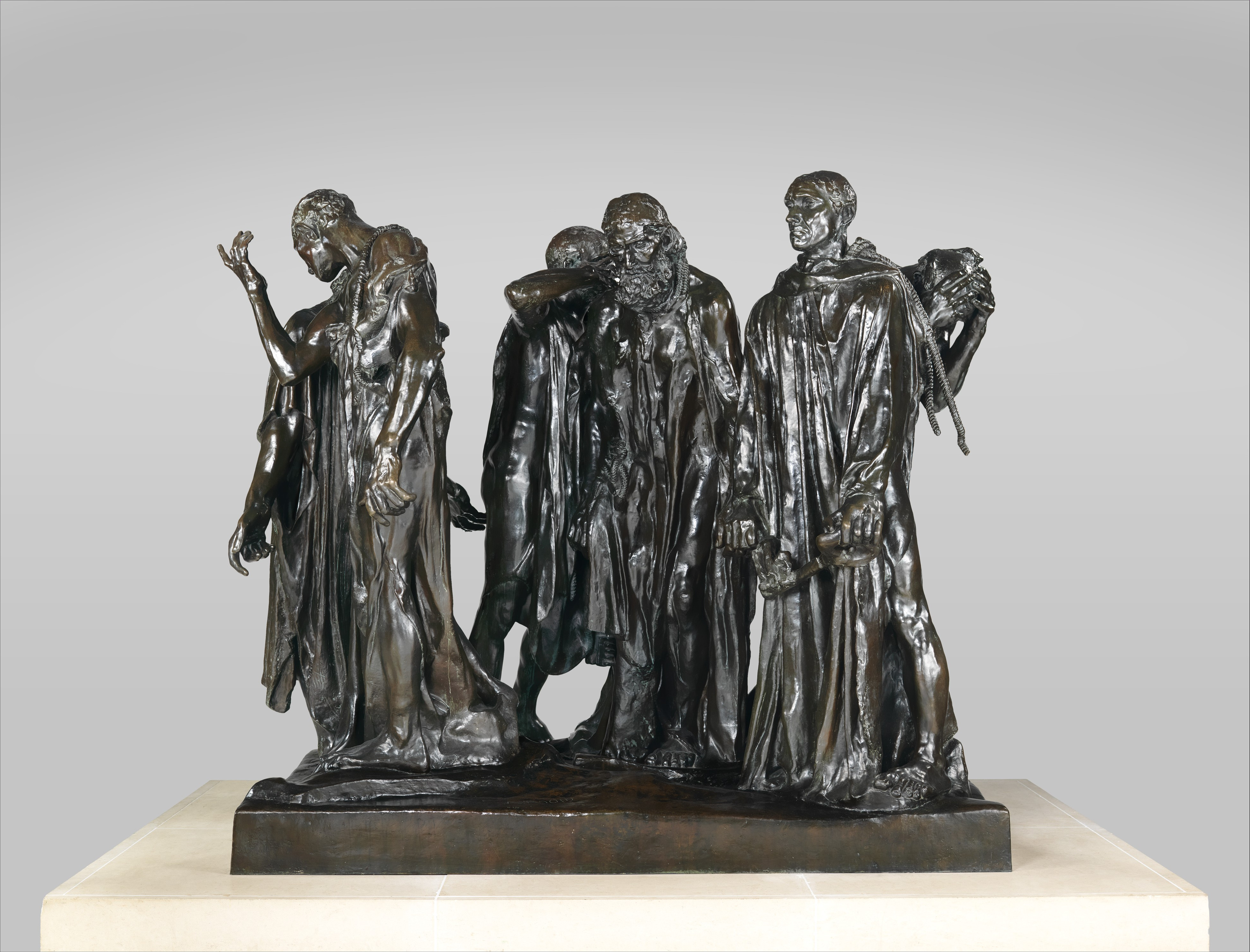
The Burghers at the Metropolitan Museum of Art, New York

The Burghers of Calais (French: Les Bourgeois de Calais) is a sculpture by Auguste Rodin in 12 original castings and numerous copies. It commemorates an event during the Hundred Years' War, when Calais, a French port on the English Channel, surrendered to the English after an 11-month siege. The city commissioned Rodin to create the sculpture in 1884 and the work was completed in 1889.

== History ==
In 1346, England's Edward III, after victory in the Battle of Crécy, laid siege to Calais, while Philip VI of France ordered the city to hold out at all costs. Philip failed to lift the siege, and starvation eventually forced the city to parley for surrender.

The contemporary chronicler Jean Froissart (c. 1337 – c. 1405) tells a story of what happened next: Edward offered to spare the people of the city if six of its leaders would surrender themselves to him, presumably to be executed. Edward demanded they walk out wearing nooses around their necks, and carrying the keys to the city and castle. One of the wealthiest of the town leaders, Eustache de Saint Pierre, volunteered first, and five other burghers joined with him. Saint Pierre led this envoy of volunteers to the city gates. It was this moment, and this poignant mix of defeat, heroic self-sacrifice, and willingness to face imminent death which Rodin captured in his sculpture, scaled somewhat larger than life.

According to Froissart's story, the burghers expected to be executed, but their lives were spared by the intervention of England's queen, Philippa of Hainault, who persuaded her husband to exercise mercy by claiming their deaths would be a bad omen for her unborn child.

== Composition ==
The City of Calais had attempted to erect a statue of Eustache de Saint Pierre, eldest of the burghers, since 1845. Two prior artists were prevented from creating the sculpture: David d'Angers by his death, and Auguste Clésinger by the Franco-Prussian War. In 1884 the municipal corporation of the city invited several artists, Rodin amongst them, to submit proposals for the project.

Rodin's design, which included all six figures rather than just de Saint Pierre, was controversial. The public felt that it lacked "overtly heroic antique references" which were considered integral to public sculpture. It was not a pyramidal arrangement and contained no allegorical figures. It was intended to be placed at ground level, rather than on a pedestal. The burghers were not presented in a positive image of glory; instead, they display "pain, anguish and fatalism". To Rodin, this was nevertheless heroic, the heroism of self-sacrifice.

In 1895 the monument was installed in Calais on a large pedestal in front of Parc Richelieu, a public park, contrary to the sculptor's wishes, who wanted contemporary townsfolk to "almost bump into" the figures and feel solidarity with them. Only later was his vision realised, when the sculpture was moved in front of the newly completed town hall of Calais, where it now rests on a much lower base.

== Depicted persons ==
The six burghers depicted are:

- Eustache de Saint Pierre
- Jacques de Wissant
- Pierre de Wissant
- Jean de Fiennes
- Andrieu d'Andres
- Jean d'Aire

== Casts ==
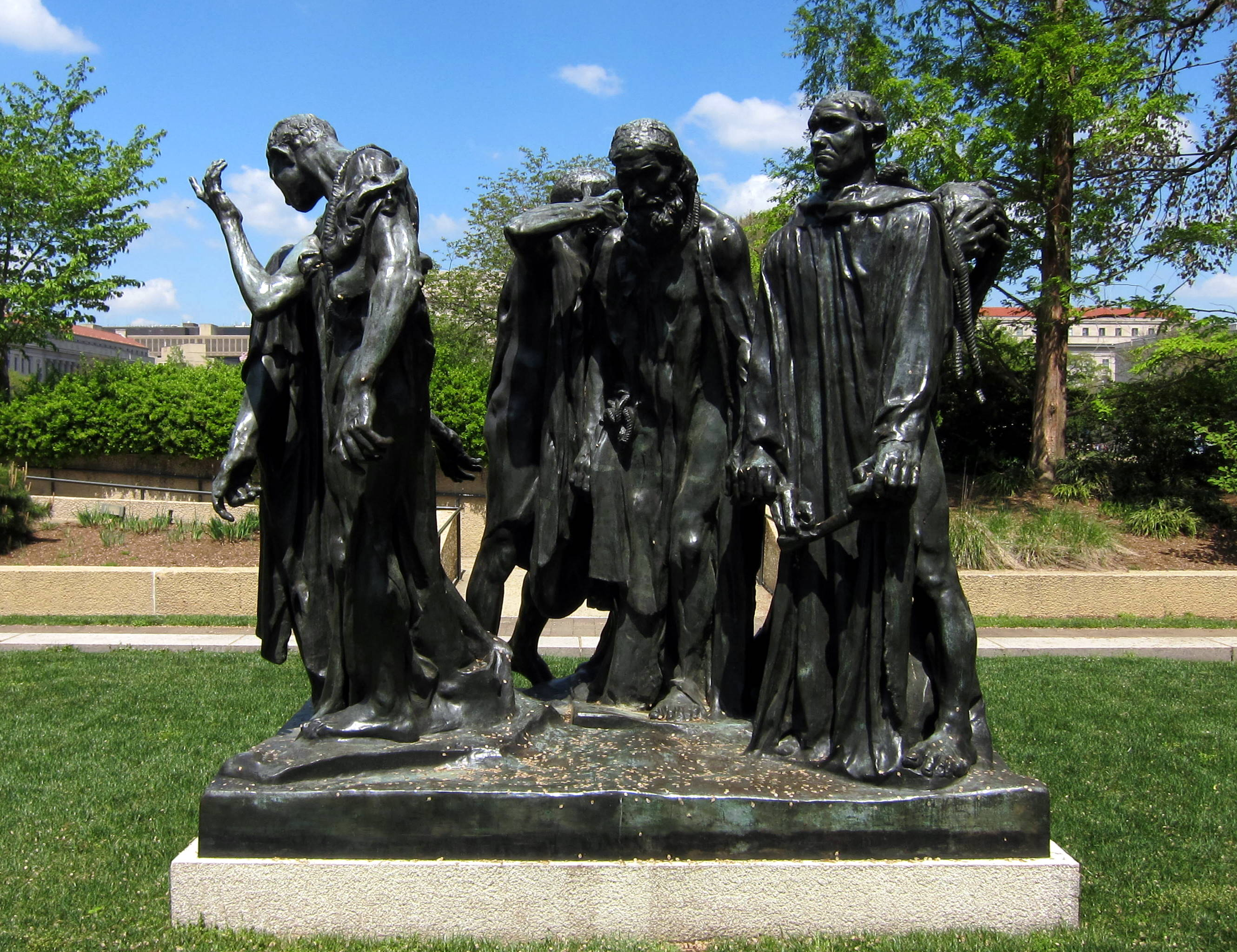
Cast in the Hirshhorn Sculpture Garden, Washington, D.C.

Under French law, no more than 12 original casts of works of Rodin may be made.

The 1895 cast of the group of six figures still stands in Calais. Other original casts stand at:

- Glyptoteket in Copenhagen, cast 1903;
- the Musée royal de Mariemont in Morlanwelz, Belgium, cast 1905 (currently on loan to the city of Mons);
- Victoria Tower Gardens adjacent to the Houses of Parliament in London; cast 1908, installed on this site in 1914 and unveiled 19 July 1915;
- the Rodin Museum in Philadelphia, cast 1925 and installed in 1929;
- the gardens of the Musée Rodin in Paris, cast 1926 and given to the museum in 1955;
- Kunstmuseum in Basel, cast 1943 and installed in 1948;
- the Smithsonian Hirshhorn Museum and Sculpture Garden in Washington, DC, cast 1943 and installed in 1966;
- the National Museum of Western Art in Tokyo, cast 1953 and installed in 1959;
- the Norton Simon Museum in Pasadena, California, cast 1968;
- the Metropolitan Museum of Art in New York City, cast 1985 and installed in 1989;

and

- Plateau (formerly called Rodin Gallery and closed since 2016) in Seoul. After 9 years out of public view, as of the spring of 2025, this cast is on display at Leeum Museum of Art in the permanent collection. This is the twelfth and final original cast and was cast in 1995.

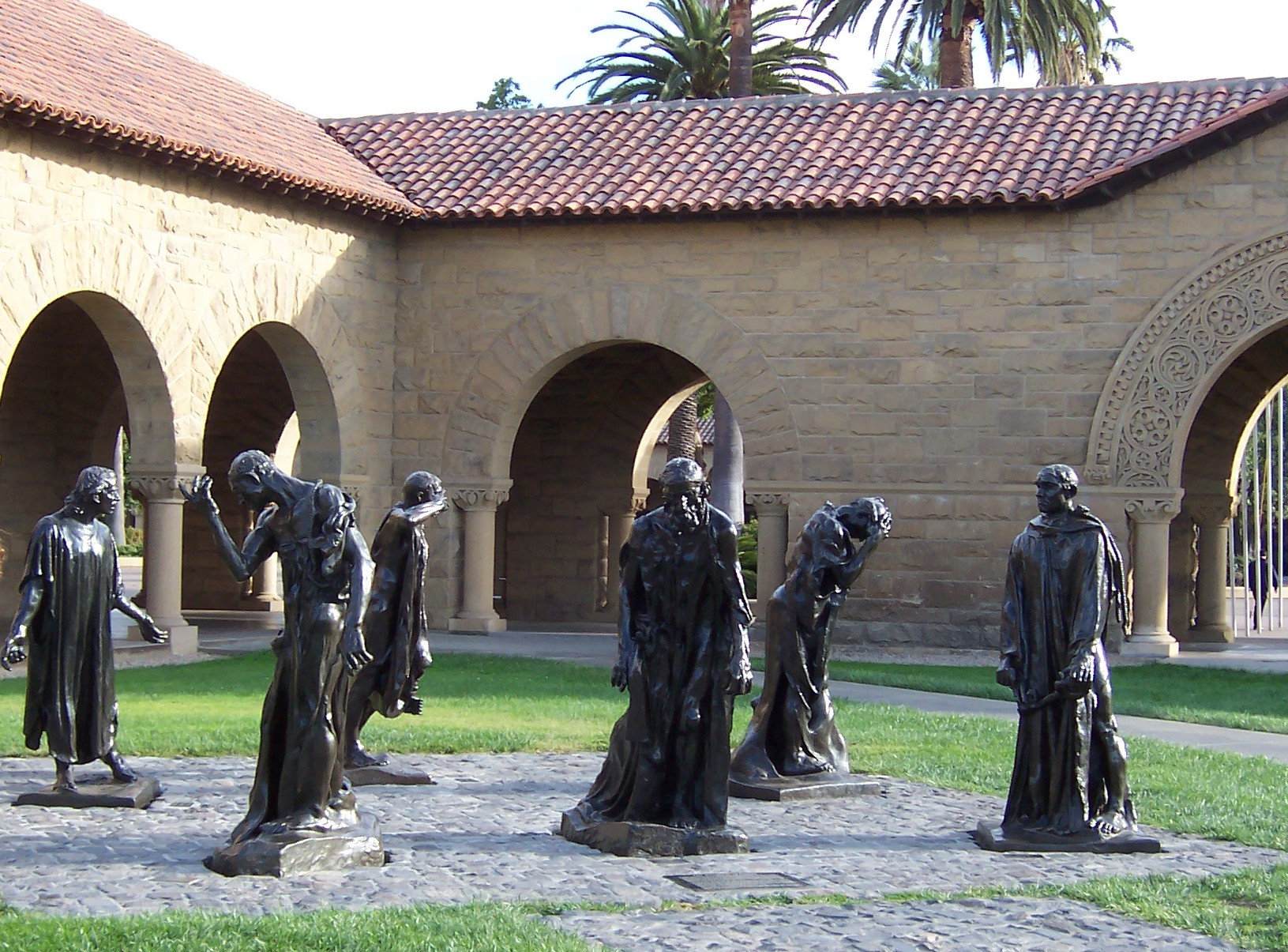
Memorial Court, Stanford University

Copies of individual statues are:

- sculptures of all individual figures on the campus of Stanford University;
- sculptures of all individual figures (casts from 1984 till 1988) and the First Maquette of the Burghers of Calais, cast 1987, in the Shizuoka Prefectural Museum of Art, Shizuoka City, Japan;
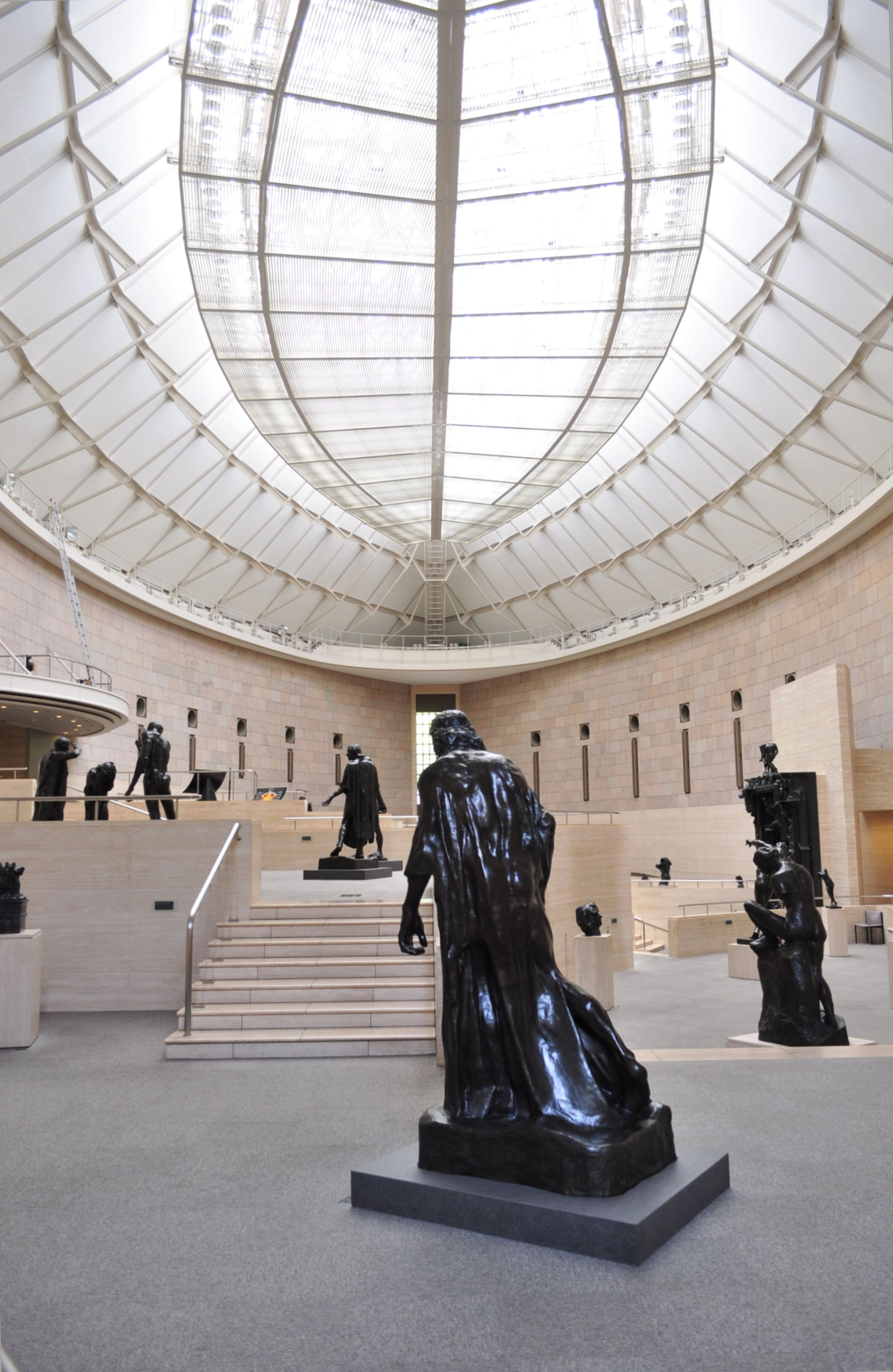
  The Burghers of Calais, Rodin Wing, Shizuoka Prefectural Museum of Art
- sculptures of Jean d'Aire and Jean de Fiennes as well as busts of d'Aire and Pierre de Wissant on display at the Los Angeles County Museum of Art in the Sculpture Garden;
- a study of Jean d'Aire at Visual Arts Center at Davidson College, cast in 1972;
- "The man with the key" figure (Jean d'Aire), on the Sommerro Park in Oslo, Norway; and
- a bust of Jean d'Aire, recovered a quarter mile away from Ground Zero, together with other pieces from works by Rodin which were in the corporate offices of Cantor Fitzgerald at the original One World Trade Center.

== Gallery ==
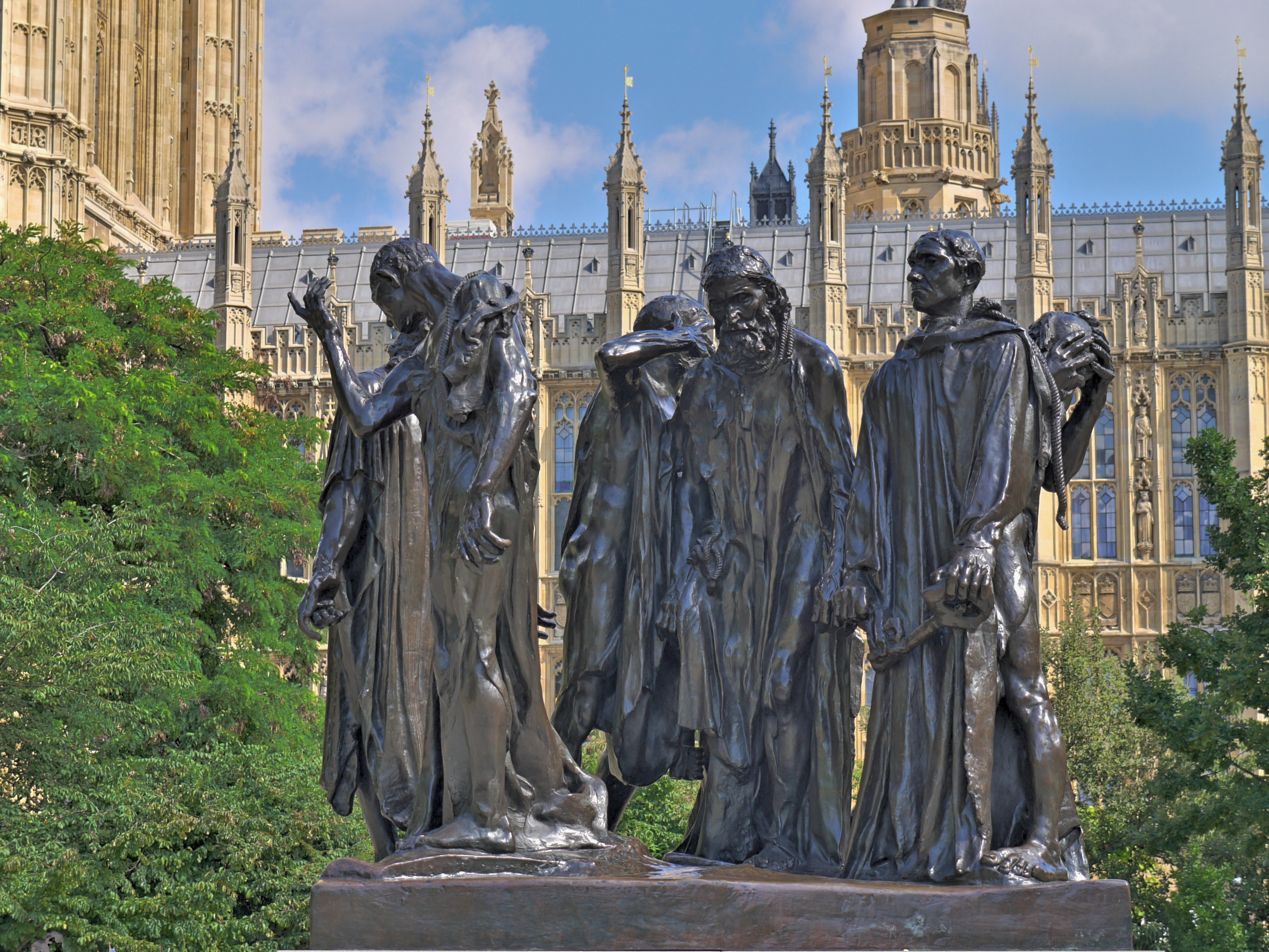
The London cast of The Burghers of Calais, with the Palace of Westminster in the background

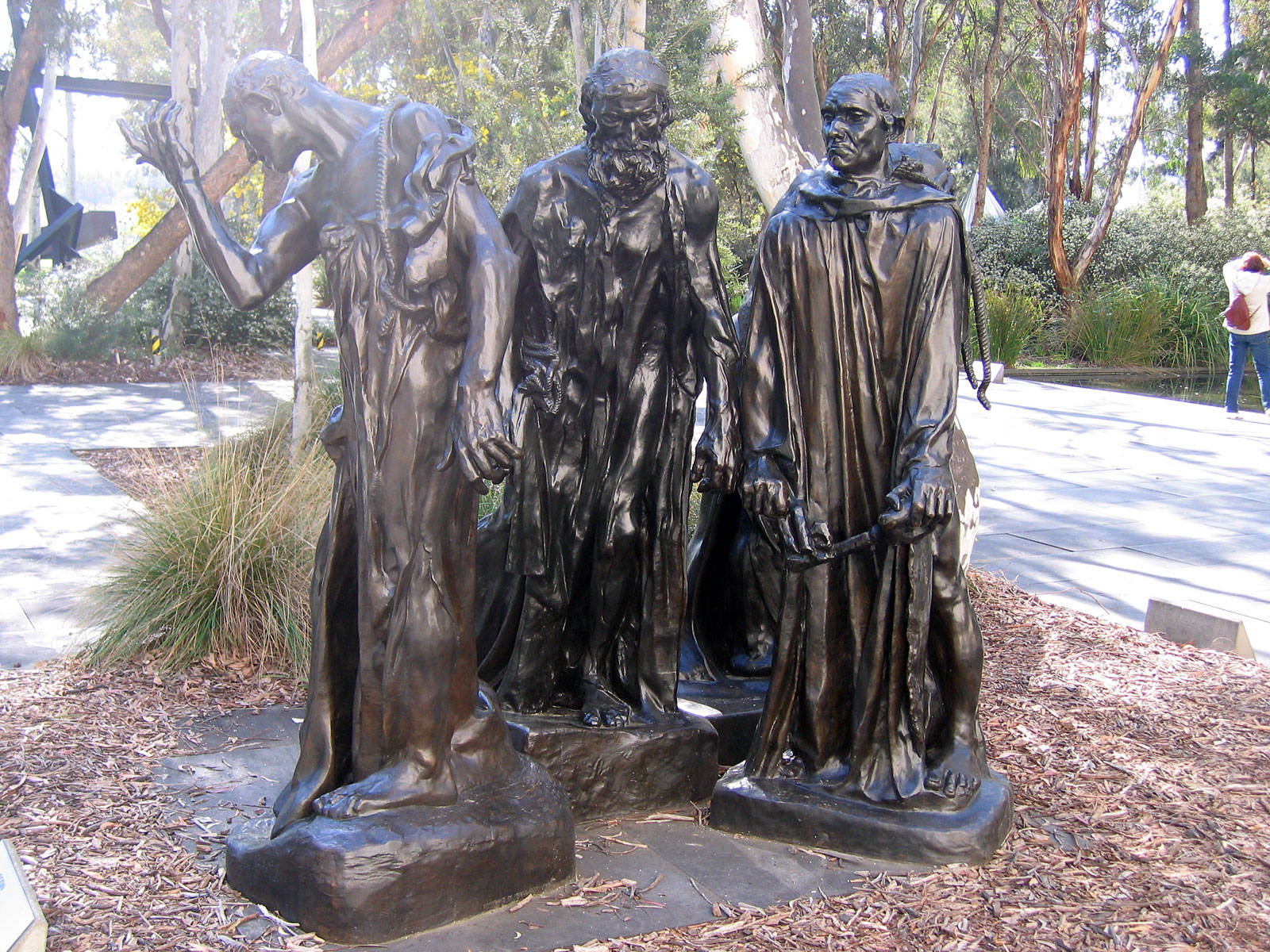
Cast in the National Gallery of Australia, Canberra

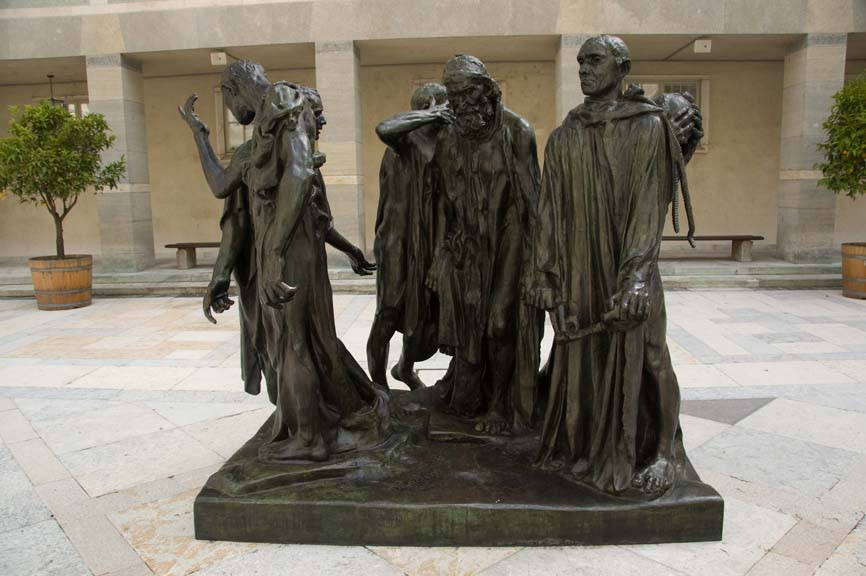
Cast in the Kunstmuseum, Basel

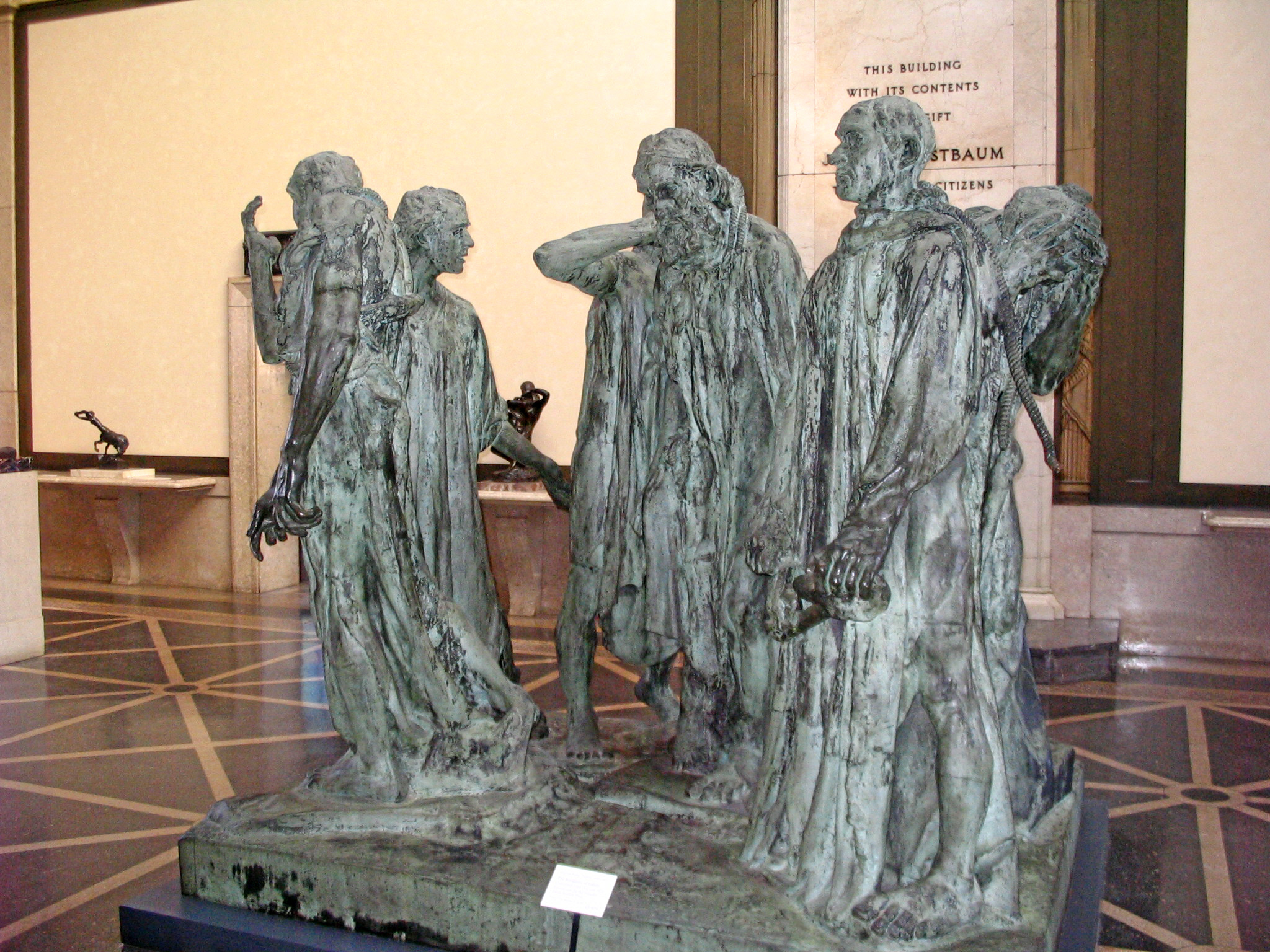
Cast in the Rodin Museum, Philadelphia

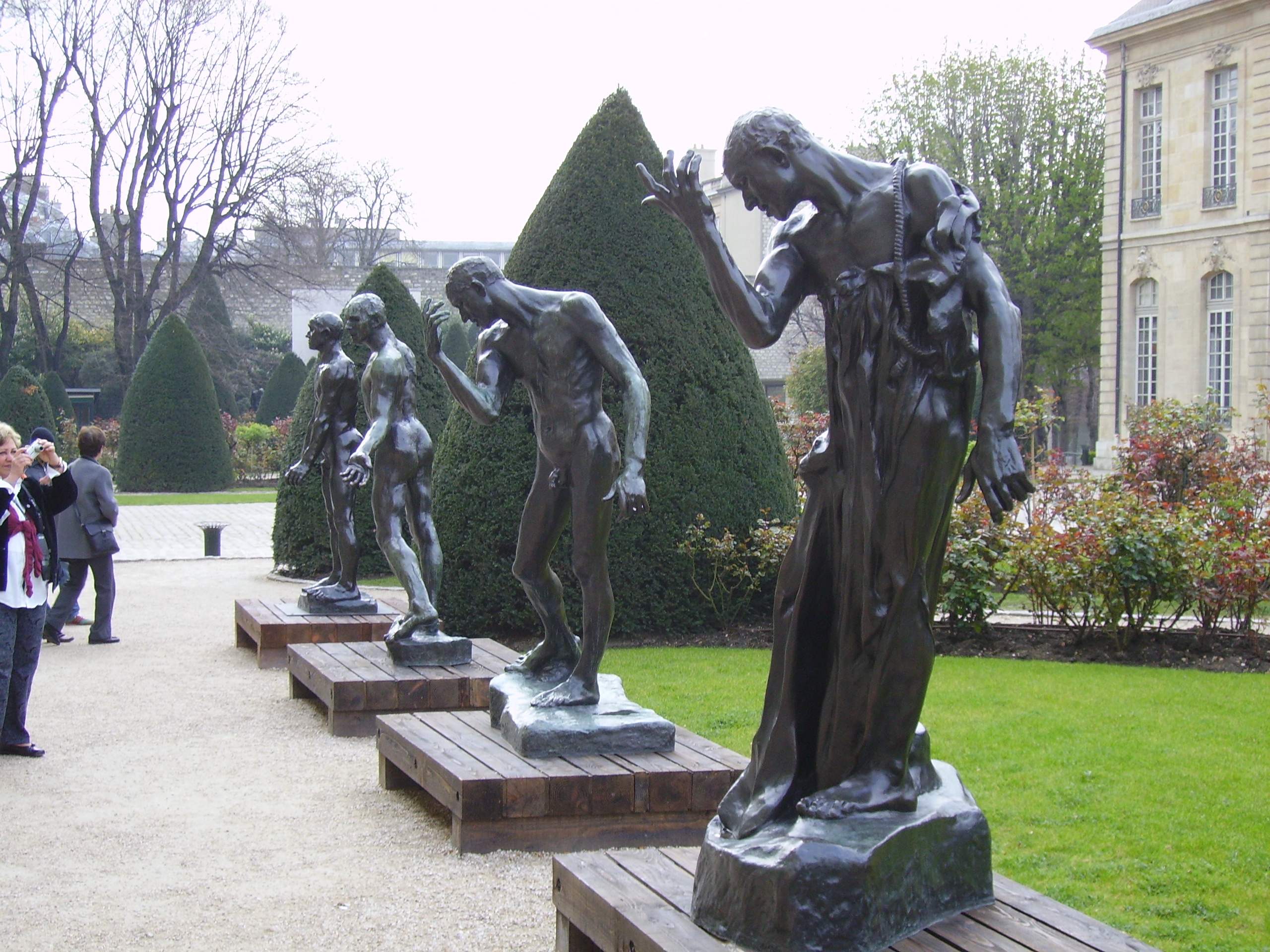
Casts in the garden of the Musée Rodin, Paris

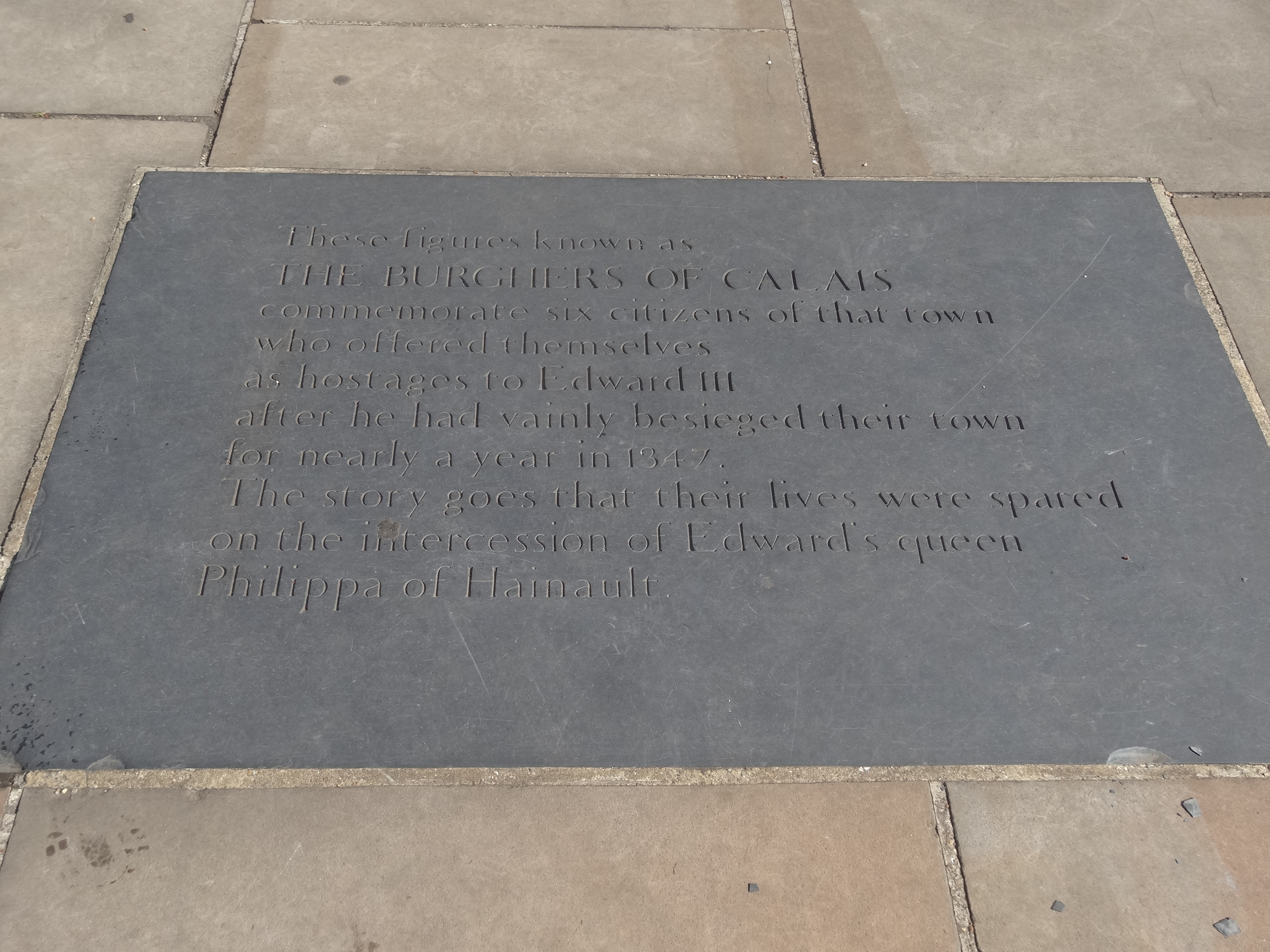
Plaque accompanying the Burghers memorial in Victoria Tower Gardens, London
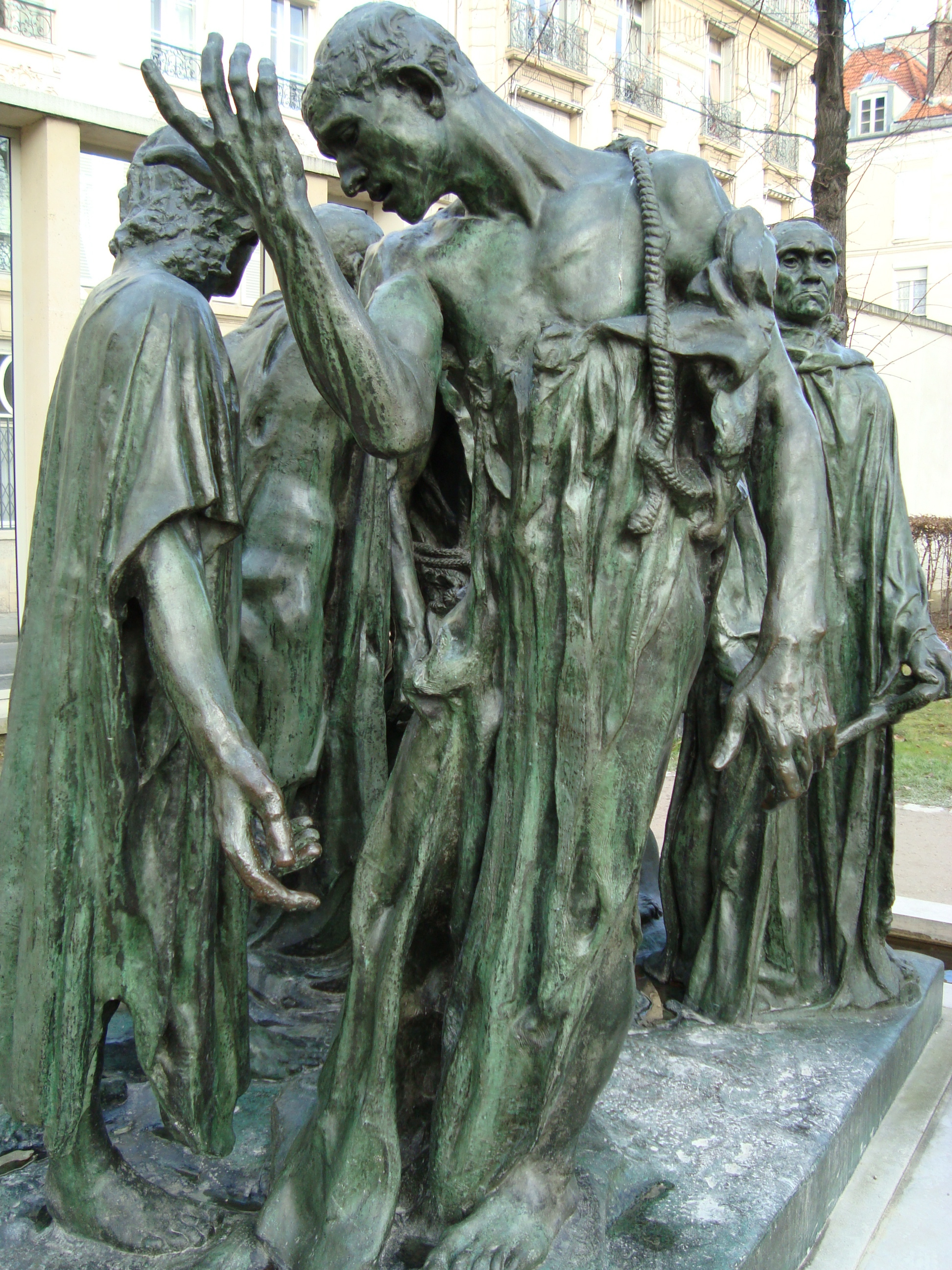
Cast in the Musée Rodin, Paris

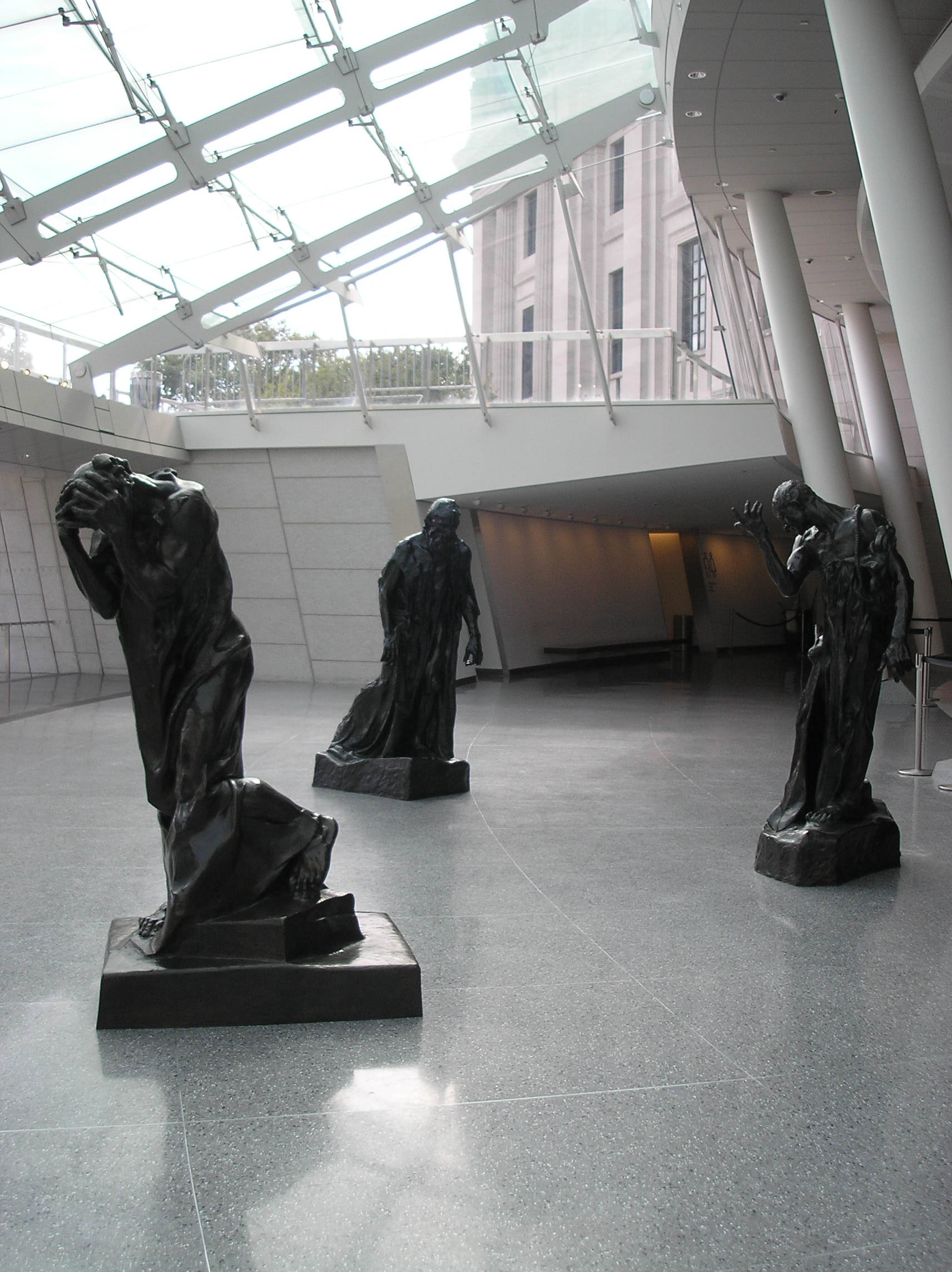
Casts in the Brooklyn Museum, New York City

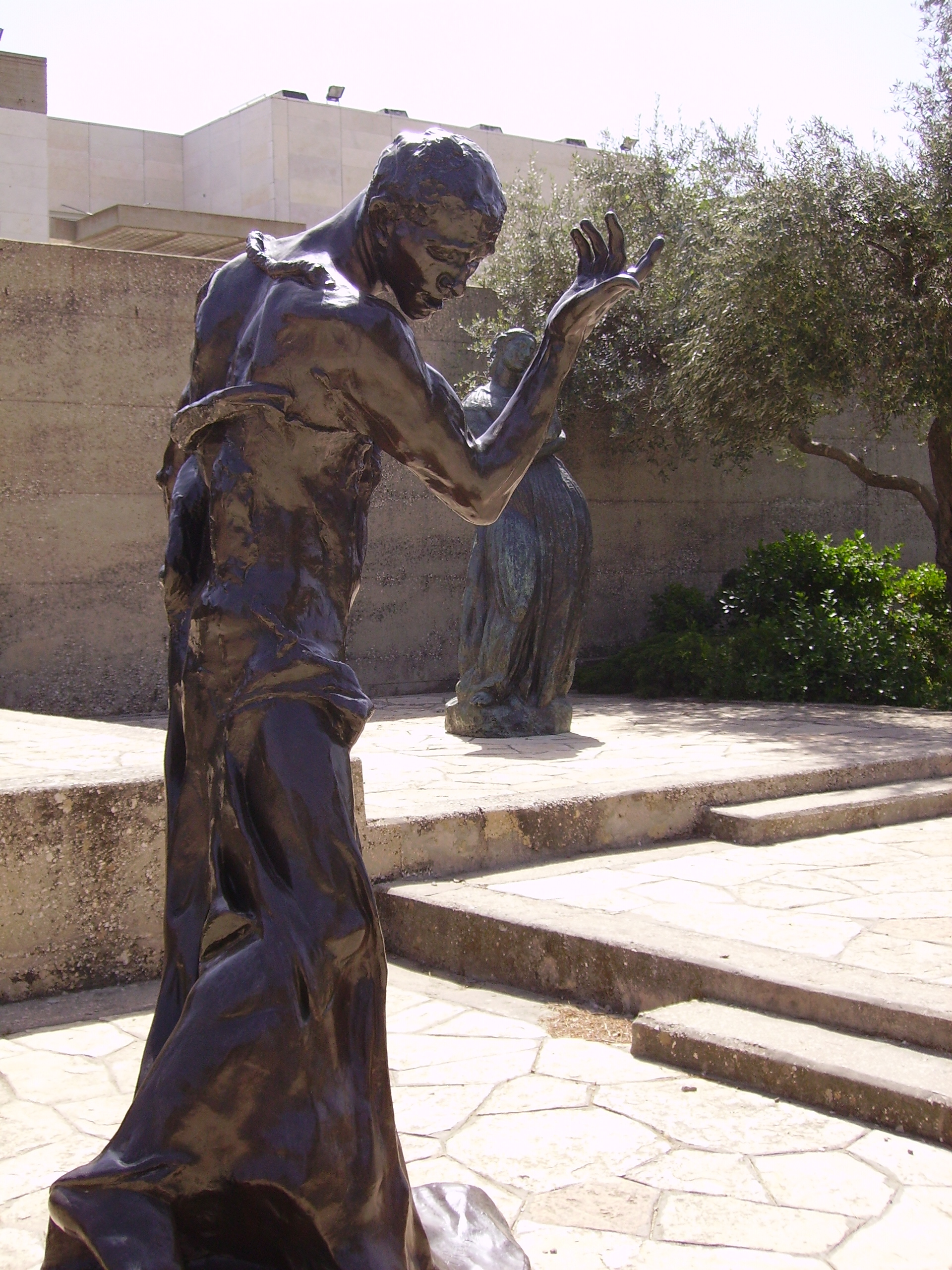
Casts in the Israel Museum, Jerusalem. In the foreground, the cast for Pierre de Wiessant

== See also ==
- List of sculptures by Auguste Rodin
- The Zionist Journey
