= Jean d'Aire =

Sculpture by Auguste Rodin

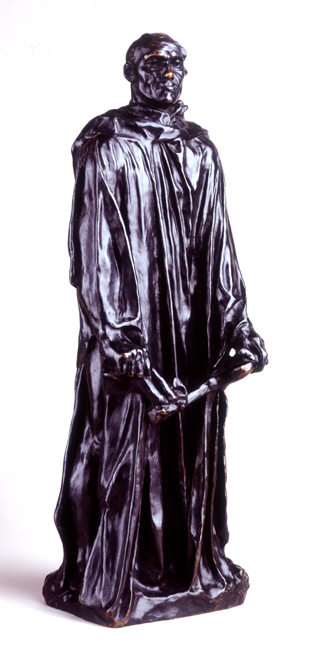
- Artist: Auguste Rodin
- Year: 1885-1886 (conception)
- Medium: Plaster, later cast in bronze

Jean d'Aire is a sculpture by the French artist Auguste Rodin, first conceived around 1885 as part of the planning for his group The Burghers of Calais.

== Versions ==
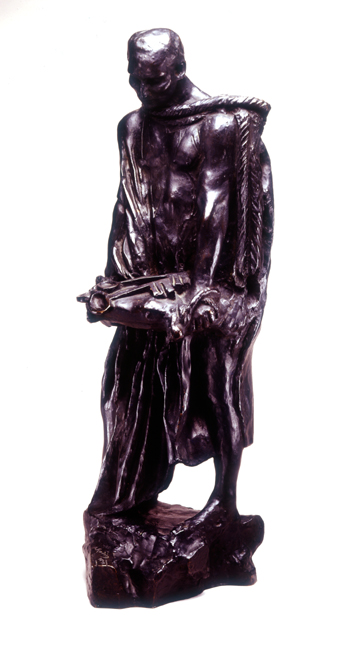
Second modello for Jean d´Aire. Museo Soumaya

After the first group modello, he made individual studies of each figure.

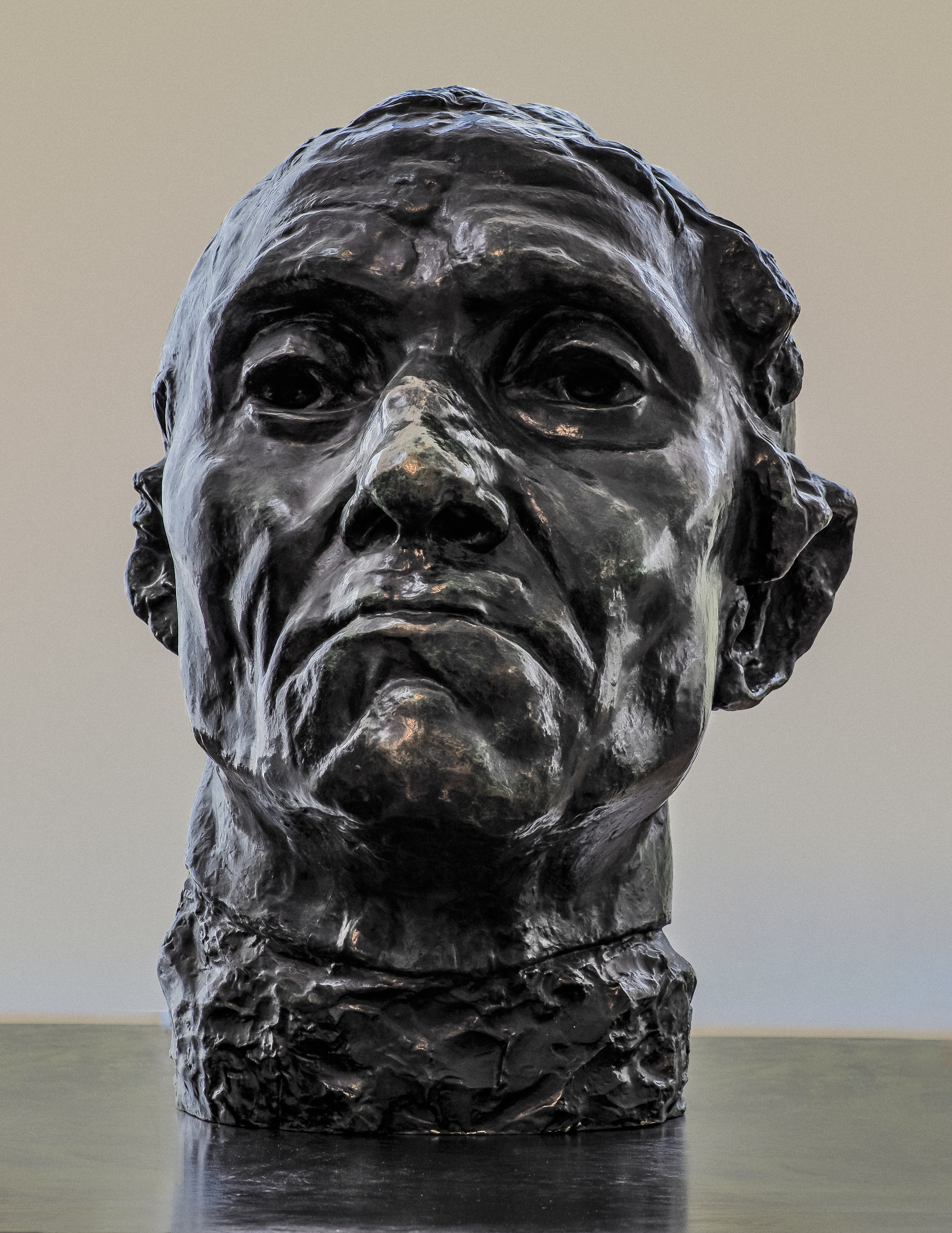
Jean d'Aire

The first such study of d'Aire was nude, followed by one partially covered in a kind of toga and with the noose round his neck more obvious. He holds a cushion bearing the keys of Calais and is drawn to the left by the noose. A bronze cast of this second version is now in the Museo Soumaya in Mexico City and other collections.

== See also ==
- List of sculptures by Auguste Rodin
