= Eustache de Saint Pierre =

Lead figure of the Burghers of Calais in 1347

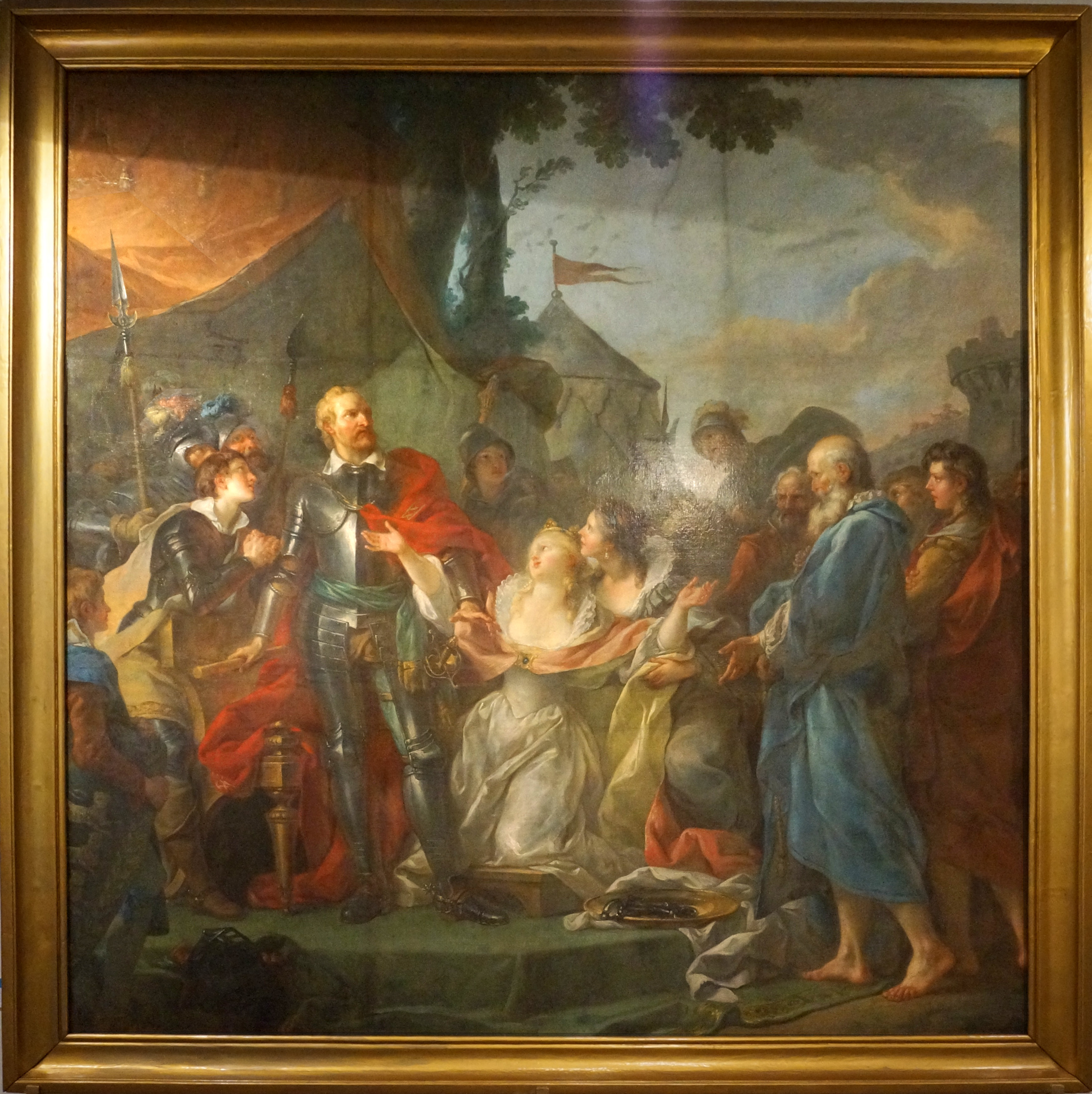
Eustache de Saint Pierre, by Jean-Simon Berthélemy

Eustache de Saint Pierre is the best-known figure of the group of six known as The Burghers of Calais, the first to volunteer and surrender, wearing "a shirt and a rope around his neck" to the King of England at that time, Edward III, to save the people of Calais (August 1347).

According to the chronicler Jean Froissart, the king pardoned him at the request of his wife, Philippa of Hainault.

The scene of the surrender of the mayor of Calais was immortalized in a bronze statue by Rodin and can be seen in twelve copies, including the Belfry square in Calais, the Metropolitan Museum of Art in New York, the Victoria Tower Gardens adjoining Parliament in London, or at the art museum Glyptotek in Copenhagen (Denmark), and the Musée Rodin in Paris. A cast of the figure representing Saint Pierre is in the Museo Soumaya in Mexico City. A cast is also in Memorial Plaza at The College of the Holy Cross in Worcester, Massachusetts, USA.
