= Jean de Fiennes =

Sculpture by Auguste Rodin

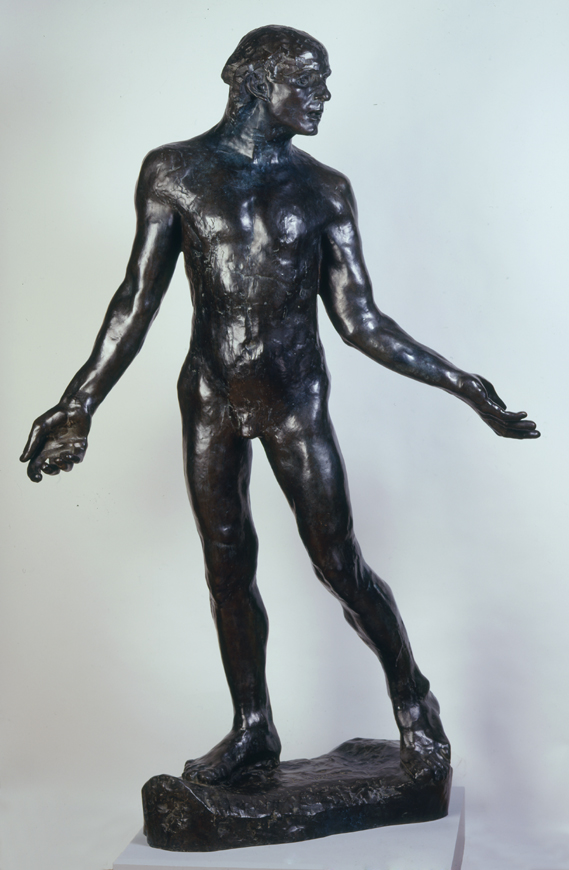
- Artist: Auguste Rodin
- Year: 1885-1886
- Medium: Bronze cast

Jean de Fiennes, in real life Jean de Vienne, is a sculpture by the French artist Auguste Rodin, first produced between 1885 and 1886. A bronze cast of it is now in the Museo Soumaya in Mexico City.

== Burghers of Calais ==
It is an individual nude modello for his group The Burghers of Calais, showing Jean de Vienne, captain of Calais and the youngest of the burghers who surrendered to protect the citizens of Calais. However, de Fiennes' name was only assigned to one of the burghers long after the historical event in 1346.

== Versions ==
Rodin made individual modellos of the figures to study the proportions of the figure and how each would emote aspects of the heroic. In one version of the modello for de Fiennes, Rodin he showed the figure's arms tense and fists clenched, while in another he showed his hands open and his arms by his sides.

A second modello has a nude torso with arms extended and palms upwards; from his forearms a shirt is held – a shirt which covers his lower body and his legs. His face is in profile facing left.

A third study shows him with no arms, totally covered by a robe from shoulders to feet, with more hair on his head and with more detail in the facial features. In the final group the figure is clothed but has his arms extended as in the first nude modello. However, overall the figure of de Fiennes in the final group is the one with the most changes from the initial modello.

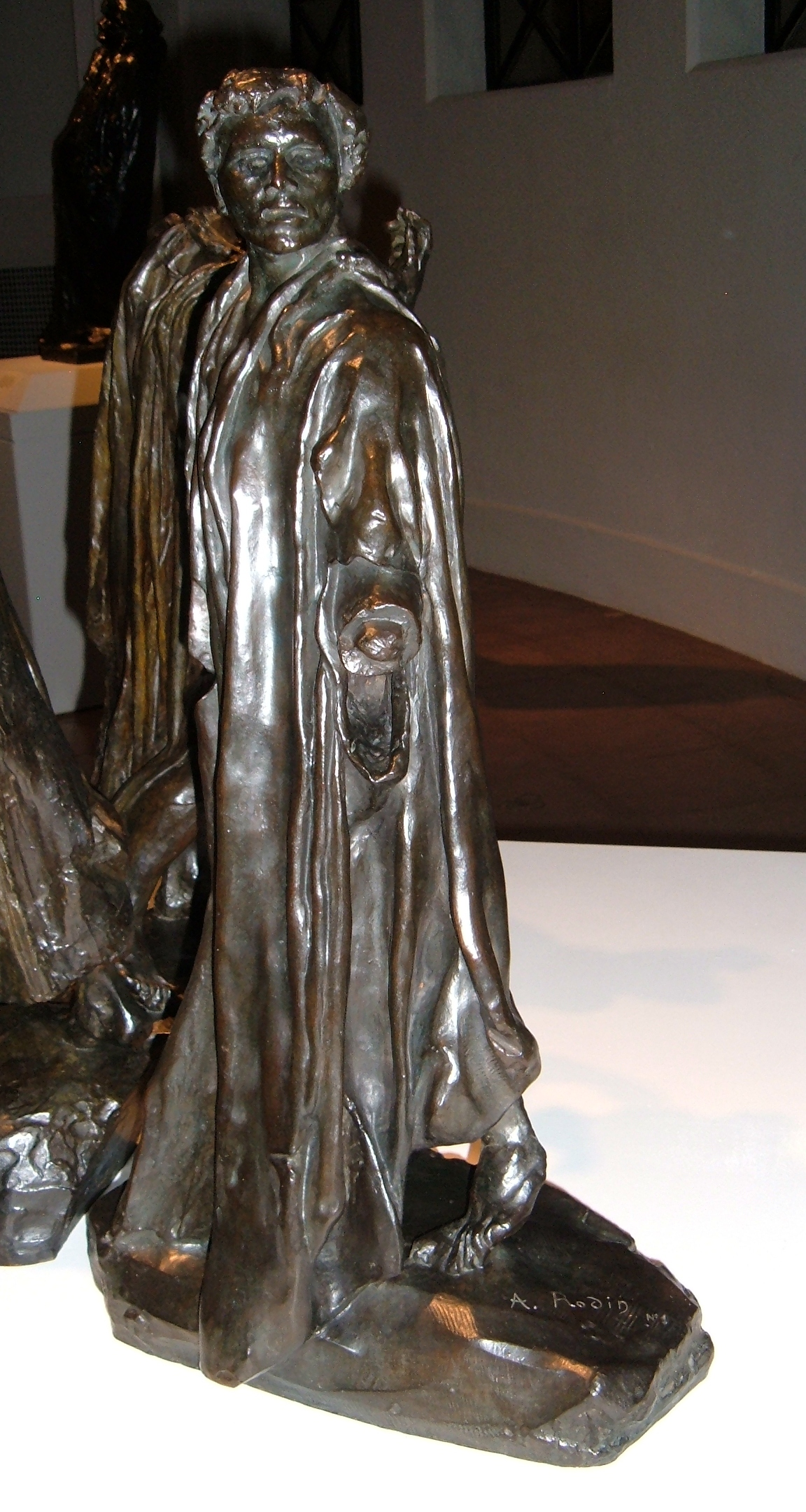
Third study

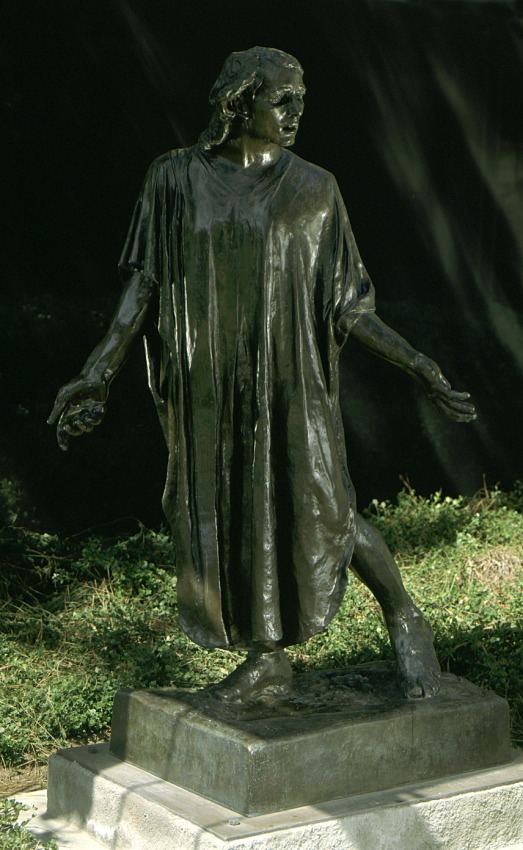
Modello used in final group

== See also ==
- List of sculptures by Auguste Rodin
