= Pierre de Wiessant =

Sculpture by Auguste Rodin

Pierre de Wissant
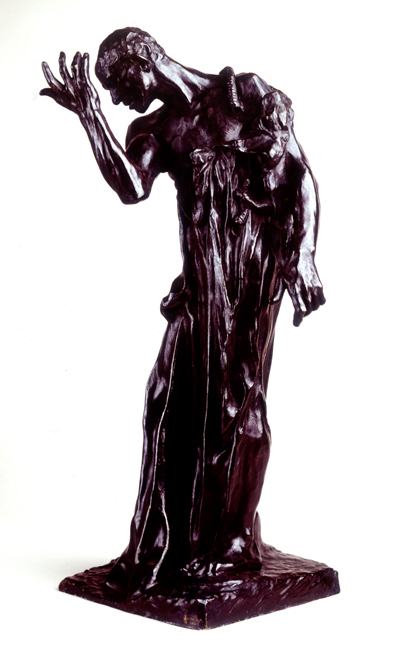
- Pierre de Wissant, part of The Burghers of Calais
- Artist: Auguste Rodin
- Year: 1887
- Type: Sculpture
- Medium: Bronze
- Location: KMSKA; Antwerp

Pierre de Wissant is a bronze sculpture by French artist Auguste Rodin, part of his sculptural group The Burghers of Calais. This sculpture represents one of the six burghers who, according to Jean Froissart surrendered themselves in 1347, at the beginning of the Hundred Years' War (1337–1453), in order to save the inhabitants of the French city of Calais from the English laying siege to the city.

== Work ==
Between 1884 and 1886, Rodin created nude studies of each of the burghers, then draped them in wet canvas in order to determine how the human figures would look clothed with sackcloth, as their real-life counterparts were supposed to have worn when surrendering to Edward III of England.

Rodin made two models and one study of Pierre de Wissant before the final sculpture. The first model shows the young man pointing to himself with the right hand, as if questioning his final destination. In the nude study he is no longer pointing to himself, but using his arm in a defensive manner. Elsen mentions that both Auguste's son and actor Coquelin Cadet have been named as possible reference models.

== Gallery ==
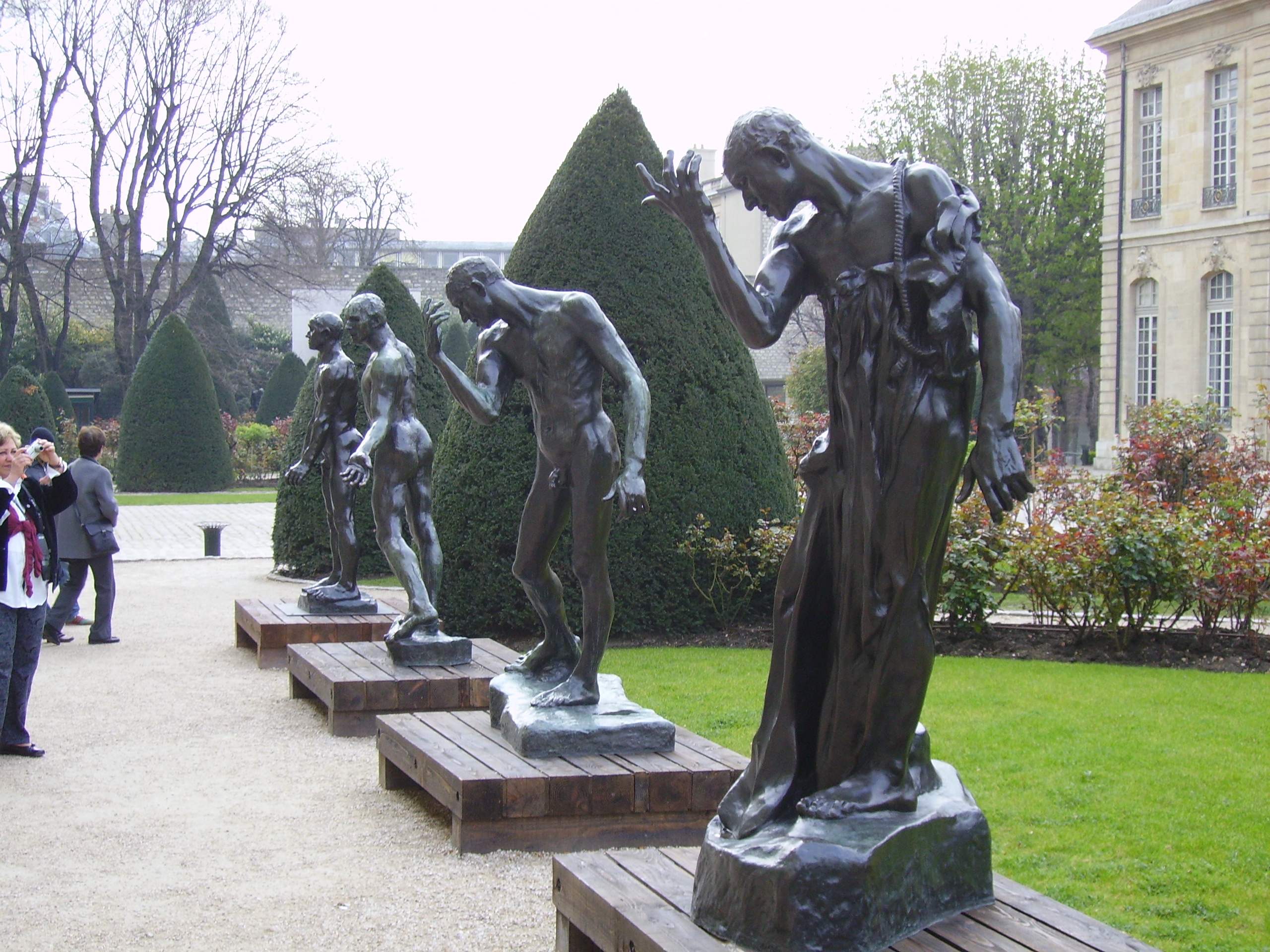
Two studies of Pierre de Wissant at the Musée Rodin in Paris

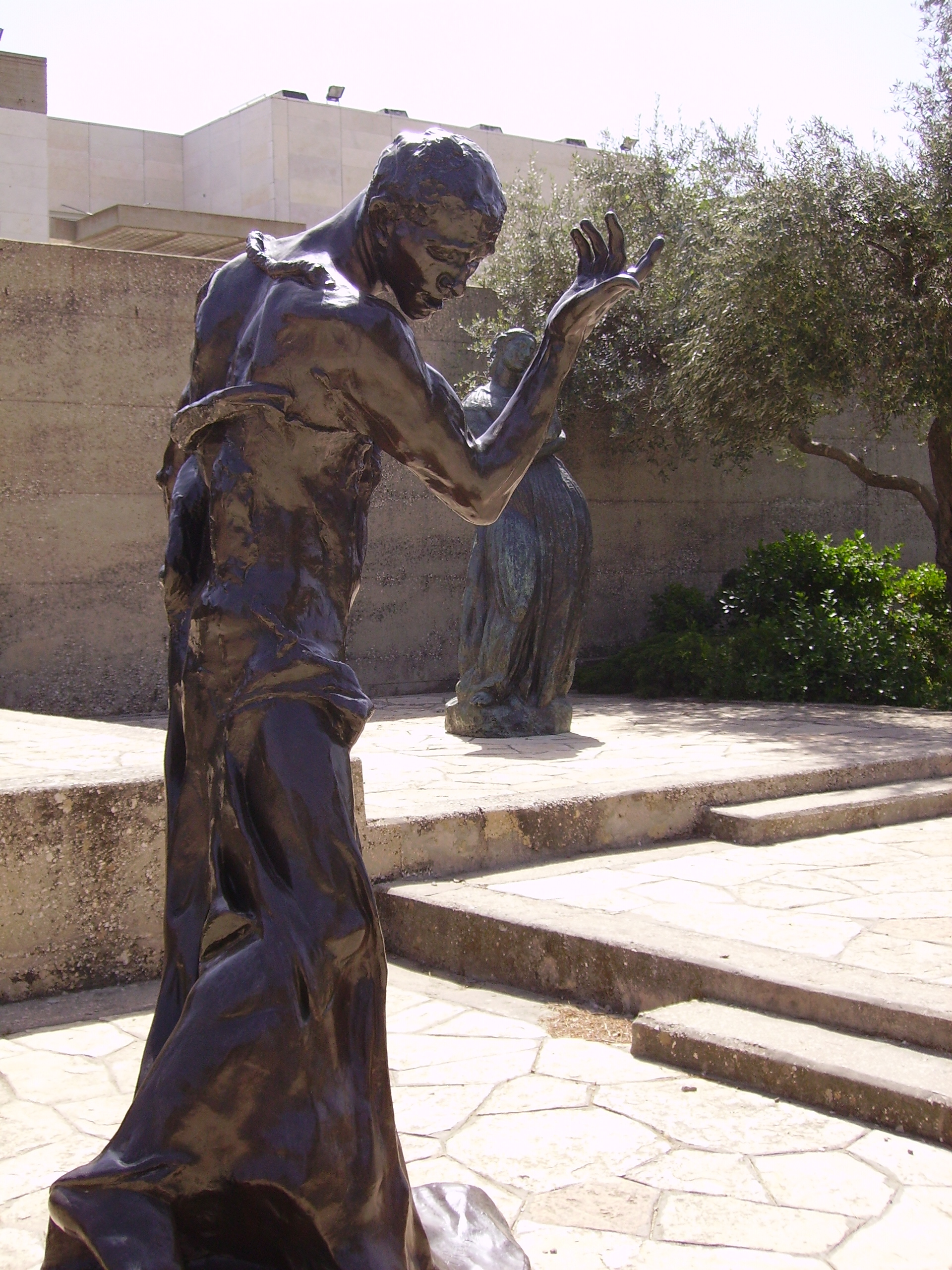
Pierre de Wissant at the Museum of Israel in Jerusalem

Nude Study in 1885 for Pierre de Wissant Fondation Bemberg

== See also ==
- List of sculptures by Auguste Rodin
