= Shizuoka Prefectural Museum of Art =

- 静岡県立美術館; Shizuoka Kenritsu Bijutsukan
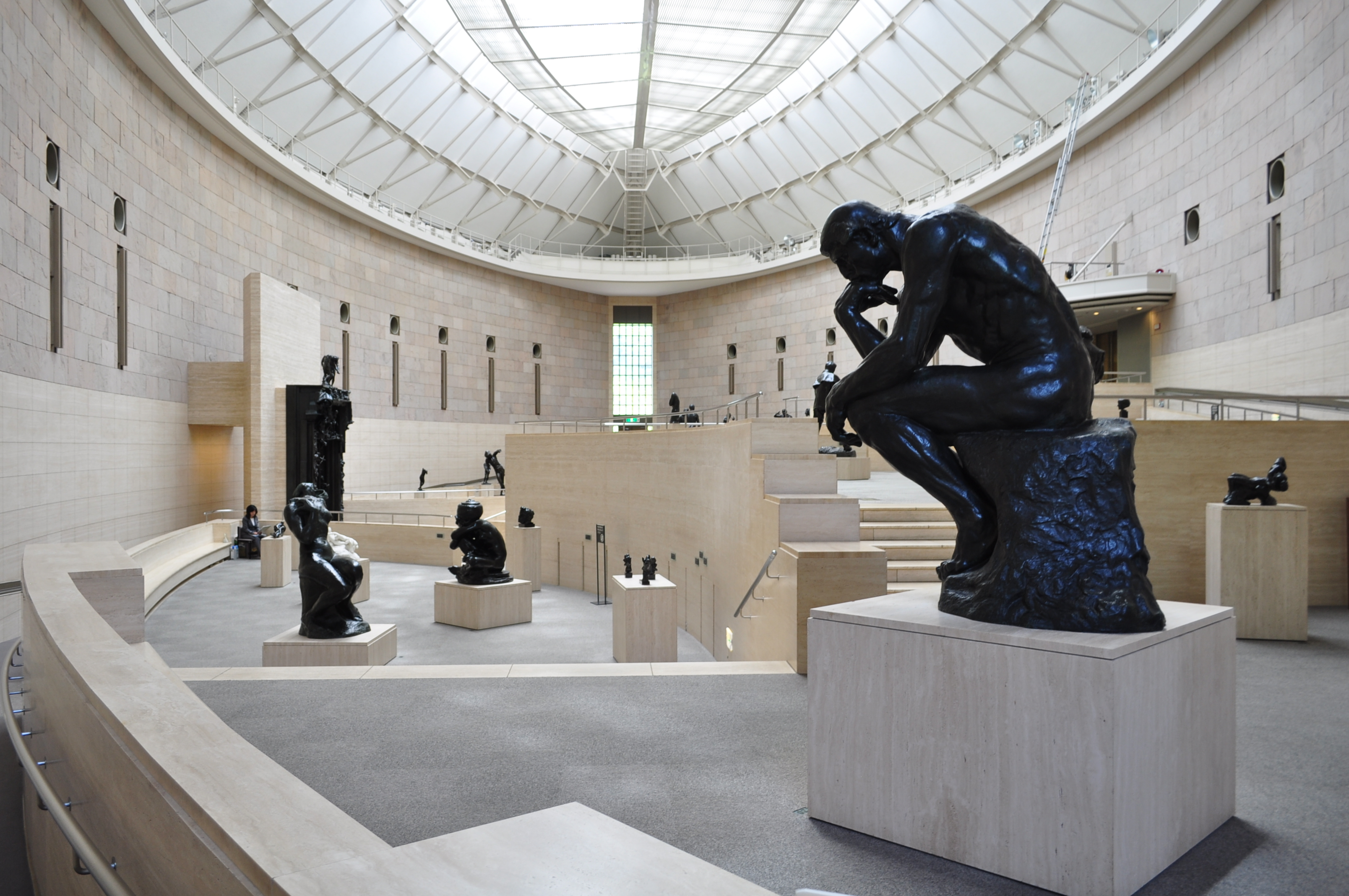
- The Rodin wing of the Shizuoka Prefectural Museum of Art
- Established: April 18, 1986
- Location: Yada 52-2, Suruga Ward, Shizuoka City, Shizuoka Prefecture, Japan, 422-8002
- Coordinates: 34°59′30.4″N 138°26′46.2″E
- Type: Art museum
- Collections: Auguste Rodin
- Collection size: Purchased Works: 1,471 items (2020); Donated works: 1,262 works (2020)
- Director: Naoyuki Kinoshita (since 2017)
- Owner: Shizuoka Prefecture
- Parking: 400 spots on-site
- Website: www.spmoa.shizuoka.shizuoka.jp/en/guide/

The Shizuoka Prefectural Museum of Art (静岡県立美術館, Shizuoka Kenritsu Bijutsukan) is a prefectural museum in Shizuoka City, Japan, created in commemoration of the 100th Anniversary of the inauguration of the Shizuoka Prefectural Assembly.

== Overviews ==
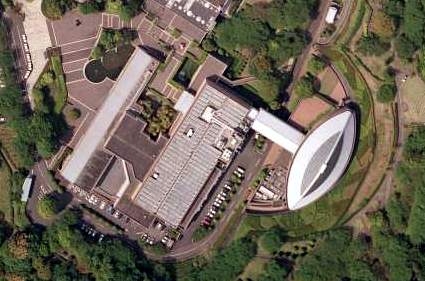
Aerial photograph of Shizuoka Prefectural Museum of Art (May 1, 2009)

Founded in 1986, the 9.240 m^{2} (99,458^{5} ft^{2}) museum is located in the vicinity of the University of Shizuoka's (静岡県立大学) Kusanagi campus, on a verdant hill on the northern side of the picturesque Nihondaira Plateau in the southern part of the city.

A promenade in the midst of a Sculpture Garden creates a pleasurable journey for visitors to the wooded site and leads right up to the main museum entrance. Twelve sculptures grace this main alleyway. Monumental work by American artists George Rickey, James Rosati and Tony Smith is complemented by work from Japanese sculptors such as Makio Yamaguchi (山口牧生), Tadayoshi Sato (佐藤忠良), Kiyosumi Onishi (大西清澄), Kubei Shimizu (清水九兵衛), Takashi Sugimura (杉村孝), Goro Kakei (掛井五郎), Hisao Suzuki (鈴木久雄), Yoshitatsu Yanagihara (柳原義達) and Yasutake Funakoshi (舟越保武).

== Collection of the Main Building ==
The Main Building houses a.o. a Gallery of Prefecture Residents with work from local Japanese artists, mostly of lesser interest to an international public.

The bulk of the collection on show is constituted mostly of Japanese and some Western works of art, primarily focused on landscape painting.^{,} The museum also has a fine collection of Japanese drawings and prints, as well as a number of prints by Giovanni Battista Piranesi, Marco Ricci, etc., and watercolours by Joseph Mallord William Turner and John Robert Cozens.

=== European Painting ===
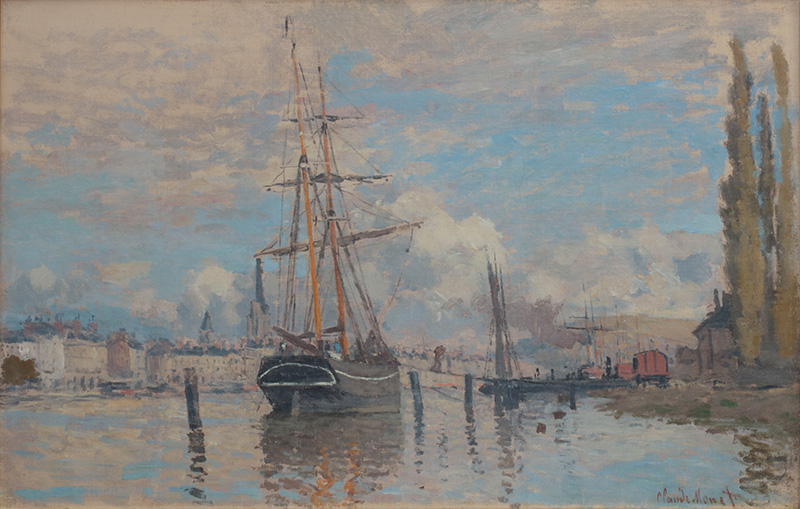
La Seine à Rouen (1872) by Monet (W 218)

XVII^{th}-C. and XVIII^{th}-C landscape paintings by Hubert Robert, Claude Lorrain, Gaspard Dughet, Claude-Joseph Vernet and Jean-Joseph-Xavier Bidauld constitute the earliest examples of the French School.

French early XIX^{th}-C painting is represented by Gustave Courbet, Pierre Étienne Théodore Rousseau, Achille-Etna Michallon, and Alexandre-Hyacinthe Dunouy. Paintings by French Impressionists Claude Monet and Camille Pissarro, by Post-Impressionists Paul Cézanne, Paul Signac and Paul Gauguin, and by fauvist Maurice de Vlaminck complement the late XIX^{th}-C collection.

The English masters John Constable and Samuel Palmer typify the early XIX^{th}-C school of British landscape painting.

The Dutch school shows a number of XVII^{th}-C works by masters such as Jakob van Ruysdael, Rembrandt Van Rijn, Aert van der Neer, Jan van Goyen and Adriaen van Ostade.

=== Japanese Painting ===
(Work in Progress) ^{[to be expanded]}

The 400-year history of the Kanō school is one of the main focuses of the museum.

Many depictions of Mount Fuji and the Tōkaidō landscape by various Japanese painters can be viewed in the collection as is work by painters associated with the Tokugawa shogunate.

Most notable Japanese paintings are works by Taikan Yokoyama (横山 大観), a twentieth century painter, and Jakuchū Itō (伊藤 若冲), an eighteenth century (mid-Edo-period) master, who made a famous set of painted folding screens, called the Juka chōjū-zu byōbu (樹花鳥獣図屏風, Birds and Animals in the Flower Garden), using a rare technique he invented, masume gaki (枡目描き).

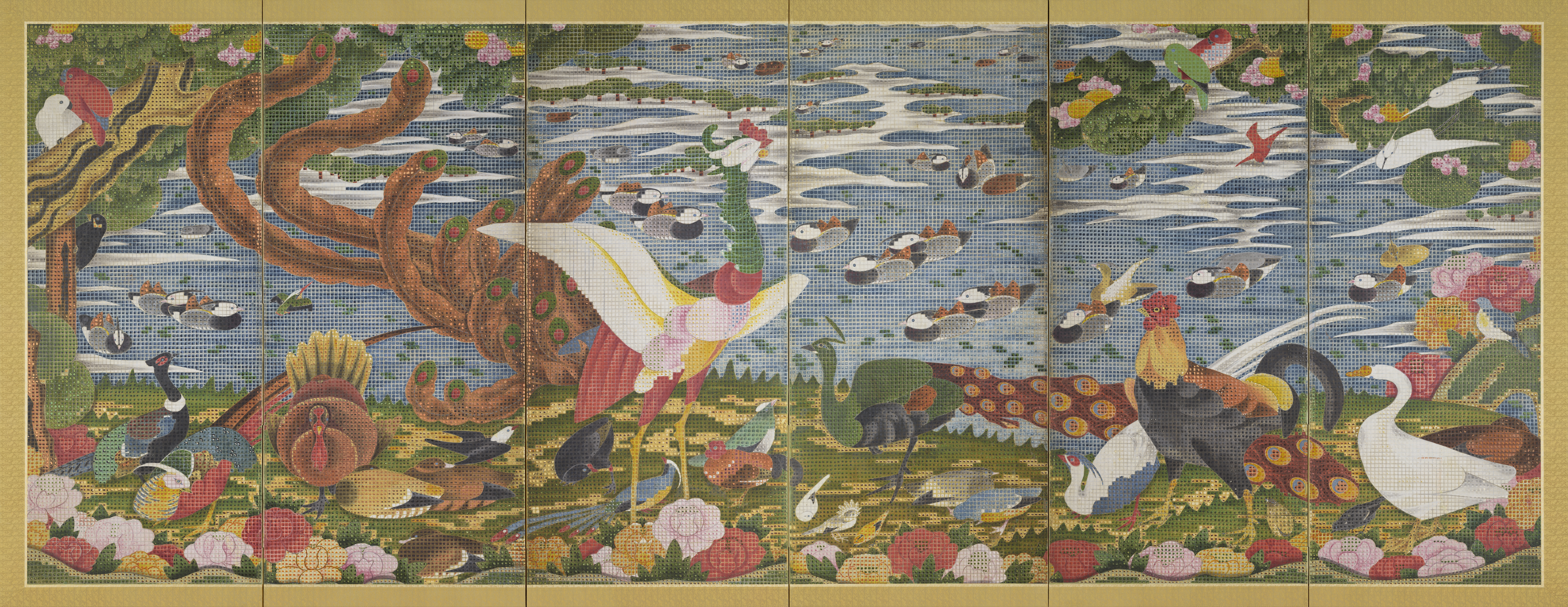
Juka Choju-zu Byobu (樹花鳥獣図屏風, Birds and Animals in the Flower Garden (left panel))

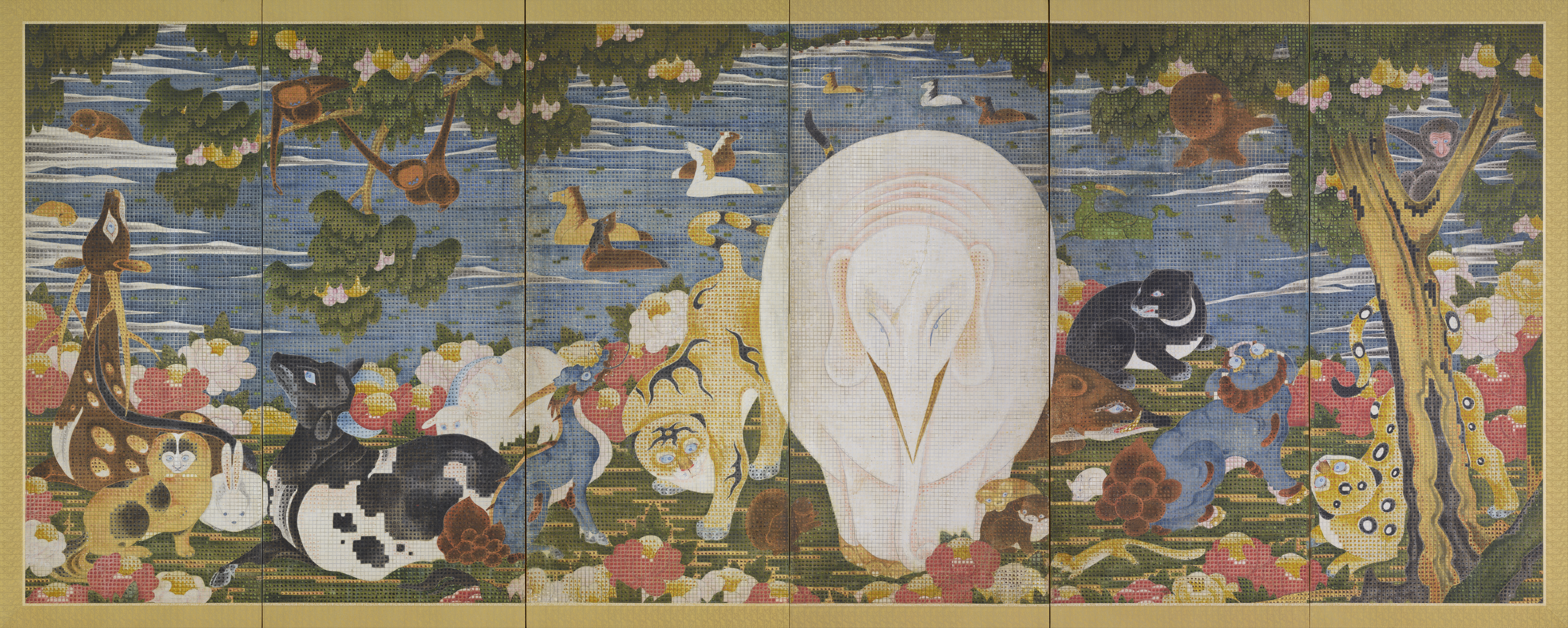
Juka Choju-zu Byobu (樹花鳥獣図屏風, Birds and Animals in the Flower Garden (right panel))

=== Contemporary art ===
The museum has a number of sculptural works by 1960s artists from a group called GEN-SHOKU, i.e. Phantom Touch (幻触, Shizuoka Kenritsu Bijutsukan), a local avant-garde city-based movement of the XXth century: Issei Koike (小池一誠), Shoji Iida (飯田昭二), Yoshinori Suzuki (鈴木慶則), Morichi Maeda (前田守一) and Katsuji Niwa (丹羽勝次). Some of these artists became involved with later members of the Mono-ha movement.^{,}

== Sculpture Collection in the new wing ==
The main attraction of this museum is its 3.025 m^{2} (32,560 ft^{2}) domed Rodin Wing (designed by the Shizuoka office of Nissoken Architects and Engineers, Tokyo) which opened in March 1994^{,} and houses a collection of thirty-two sculptures by the French artist Auguste Rodin, including certified versions of The Thinker, The Gates of Hell, The Burghers of Calais, ... and some Monuments to artists, such as James McNeill Whistler, Claude Lorrain, Jules Bastien-Lepage, Charles Baudelaire or Honoré de Balzac.

In the Bridge Gallery, connecting the Main Building to the Rodin Wing, the spectator can experience a total of 51 sculptures, from periods before and after Rodin, by renowned sculptors such as: Jean-Baptiste Carpeaux, Antoine-Louis Barye, Jules Dalou, Emmanuel Frémiet, Medardo Rosso, Constantin Brancusi, Albert-Ernest Carrier-Belleuse, Jacques Lipchitz, Aristide Maillol, Antoine Bourdelle, Alexander Archipenko, Alberto Giacometti, Wilhelm Lehmbruck, Henry Moore, Paul Gauguin, Ernst Barlach and Camille Claudel, Rodin's muse and one-time lover.

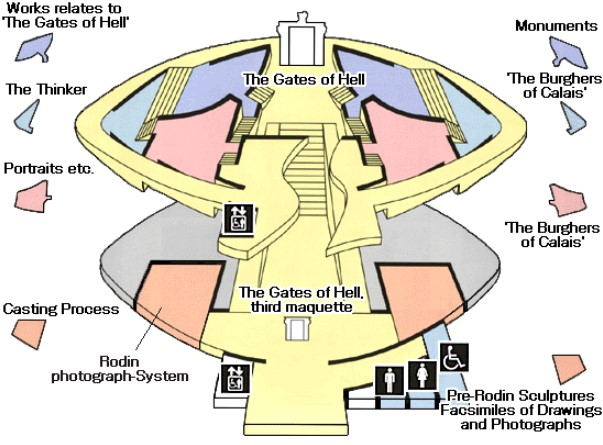
Rodin Wing

== Works in the collection ==
=== Works in the Main Building ===
(Work in Progress) ^{[to be expanded]}

=== Works in the Rodin Wing ===
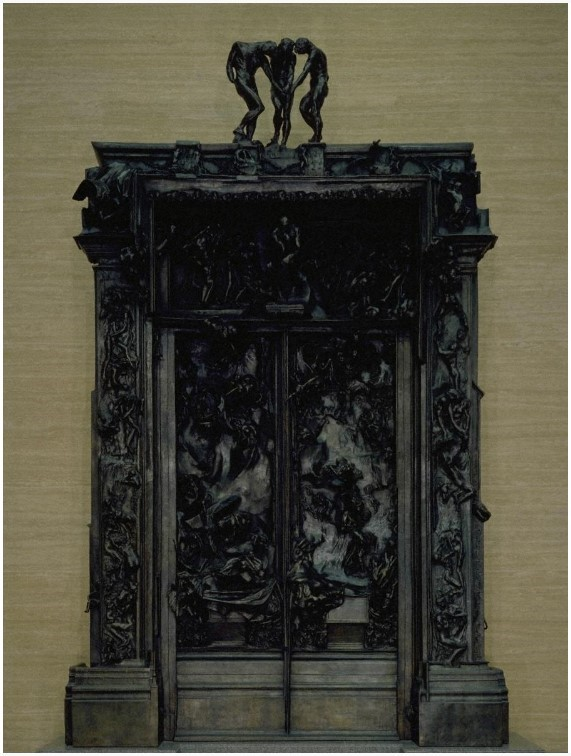
"The Gates of Hell" by Auguste Rodin – FONDERIE DE COUBERTIN – Musée Rodin 1992, N° 6/8

The Gates of Hell and related works by Rodin
Title	Date	Material	Dimensions (cm)	Cast
The Gates of Hell 1880–1917	1880–1917	Bronze	620*390*100	No 6/8, 1992
The Gates of Hell, third maquette	1880–81	Bronze	110*73*31	No III./IV., 1992
The Thinker	1880	Bronze	183*130*110	1902–1904
The Caryatid with a Vase	ca.1880–88	Bronze	123.7*80.5*81.3	No II./IV., 1986
Cybele	1890	Bronze	161*78.8*86.5	No I./III., 1988
Head of the Large Shade		Bronze	38*28*32	NoII./IV., 1988
Torso of the Large Shade		Bronze	100.5*73*49	No II./IV., 1991
Paolo and Francesca	1880's	Bronze	29.8*59.1*27	No 8/8, 1983
Bacchanal	ca.1900–10	Bronze	41*48.8*41.8	No 1/8, 1989
Torso of the Centauresse and a Despairing Adolescent		Bronze	31.2*24.5*13.1	No II./IV., 1991
Torso of the Centauresse and a Female Torso		Bronze	21.5*15.1*12.4	No II./IV., 1991
Torso of the Centauresse and Study for Iris		Bronze	22.9*11.3*13.2	No II./IV., 1991
Fugit Amor	ca.1887	Marble	55*87.6*56	

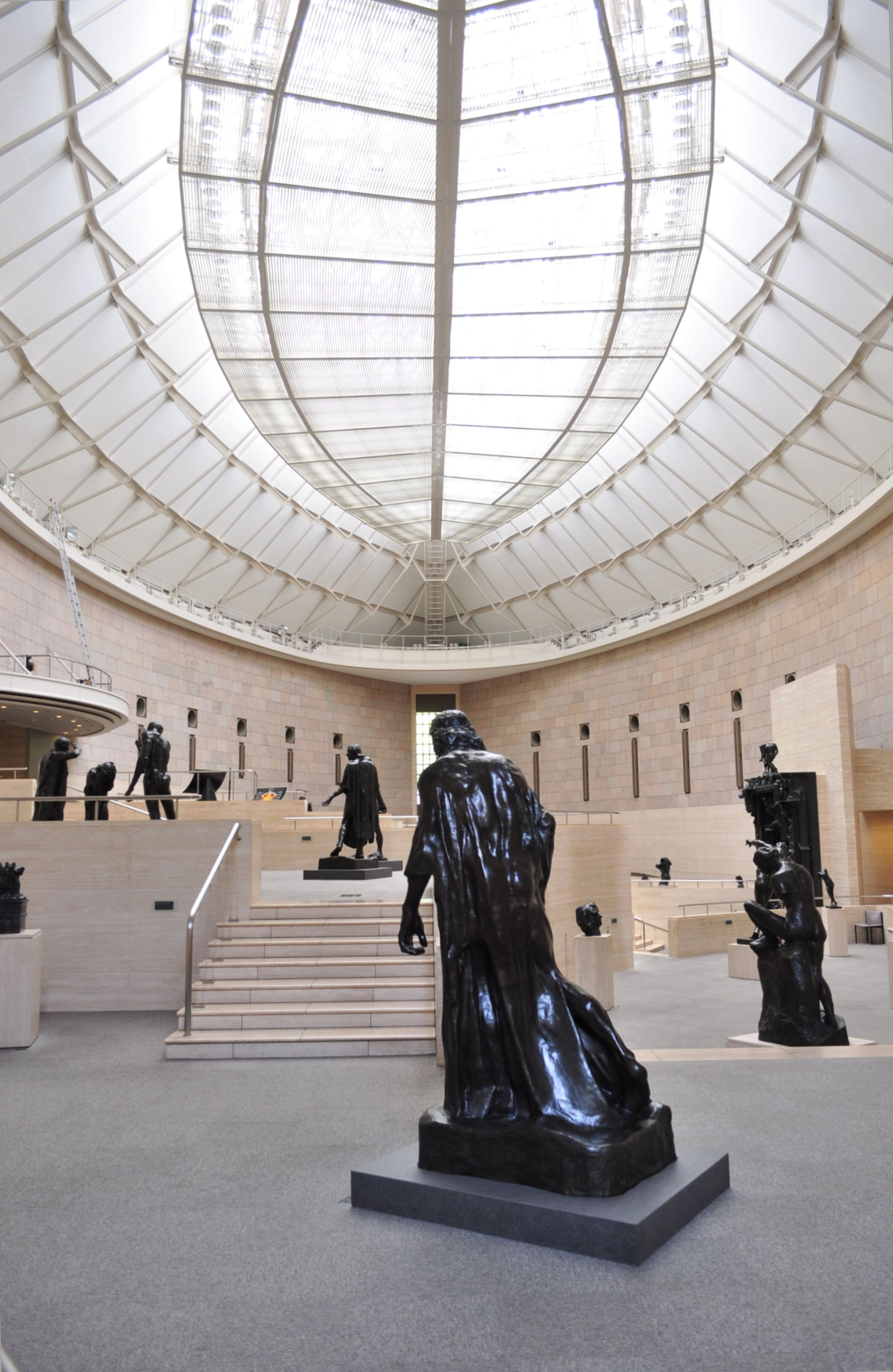
The Burghers of Calais, Rodin Wing, Shizuoka Prefectural Museum of Art

The Burghers of Calais and related works by Rodin
Title	Date	Material	Dimensions (cm)	Cast
The Burghers of Calais, Eustache de Saint-Pierre	ca.1886–87	Bronze	214*77.5*114.5	No IV./IV., 1988
The Burghers of Calais, Jean d'Aire	ca.1886–87	Bronze	204.5*67*63	No IV./IV., 1988
The Burghers of Calais, Pierre de Wissant	ca.1886–87	Bronze	196*113*95.5	No IV./IV., 1986
The Burghers of Calais, Jean de Fiennes	ca.1887–89	Bronze	206.5*119*85	No II./IV., 1984
The Burghers of Calais, Jacques de Wissant	ca.1887–89	Bronze	210*135*76	No III./IV., 1988
The Burghers of Calais, Andrieu d'Andres	ca.1887–89	Bronze	198*127*87.5	No II./IV., 1988
The Burghers of Calais, first maquette	1884	Bronze	60*38*31	No 8/8, 1987

Some Monuments and other works by Rodin
Title	Date	Material	Dimensions (cm)	Cast
Charles Baudelaire, head	ca.1892–98	Bronze	25.5*20.5*22.5	N1, c. 1892 – 1898
Young Girl with Roses in her Hair	ca.1870–75	Terracotta	39*19.5*17.5	
Bastien-Lepage	1887–89	Bronze	175*92*82	No III./IV., 1991
Claude Lorrain	1889	Bronze	212*121*103	No II./IV., 1990
Naked Balzac	ca.1896	Bronze	91*38.5*36	No II./IV., 1987
Colossal Head of Balzac	1897	Bronze	49*49.5*38	No I./I., 1982
Torso of the Spirit of Eternal Repose aka Funerary Spirit		Bronze	86*39*29	No 4, 1981
The Spirit of Eternal Repose	ca.1899	Bronze	193*100*91	No III./IV., 1990
The Muse of Whistler	ca.1903–08	Bronze	236*108*80	No III./IV., 1989
Grand Mask of Hanako	after 1907	Bronze	55*39*29	No 3, 1973
Torso of a Seated Woman called the Victoria and Albert Museum		Bronze	63*38*20	No I./IV., 1982
Study for "La France" or Saint George	1904	Bronze	50*43*31	No III./III., 1985

The 19th Century French Sculpture Before Rodin (At the Rodin Wing)
Sculptor	Title	Date	Material	Dimensions (cm)	Cast
Emmanuel FREMIET (1824–1910)	Serpent Charmer	1883	Bronze	45*15*14	
Antoine-Louis BARYE (1795–1875)	Lion Crushing a Serpent	1838	Bronze	21.3*32*18.5	BARYE 1838
Jean-Baptiste CARPEAUX (1827–1875)	Neapolitan Fisherboy	1857	Bronze	89.5*45*54.5	
Jean-Baptiste CARPEAUX (1827–1875)	Mater Dolorosa	1869–70	Terracotta	73.5*60*36.5	
Albert-Ernest CARRIER-BELLEUSE (1824–1887)	Satyr Carrying off a Nymph	after 1868	Terracotta	56.6, 28 (diameter of base)	
Aimé-Jules DALOU (1838–1902)	Nursing Parisienne	1874	Bronze	47.5*23*36.2	Dalou 1874

=== Works in the Bridge Gallery ===
Development of Post-Rodin Sculpture
Sculptor	Title	Date	Material	Dimensions (cm)	Cast
Paul GAUGUIN (1848–1903)	Oviri	ca.1894–95	Coloured plaster	74.5*26*32.5	
Medardo ROSSO (1858–1928)	A Patient at Hospital	1889	Bronze	21*18*25.5	
Émile-Antoine BOURDELLE (1861–1929)	Head of Apollo	1909	Bronze	67*26.5*32	
Émile-Antoine BOURDELLE (1861–1929)	Bust of Rodin	1909	Bronze	56*33*35	
Aristide MAILLOL (1861–1944)	Torso of Ile de France	1921	Bronze	120*32*58	(M) 4/6
Camile CLAUDEL (1864–1943)	Wave (reproduction)	1897–98	Bronze	50*56*60	1/8
Constantin BRANCUSI (1876–1957)	Mademoiselle Pogany II	1925	Polished bronze	57*18*26	
Wilhelm LEHMBRUCK (1881–1919)	Small Torso of a Woman	1911	Cement with brown patina	70.5*24.5*17.5	
Ernst BARLACH (1870–1938)	Reading Monks III	1932	Bronze	58*44.5*34.5	1932
Jacques LIPCHITZ (1891–1973)	Mother and Child	1913	Bronze	59.5*24*24	1/7
Alexander ARCHIPENKO (1887–1964)	Study for Woman Powdering Herself: Head, Construction with Crossing Planes	1913	Bronze, wooden base	42.5*36*32.5	1913 A
Henry MOORE (1898–1986)	Reclining Figure	1977	Bronze	14*58.5*48	Moore 2/9
Alberto GIACOMETTI (1901–1966)	Reclining Woman	1929	Bronze	26.7*43.1*15.2	2/6, 1929

== Literature ==
- Rodin Wing – Guidebook (spmoa.shizuoka.shizuoka.jp)
