= Félix-Hippolyte Lanoüe =

French painter (1812–1872)

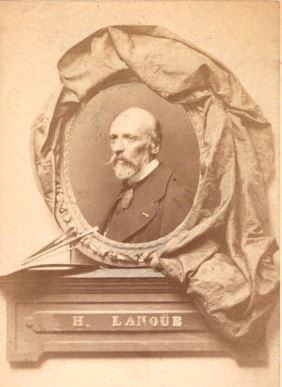
Félix-Hippolyte Lanoüe; postcard photograph

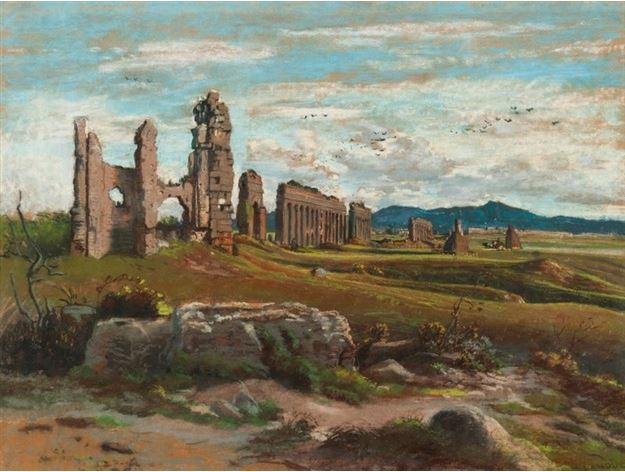
The Aqua Claudia

Félix-Hippolyte Lanoüe (14 October 1812 in Versailles – 21 January 1872 in Versailles) was a French landscape painter.

== Biography ==
Around 1830, he became a student of Jean-Victor Bertin, then entered the workshop of Horace Vernet at the École des beaux-arts de Paris. He was given an award for his use of perspective in 1832 and came in at second place for historical landscapes at the Prix de Rome of 1837. Four years later, he received the grand prize in the same category for his depiction of the angel Camael driving Adam and Eve from Paradise with a flaming sword.

His debut at the Salon came in 1833 and he paid his first visit to Rome that same year. His next exhibit at the Salon would not come until 1847, which brought him a medal. In 1849, he produced a series on the Forest of Fontainebleau when that area first became accessible by train.

After his return to France, he toured the valleys of Isère. This was followed by trips to Holland (1850) and Russia (1853), where he painted scenes en plein aire. He was awarded another medal at the Salon in 1861. His stylistic change from Naturalism to Romanticism came at a time when the latter had started to gain favor with the bourgeoisie. Several of his works were bought by the French government. He was named a Chevalier in the Legion of Honor in 1864.
