= Boisselier =

Boisselier is a surname, and may refer to:

- Antoine-Félix Boisselier (1790–1857), French painter
- Brigitte Boisselier (born 1956), head of Clonaid, the "scientific wing" of the Raëlians
- Jean Boisselier (1912–1996), French archaeologist and art historian specialised in Khmer art
- Julien Boisselier (born 1970), French actor
