= Antoine-Félix Boisselier =

French painter (1790–1857)

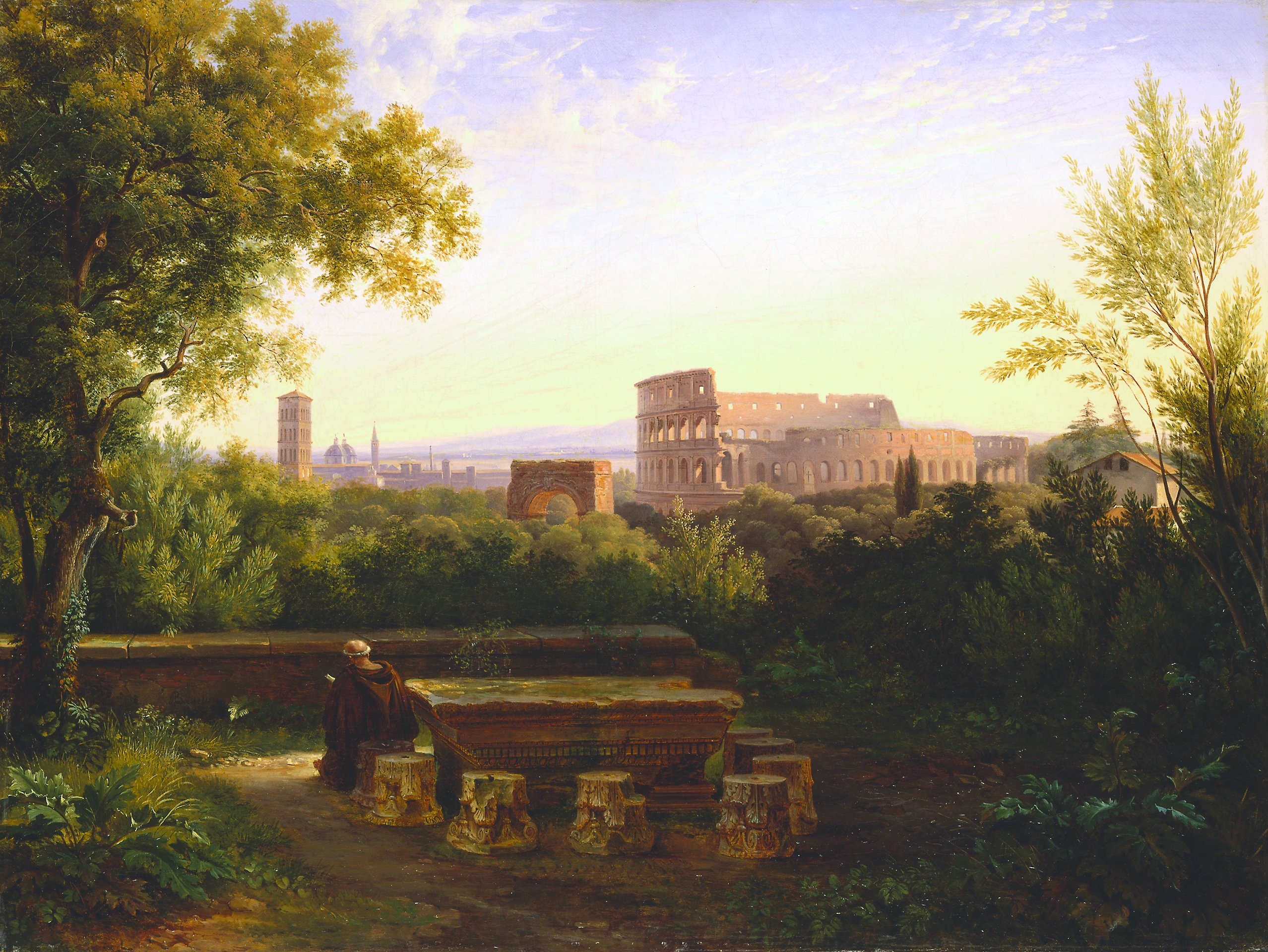
View of the Colosseum from the Orti Farnesiani

Antoine-Félix Boisselier (22 May 1790 – 29 April 1857), known as Boisselier le Jeune to distinguish him from his brother Félix Boisselier, was a French painter.

== Career ==
A native of Paris, he was of the same generation as Camille Corot and Achille Etna Michallon. He studied with his brother and Jean-Victor Bertin, and is known to have visited Italy around 1811, in which year he painted two oil studies of that country. He first entered the Salon in 1812, and exhibited frequently thereafter; at the Salon of 1824, he won a second-class medal. In 1827, he entered the first Prix de Rome competition for historical landscape. He placed second behind Michalllon, but nevertheless appears to have traveled to Italy soon thereafter. Many of his Salon entries, and many images he submitted to provincial salons, were views of Italian sites and historical landscapes. Later in his career he painted in the Auvergne region, as well as the Dauphiné and Provence. Boisselier taught drawing at the École spéciale militaire de Saint-Cyr, and maintained a popular studio; he died in Versailles in 1857.

The record price for one of his artworks at auction is US$163,932 for Vue d'un monastère bénédictin à Subiaco, sold in 2016.
