= Jean-Victor Bertin =

French painter (1767–1842)

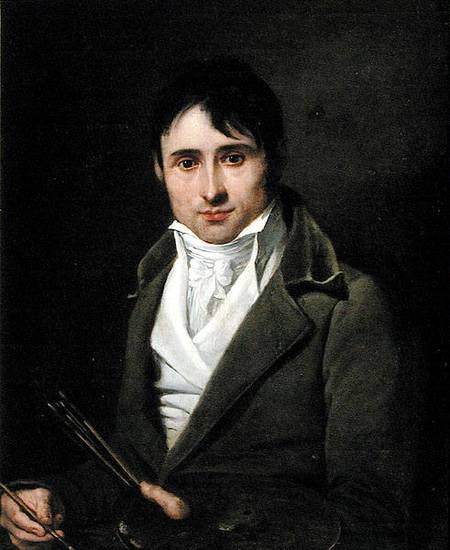
Portrait of Bertin by Robert Lefèvre, now at the Musée Marmottan Monet

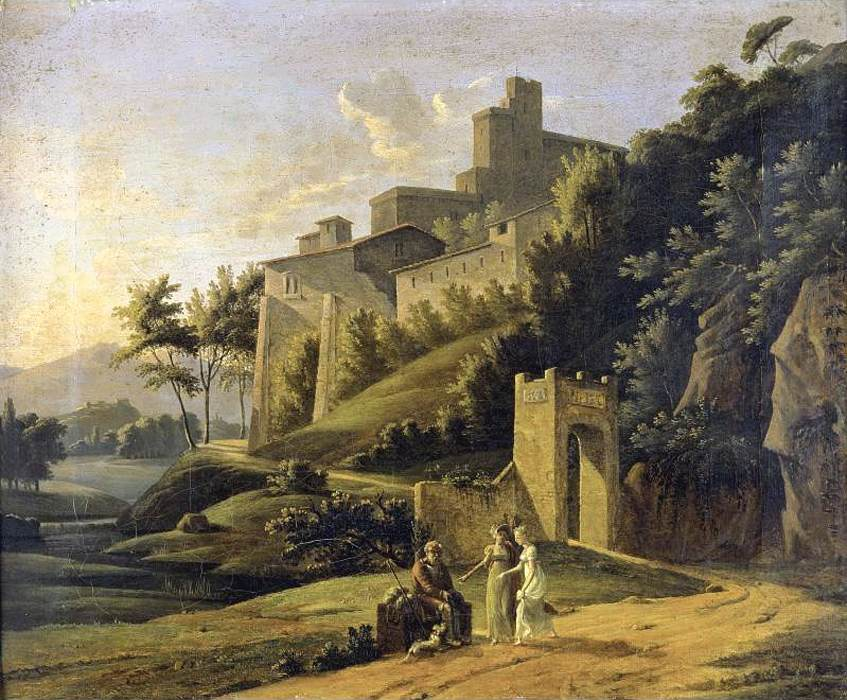
Landscape with a Fortress

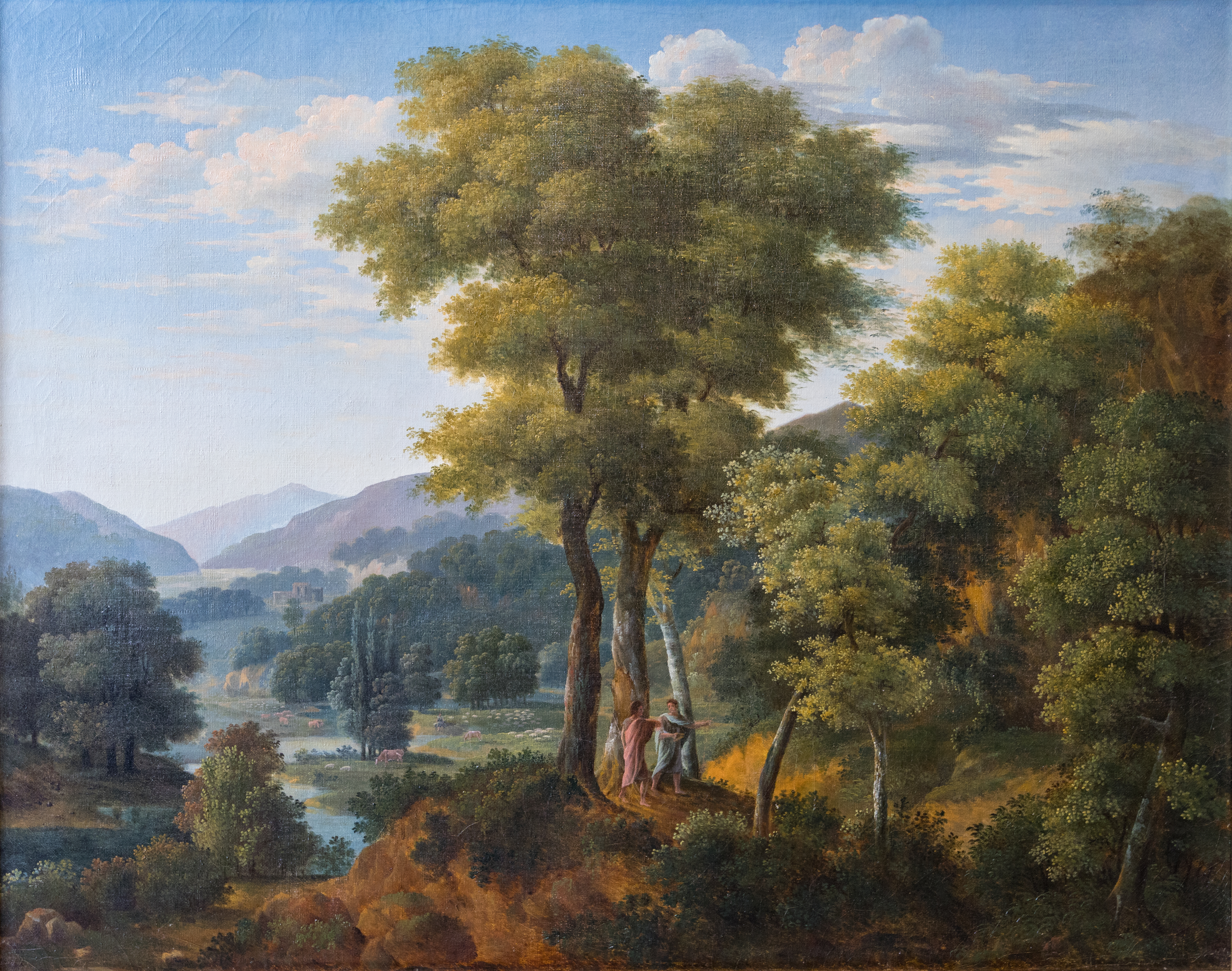
Landscape. In the morning, Quesnel-Morinière Museum in Coutances

Jean-Victor Bertin (20 March 1767 – 11 June 1842) was a French painter of historical landscapes, inspired by Italy and known for the minute detail of his classical style.

== Life ==
The son of a master wig-maker, Bertin was born in Paris. He became a pupil of the landscape painter Pierre-Henri de Valenciennes and entered the Académie royale de peinture et de sculpture in 1785 as a pupil of Gabriel-François Doyen. Between 1785 and 1793 he participated in several 'concours d'émulation' competitions and from 1793 until his death regularly exhibited at the Paris Salon.

He won a 'prix d'encouragement' in 1799 and his work was recognised in 1808 by a gold medal, first class, with a value of 250 francs. He was granted the Légion d'honneur on 21 August 1822. His old age was marked by financial problems. He died on 11 June 1842 in Paris, leaving his widow in deep material distress.

Bertin was the master of Michallon, Cogniet, Boisselier, Corot, Enfantin, and others. Several of his works were commissioned for the palais du Trianon and the palais de Fontainebleau between 1811 and 1817. Prestigious amateurs such as the duc de Berry and the banker Jacques Laffitte appreciated Bertin's talents and from 1833 onwards the French state, particularly the Interior Ministry, regularly bought his works to enrich museums in the provinces.

== Selected works ==
Amongst his principal works may be cited:

- The Festival of Pan.
- The Offering to Venus.
- Cicero's Return from Exile.
- The Flight of Angelica.
- The Festival of Bacchus.
- Arrival of Napoleon at Ettlingen.

Many of his works will be found in the galleries at Versailles, and in other public collections. In the Louvre there is a 'View of the Island of Phoenos with the Temple of Minerva.'
