= Pierre-Athanase Chauvin =

French painter

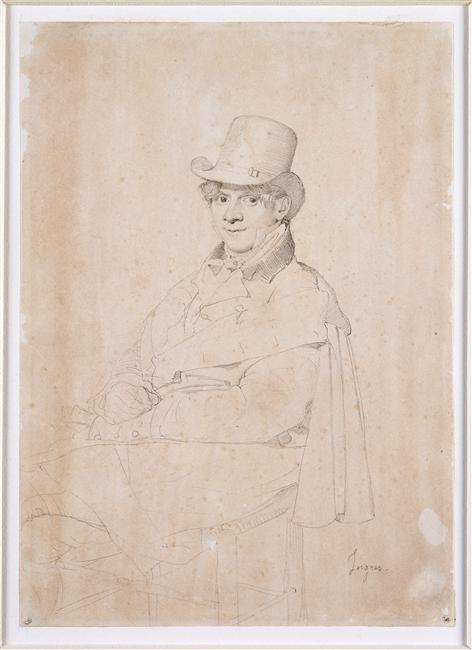
- Pierre-Athanase Chauvin by Jean Auguste Dominique Ingres, 1814
- Born: 9 June 1774; Paris, France
- Died: 29 October 1832; Rome, Papal States
- Occupation: Painter

Pierre Athanase Chauvin (9 June 1774 – 29 October 1832) was a French painter active in Italy.

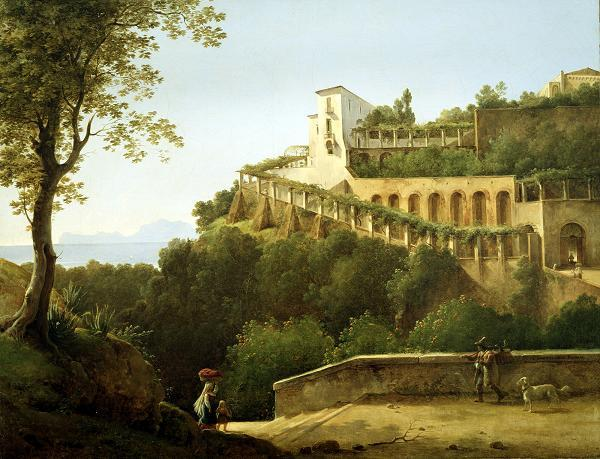
A Convent Near Naples with a View of Capri, 1816, Dallas Museum of Art

Chauvin was a student of the landscape painter Pierre-Henri de Valenciennes. He began his career at the Paris Salon in 1793 and won the First Class Medal in 1819 with his painting Charles VIII’s entry into Acquapendente. The painting was commissioned by King Louis XVIII for the Galerie de Diane at the Palace of Fontainebleau.

In 1813, Chauvin settled in Rome and became a member of the Accademia di San Luca. Chauvin's views of Italy show the influence of Jean Auguste Dominique Ingres in their both classical and realist style. Chauvin knew Ingres and the latter made portrait drawings of Chauvin and his wife in 1814.

Chauvin was elected Chevalier of the Legion of Honor in 1828.

His work was represented in the exhibition An Enchanted Country. Italy depicted by Artists from Thomas Jones to Corot at the Centro Internazionale d’Arte e di Cultura di Palazzo Te in Mantua, Italy in 2001.
