= Pierre-Henri de Valenciennes =

French painter (1750–1819)

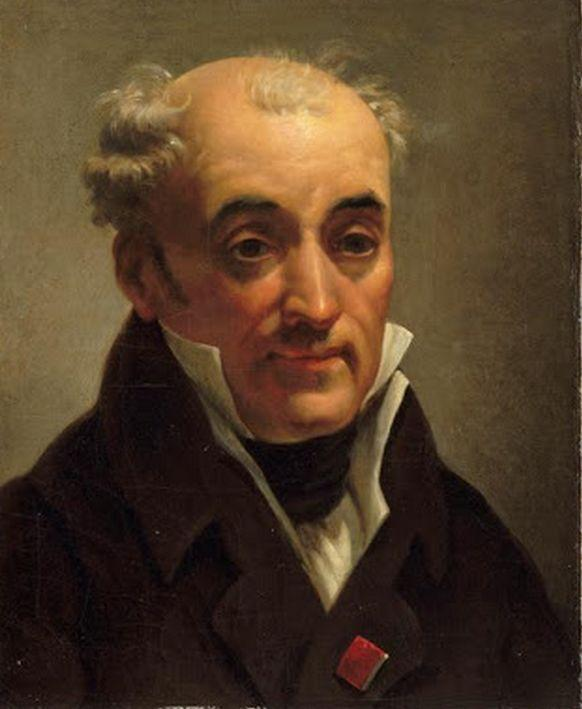
- Pierre-Henri de Valenciennes, Self-portrait (1815)
- Born: Pierre-Henri de Valenciennes; 6 December 1750; Toulouse, France
- Died: 16 February 1819 (68 years); Paris, France
- Known for: Painting
- Movement: Neoclassicism

Pierre-Henri de Valenciennes (6 December 1750 – 16 February 1819) was a French painter. A neoclassicist artist, he was influential in elevating the status of En plein air (open-air painting).

== Life and work ==
Valenciennes studied painting at the Royal Academy of Toulouse from 1770 to 1771, and subsequently in the studio of Gabriel-François Doyen. He first traveled to Italy in 1769, later residing in Rome from 1777 to 1781. Between 1782 and 1784 he journeyed to the Middle East, before finally returning to Paris with numerous sketchbooks, where he established himself and pursued the greater part of his career. He was admitted to the Académie de peinture in 1787. During the French Revolution, he was among the artists housed in the Louvre.

Valenciennes worked in Rome for four years, where he made a number of landscape studies directly from nature, sometimes painting the same set of trees or house at different times of day. He theorized on this idea in his 1800 treatise Reflections and Advice to a Student on Painting, Particularly on Landscape, developing a concept of a "landscape portrait" in which the artist paints a landscape directly while looking upon it, taking care to capture its particular details.

Painting outside allowed Valenciennes to capture the fleeting changes of a landscape due to light and weather. He was a proponent of artists working outside and painting the same view at multiple times of day. Although he spoke of this as a type of painting mainly of interest to "amateurs", as distinguished from the higher art of the academies, he found it of great interest, and of his own works the surviving landscape portraits have been the most noted by later commentators.

He in particular urged artists to capture the distinctive details of a scene's architecture, dress, agriculture, and so on, in order to give the landscape a sense of belonging to a specific place; in this he probably influenced other French artists active in Italy who took an anthropological approach to painting rural areas and customs, such as Hubert Robert, Pierre-Athanase Chauvin and Achille-Etna Michallon.

Among his students were Jean-Victor Bertin, Achille Etna Michallon, Louis Étienne Watelet, Louis-François Lejeune and the first French panorama painter Pierre Prévost.

Born in the city of Toulouse, he died in Paris and is buried there in the Père Lachaise Cemetery.

== Gallery ==
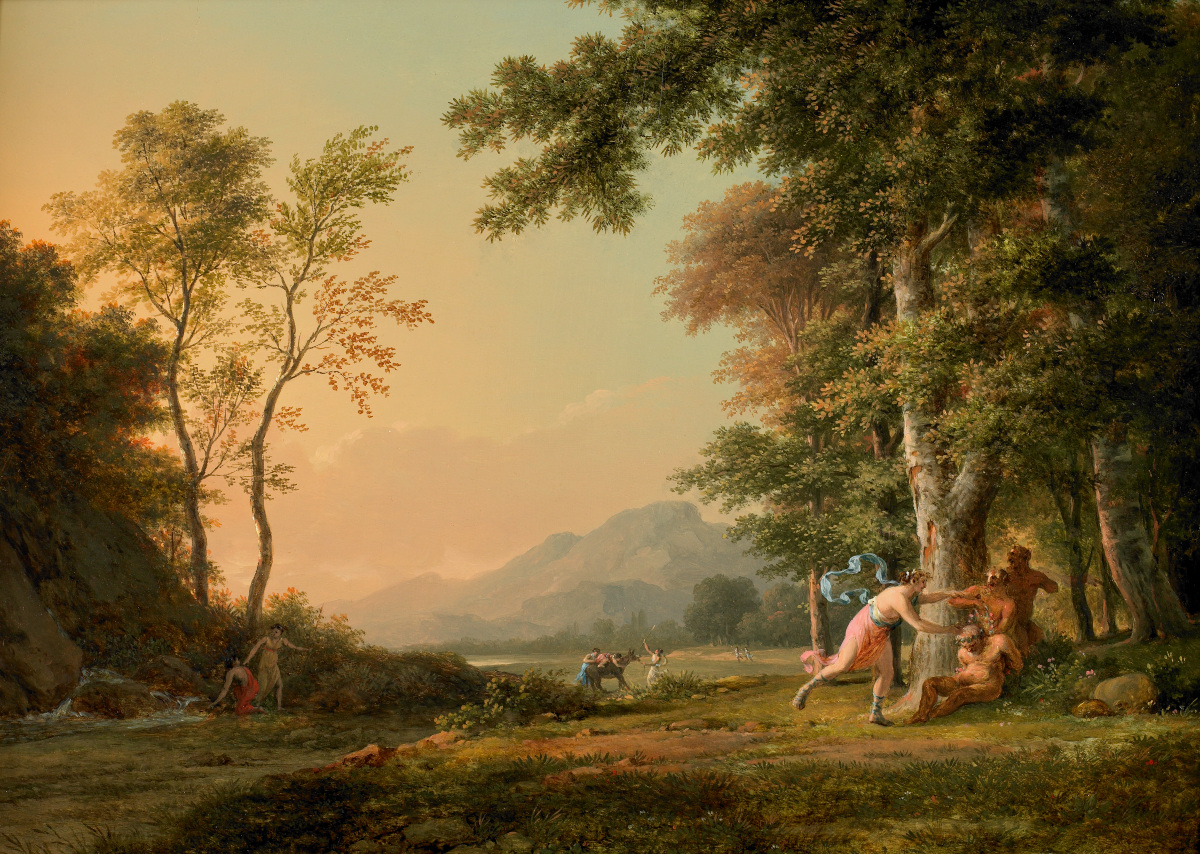
A Wooded Landscape with a Bacchic Scene circa 1810

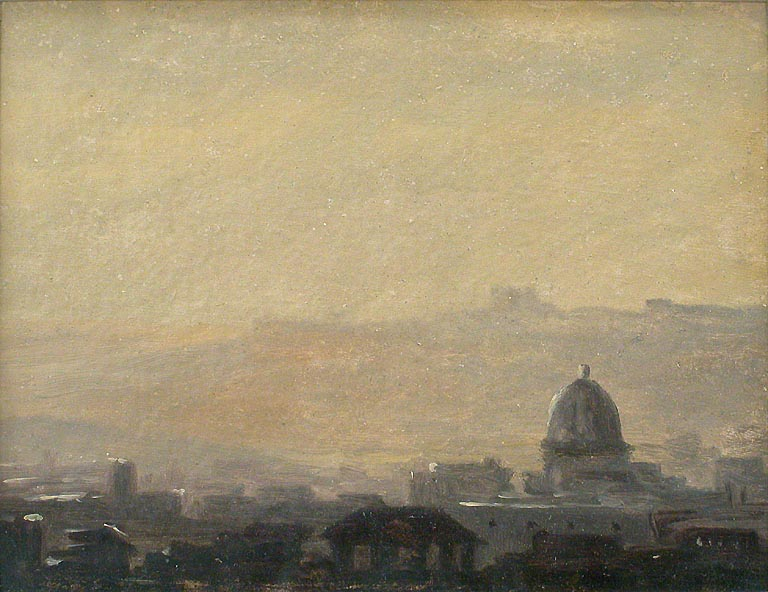
View of the Environs of Rome

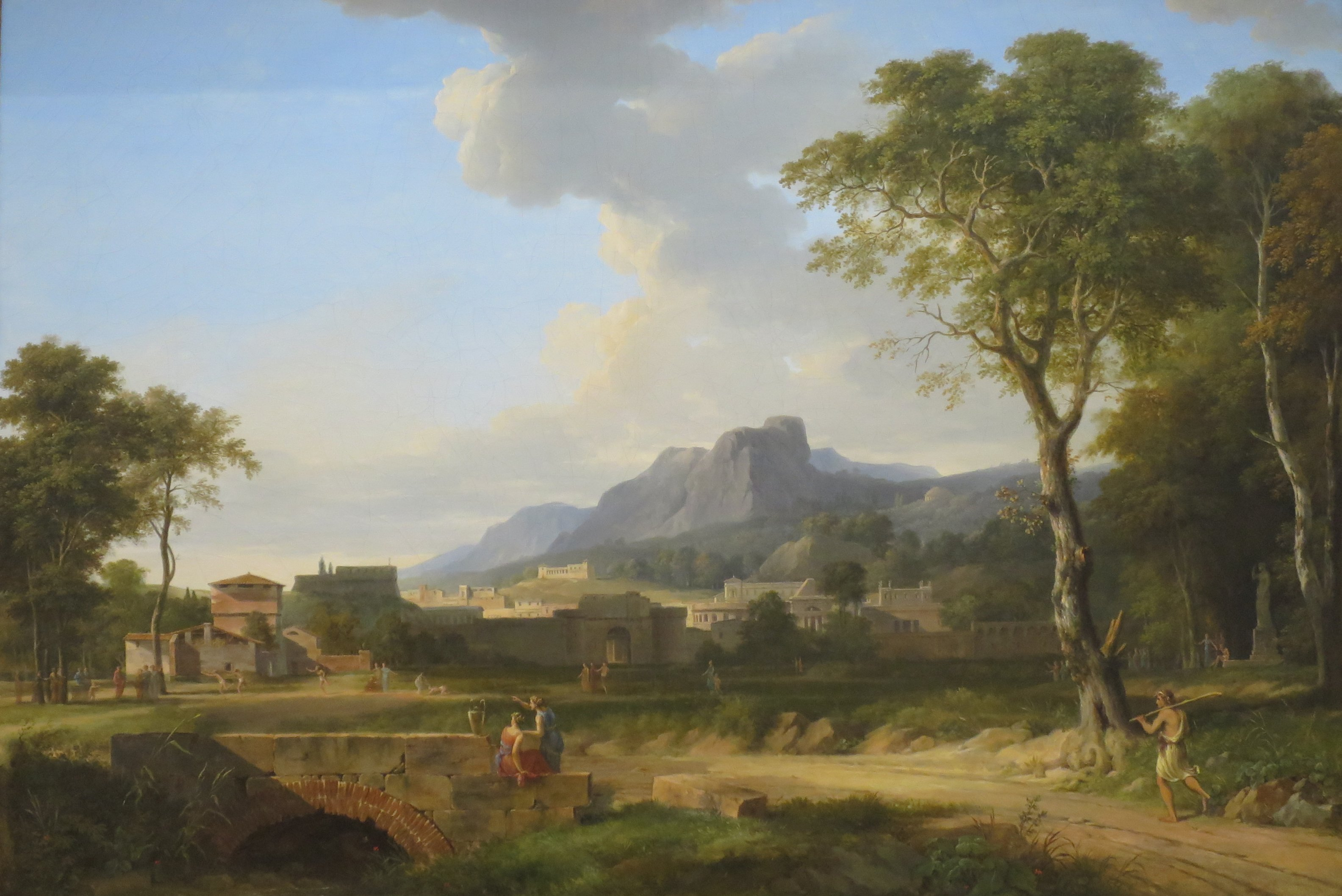
A Capriccio of Rome with the Finish of a Marathon 1788

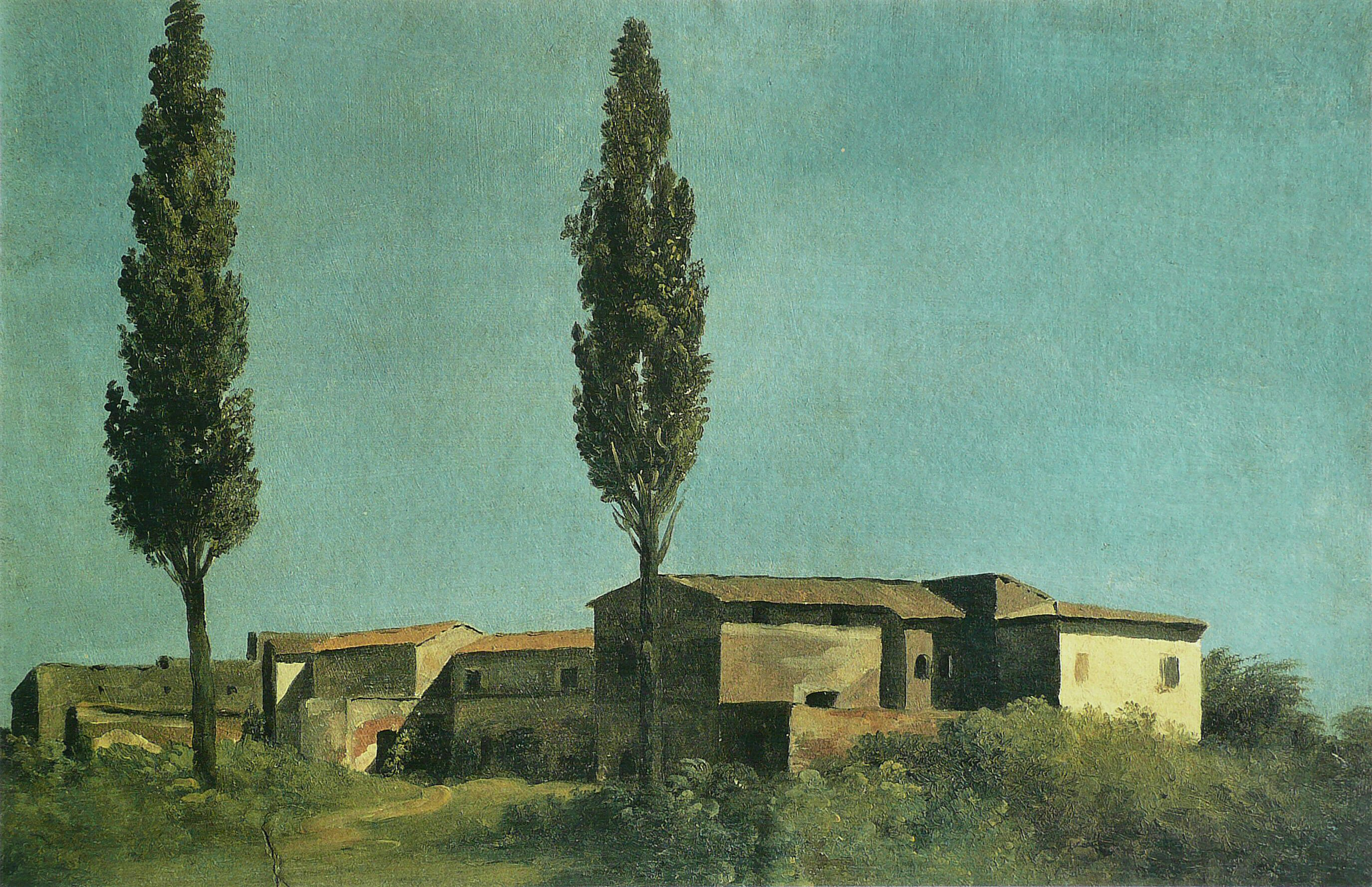
At the villa Farnèse : two poplars

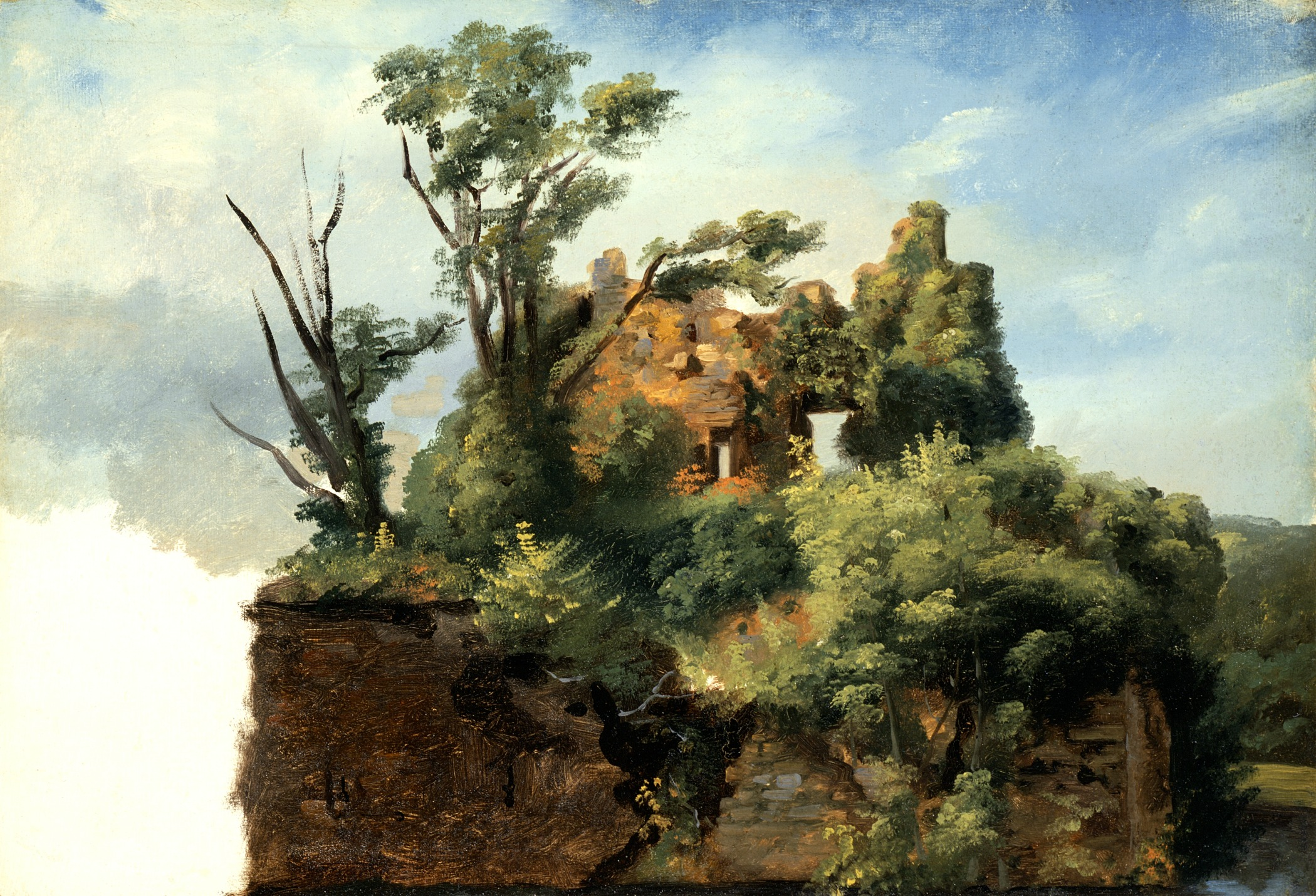
Landscape with Ruins circa 1782-1785

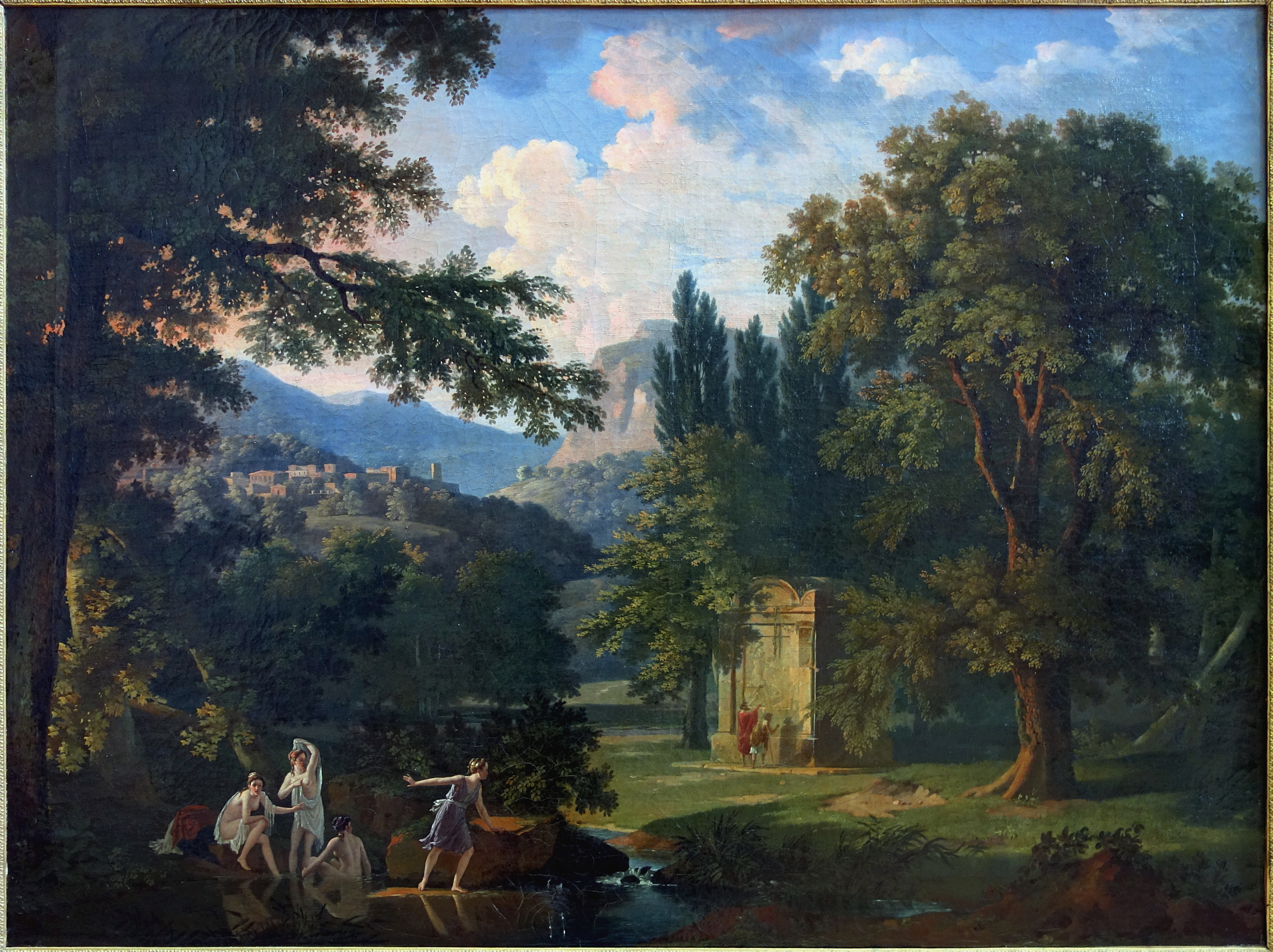
Historical Landscape circa 1800

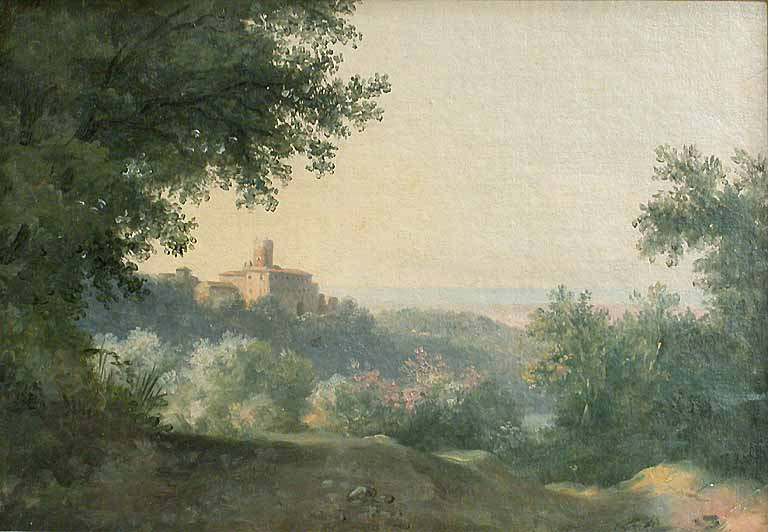
View of the Palace of Nemi. circa 1780
