= Alexandre-Hyacinthe Dunouy =

French painter

- Born: 1757; Paris, Kingdom of France
- Died: 11 November 1841 (aged 84); Jouy-en-Josas
- Known for: Painting
- Movement: Rococo

Alexandre-Hyacinthe Dunouy (1757 – 11 November 1841) was a French painter known for his landscapes.

A native of Paris, Dunouy began his career depicting views of the city and the surrounding region, exhibiting at the Paris Salon for the first time in 1791. He exhibited views of the area around Rome and Naples; he showed regularly until 1833, save for a few absences. He received medals in 1819 and 1827. He is known to have traveled to Italy in 1810 under the patronage of Joachim Murat; there is also evidence that he traveled there in the 1780s. He is also associated with the Auvergne, Savoy, and the area around Lyon.

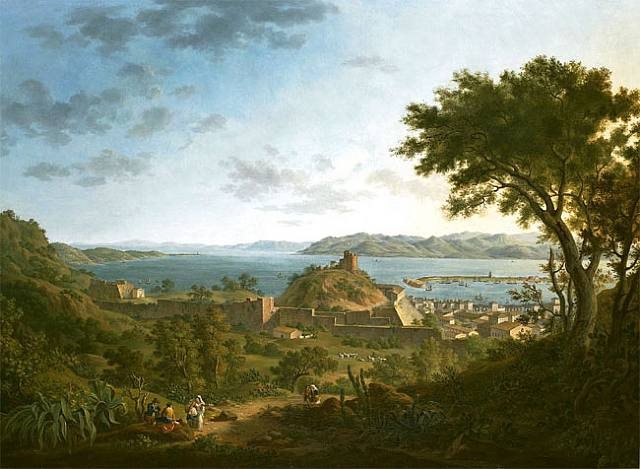
View of Messina

Dunouy's paintings were primarily small and decorative, and he was associated with the artists known as little masters. Their compositions are generally classical, and feature great detail and even lighting. Some of his works include figures added by Jean-Louis Demarne and Nicolas Antoine Taunay.

Dunouy may have taught Achille-Etna Michallon; he died in 1841 in Jouy-en-Josas.
