= Achille Etna Michallon =

French painter (1796–1822)

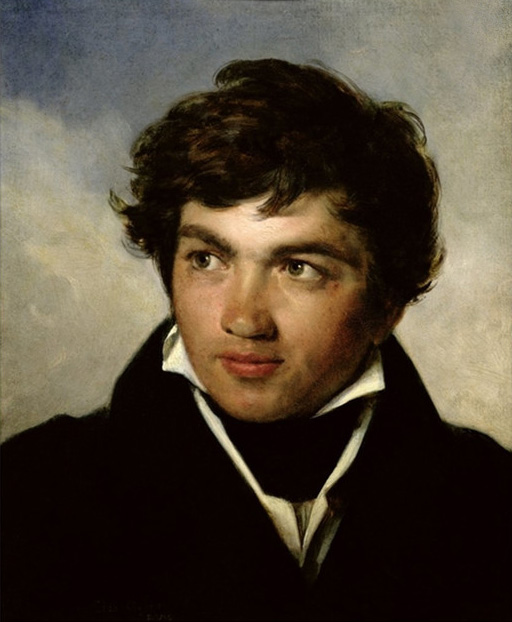
- Achille Etna Michallon, in a portrait by León Coigniet (1818-1819)
- Born: 22 October 1796; Paris, France
- Died: 24 September 1822 (aged 25); Paris, France
- Education: Jacques-Louis David; Alexandre-Hyacinthe Dunouy; Pierre-Henri de Valenciennes
- Known for: Painting

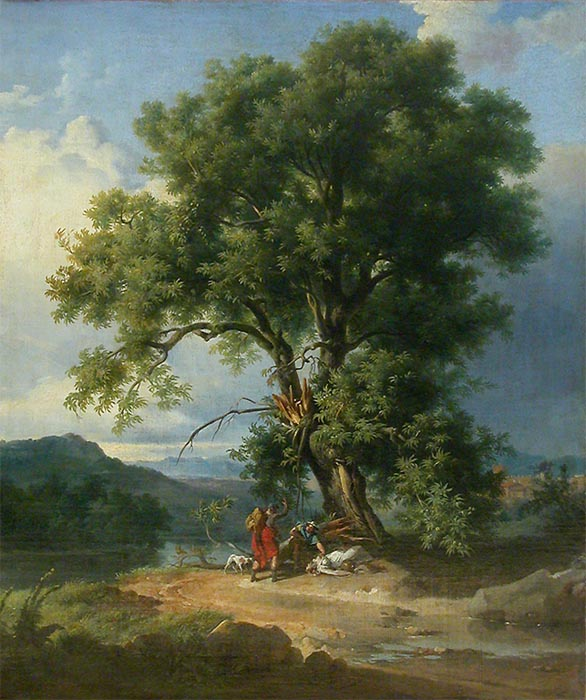
La femme foudroyée, Louvre

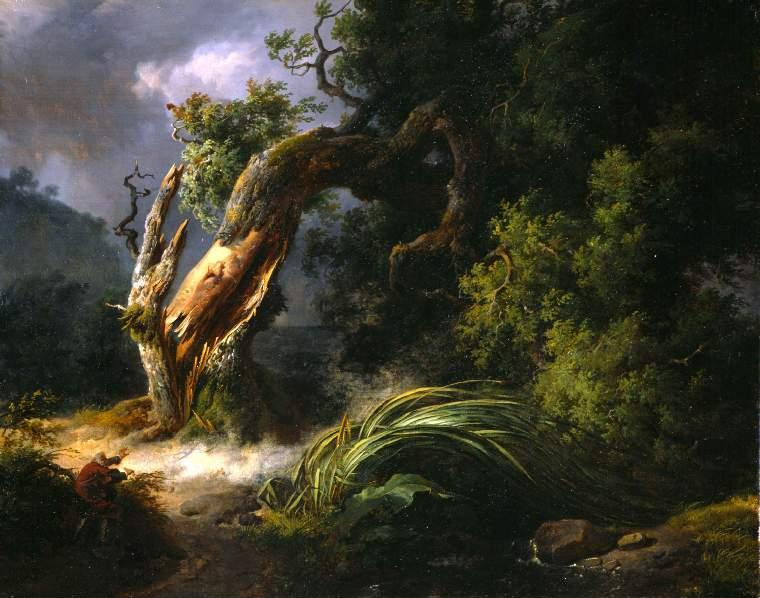
The Oak and the Reed (Fitzwilliam Museum)

Achille Etna Michallon (22 October 1796 – 24 September 1822) was a French painter.

Michallon was the son of the sculptor Claude Michallon and nephew of the sculptor Guillaume Francin. He studied under Jacques-Louis David and Pierre-Henri de Valenciennes. In 1817, Michallon won the inaugural Prix de Rome for landscape painting. He travelled to Italy in 1818 and remained there for over two years. This trip had a profound influence on his work. Before he had much time to develop what he had learned however, he died at the age of 25 of pneumonia, a tragedy which cut short the life of a talented and well respected artist who could have gone on to win lasting fame. Though it is often disputed, it is thought that at one time, Corot was his pupil.

== Selective list of works ==
- The Oak and the Reed (1816), Fitzwilliam Museum, based on the version of Aesop's fable by Jean de la Fontaine
- Study of a Tree, (c. 1816), National Gallery, - National Gallery, London
- Démocrite et les Abdéritains (1817), École des beaux-arts of Paris (Prix de Rome)
- Paysage de Frascati (1817), musée du Louvre
- La Mort de Roland à Roncevaux (1819), musée du Louvre
- Homme drapé en rouge : habitant de Frascatti (?), musée du Louvre
- La Femme foudroyée, musée du Louvre
- The Forum at Pompeii, 1819, National Gallery of Art, Washington DC

== Bibliography ==
- Raymond Escholier La peinture française du XIXe siècle, de David à Géricaut, Librairie Floury, 1941.
- Pierre Caillau-Lamicq, « Achille-Etna Michallon », in Pierre Miquel, Le paysage français au XIX° siècle, Mantes-la-Jolie, 1975, T. II, p. 75-85.
- Achille-Etna Michallon, Catalogue de l'exposition, Paris, musée du Louvre, 1994.
- Blandine Lesage, « Achille-Etna Michallon (1796-1822). Catalogue de l'œuvre peint », in Gazette des Beaux-Arts, October 1997, T. CXXX.
